= Sex (The 1975 song) =

Single by the 1975

from the EP Sex and the album The 1975
- Released: 23 August 2013
- Studio: Rose Cottage (Wilmslow, Cheshire, England)
- Genre: Indie rock; indie pop; emo
- Length: 3:26
- Label: Dirty Hit; Polydor; Vagrant
- Songwriters: Matthew Healy; George Daniel; Adam Hann; Ross MacDonald
- Producers: Matthew Healy; George Daniel; Adam Hann; Ross MacDonald; Mike Crossey

The 1975 singles chronology
"Chocolate" (2013)	"Sex" (2013)	"Girls" (2013)

Music video
- "Sex" on YouTube

"Sex" is a song by English band The 1975 from their second extended play (EP) of the same name (2012) and eponymous debut studio album (2013). The song was written by band members George Daniel, Matty Healy, Adam Hann and Ross MacDonald. The band co-produced the EP version of the song with Michael and Robert Coles, while Mike Crossey provided additional production. The album version, produced by Crossey and the band, was released as the third single on 23 August 2013 by Dirty Hit, Polydor Records and Vagrant Records. Written at the age of 19, Healy said the song represents a love letter to prudish teenage girls.

An indie rock, indie pop and emo song, "Sex" contains elements of Britpop, power pop and pop-punk. Centred around spontaneous sexual intercourse and relationship allegiances, the song's lyrics discuss teenage angst, lust and infidelity. Upon release, the song received generally positive reviews from contemporary music critics, who praised its instrumentation, hooks and nostalgic lyrics, with some deeming it a highlight from Sex and The 1975. The song peaked at number 34 on the UK Singles Chart and number 35 on the US Billboard Alternative Airplay chart, and later was certified gold in both countries. Three music videos were released to accompany the song, including one set to an acoustic rendition of the track and a black and white version. The main version, directed by Adam Powell, was released on 26 July 2013. The visual depicts teenagers having sex, partying and taking drugs.

== Background and development ==
In January 2012, The 1975 was formed by singer Matty Healy, drummer George Daniel, guitarist Adam Hann and bassist Ross MacDonald, who had played music together since 2002. After being rejected by a number of major record labels, artist manager Jamie Osborne discovered the band and signed them to his label Dirty Hit. The 1975 were introduced to producer Mike Crossey, who aided them in the development of their debut album. Following the record's completion, the band chose to develop four extended plays (EP) based on the album tracks "The City", "Sex" and "Chocolate": Facedown (2012), Sex (2012), Music for Cars (2013) and IV (2013). The 1975 were recognised as a breakthrough act in 2013, having achieved commercial success with the sleeper hit "Chocolate", which became a radio staple. In May 2013, the band announced their eponymous debut album would be released on 9 September; it was ultimately released on 2 September 2013 and includes "Sex".

Written when Healy was 19, "Sex" is a song about dallying with an indecisive yet flirtatious woman who is unable to make up her mind; in a performance hosted by Last.fm, Healy described the track as a love letter to "every prudish 17-year old girl". He also rejected the idea that the song is "brash", instead arguing that "Sex" is "[the singer] at [his] most romantic", and that it reflects the personality of his youth. The song initially appeared on the 1975's EP of the same name; its production was handled by the band alongside Michael and Robert Coles, while Crossey provided additional production and was responsible for mixing the track. An updated version of "Sex", produced by Crossey and the band, was later released as the lead single from The 1975 on 23 August 2013.

== Music and lyrics ==
"Sex"
A 20-second sample featuring the album version of "Sex", showcasing its stadium-rock guitars, coarse guitar lines and pounding drums.

Musically, "Sex" is an indie rock, indie pop and emo song. The song has a length of three minutes and twenty-six seconds (3:26) and was written by The 1975 members George Daniel, Healy, Adam Hann and Ross MacDonald. The track's production incorporates minimal synths, stadium-rock guitars, coarse guitar lines and "shimmery" riffs, pounding drums, strained chords and a post-rock-influenced middle eight. "Sex" also draws influence from power pop, Britpop and pop-punk music. While the re-recorded album version of the song features additional synths and layers, it largely retains the composition of the original EP version. Healy's vocal delivery in the track was described as near-spoken word by Alexander De Petro of Music Feeds.

The lyrics to "Sex" explore themes related to teenage angst, lust, sex, and infidelity. Many of the track's lyrics describe literal scenes, such as the line: "My shirt looks so good, when it's just hanging off your back." Elsewhere, Healy discusses relationship allegiances, pondering the merits of receiving fellatio from a woman who already has a romantic partner with the lyrics: "And I'm not trying to stop you, love, but if we're going to do anything, we might as well just fuck." In the track's hook, Healy repeatedly exclaims: "She's got a boyfriend anyway."

== Reception ==
Amanda Koellner of Consequence wrote that "Sex" is the "attention-grabbing centerpiece" of the EP Sex. Reviewing the original version of the song, Brightest Young Things writer Bryce Rudow complimented Healy's vocals for their melodic quality while also praising the track's "catchy" production. Nothing but Hope and Passion's Norman Fleischer asserted "Sex" represents the EP's "obvious" standout and called it an "instant adolescent anthem". In her review of the EP Sex, Shaina Pearlman of Paste said the song is instrumental in demonstrating The 1975's strengths; she was favourable toward the track's hooks and pop-influenced production, deeming it "the kind of song that makes people—and perhaps major labels—take notice". Reviewing the EP for Hit the Floor Magazine, Amy Jones declared "Sex" the set's standout song, commending the prominence of Healy's vocals and the track's subdued production, which she said allows the band to showcase their "incredible instrumental work". In a ranking of The 1975's ten best songs, NME listed the original version of "Sex" at number three; the list's curator, Tom Connick, lauded its "rough-edged brilliance", Americanised pop-punk production elements and the hook's nostalgic teenage sentiment, commenting it is "punky, youthful and laced in a cheeky charm".

Andy Gill of The Independent and Digital Spy writer Lewis Corner declared "Sex" a highlight from The 1975, with the former describing it as an "infectious pop thrill". Pitchfork's Jayson Greene opined that the song is "a perfect Jimmy Eat World mall-emo anthem" and deemed it the band's best track. Vulture included "Sex" in the publication's unranked list of the 10 Essential 1975 Songs; Larry Fitzmaurice compared it to Jimmy Eat World and LCD Soundsystem's "All My Friends" (2007) while writing that retrospectively, the song acts as a "a practical blueprint for the type of passionate, immediately catchy melodies" which Healy would later employ in the band's future releases. Caryn Ganz of Rolling Stone compared the track to the work of the Killers—specifically their song "Somebody Told Me" (2004)—and "All My Friends", calling it a "would-be smash".

The Line of Best Fit's Laurence Day commented that "Sex" is evocative of the Killers' sound and complimented the updated production, which he deemed "fresher" than the original. In contrast, the editorial staff of idobi were ambivalent toward the updated album version of the song, opining that Healy's vocals sounded too Americanised and unrecognisable from the original version. Ray Rahman of Entertainment Weekly and Paste writer Hilary Saunders called the track "radio-friendly". Writing for Gigwise, Chloe Ravat commended Healy's vocals and the production of "Sex", writing: "It deserves a massive stadium to really do it justice." AllMusic writer Matt Collar said the song "drive[s] and climb[s] like the best anthemic '80s stadium rock" and commended its distillation of various influences into a single distinct sound, which he credits to delivering a "timeless" track. DIY's Emma Swan praised the couplet, "she's got a girlfriend anyway", deeming it both the most memorable point on the album and the track's only decipherable line.

In The 1975's native United Kingdom, "Sex" peaked at number 34 on the UK Singles Chart and number 23 on the UK Indie Chart, and was later certified gold by the British Phonographic Industry (BPI), denoting combined sales and streams of over 400,000 certified units in the UK. Elsewhere in Europe, the song reached number 68 on the Belgian Ultratip Flanders chart. In the United States, the track peaked at number 35 on the Billboard Alternative Airplay chart, and was later certified gold by the Recording Industry Association of America (RIAA), denoting combined sales and streams of over 500,000 certified units in the US.

== Music video ==
Prior to their formation as The 1975, the band recorded a music video featuring an acoustic rendition of "Sex" in late 2009. The visual was released under The 1975's former moniker Drive Like I Do. A black and white music video, directed by James Booth, was released on 5 October 2012. A video, directed by Adam Powell and set to the album version of the song, was released on 26 July 2013. Eschewing their signature black and white aesthetic, Healy called the shift toward colour "a massive step for [the band]". The singer also praised the "passion" and "understanding" of Powell, whom he described as a "true collaborative spirit" that led them to film the visual in Los Angeles. Regarding the overall development of the music video, Healy said: "As a video, 'Sex' feels very uncompromised, unpredictable and from a artistic viewpoint, very honest. That is always our main goal as a band. We are very proud of it."

The music video for the album version of "Sex" contains themes of love, crime, performance and sex. The visual centres around a pair of teenage lovers partying and taking drugs. Featuring sex scenes, smoking out of bongs, acid tripping and skinny dipping, the video was deemed NSFW by Sarah Bella of Music Feeds and the editorial staff of Variance. Idolator writer Mike Wass called the visual "eye-popping" and compared it to the music videos of Robin Thicke, deeming it "music video simply". Described as "naughty stuff" by Gigwise's Michaels Baggs, Fleischer said the video serves as "visual proof of how far the band has come". The reaction from The 1975's fanbase was mixed, with some expressing their disappointment in the band's decision to film the video in colour. Regarding the fan reaction, Healy said: "I think what that is, is kids reinstating how cool they are and showing people that they saw us first. I get that. That's totally cool."

== Charts ==
Chart performance for "Sex"
Chart (2013)	Peak position
Belgium (Ultratip Bubbling Under Flanders)	68
UK Indie (Official Charts)	23
UK Singles (Official Charts)	34
US Alternative Airplay (Billboard)	35

== Certifications ==
Certifications and sales for "Sex"
Region	Certification	Certified units/sales
United Kingdom (BPI)	Platinum	600,000^{‡}
United States (RIAA)	Gold	500,000^{‡}
^{‡} Sales+streaming figures based on certification alone.

== Credits and personnel ==
Credits adapted from Sex and The 1975 album liner notes. Recorded at Rose Cottage in Wilmslow, Cheshire, England

- Matthew Healy – composer, guitar, piano, vocals, producer
- George Daniel – composer, programming, drums, synthesizer, producer
- Adam Hann – composer, guitar, producer
- Ross MacDonald – composer, bass guitar, producer
- Michael Coles – producer (EP version)
- Robert Coles – producer (EP version)
- Mike Crossey – producer, additional producer (EP version), mixer
- Robin Schmidt – mastering engineer

== See also ==
- The 1975 discography
- List of songs by Matty Healy
