= Milk (The 1975 song) =

2017 single by The 1975

Song by the 1975

from the EP Sex
- A-side: "No Grey"
- Released: 6 October 2017
- Genre: Pop rock
- Length: 2:13
- Label: Dirty Hit; Polydor
- Songwriters: Matthew Healy; George Daniel; Adam Hann; Ross MacDonald
- Producers: Matthew Healy; George Daniel; Adam Hann; Michael Coles; Robert Coles

"Milk" is a song by English band the 1975, originally included as a hidden track on the band's second extended play (EP), Sex (2012). The song was written by Matty Healy, George Daniel, Adam Hann and Ross MacDonald. The 1975 produced it alongside Michael and Robert Coles. In 2013, the song served as the B-side on a limited edition 7-inch vinyl single for the Neighbourhood's "No Grey". A remastered version of the song was released as a standalone track on 6 October 2017.

A pop rock song, "Milk" contains elements of electro and shoegaze. The song is characterised by its extensive use of guitars, while the lyrics deal with themes of drugs. Upon release, the song received generally positive reviews from contemporary music critics, who praised its inclusion as a hidden track. The song has since become a fan-favourite among the 1975's fanbase. To promote the song, the band performed it live at London's Garage during a February 2019 charity show in support of War Child.

== Background and composition ==
"Milk"
A 13-second sample of "Milk", an electro and shoegaze-influenced pop rock song, showcasing its chorus.

In 2012, the 1975 began a process of releasing three extended plays (EP) leading to their eponymous debut album (2013). The band's second EP Sex was released on 19 November 2012 and includes "Milk" as a hidden track. The song was later included on the deluxe version of The 1975. Coinciding with their first headlining tour in 2013, American band the Neighbourhood released three limited-edition 7-inch vinyl singles, with the B-sides containing songs from their supporting acts. For the shows featuring the 1975, "No Grey" was released as the A-side while "Milk" was selected as the B-side. The pressing was extremely limited and sold only at the aforementioned shows, prompting fans of the 1975 to request a re-press. Although Healy did not know "that [the vinyl single] was so requested", he was against releasing more since the limited pressing makes the original copies "more special and valuable". Without a proper announcement, the 1975 uploaded a remastered standalone version of "Milk" to music streaming services on 6 October 2017.

Musically, "Milk" is a guitar-heavy pop rock song that contains elements of electro and shoegaze, and has a length of two minutes and thirteen seconds. The composition was heavily inspired by electronic group M83, borrowing many elements from the 2008 single Graveyard Girl. It represents the last two minutes and twelve seconds of "You", the final track on Sex. The song was written by George Daniel, Matty Healy, Adam Hann and Ross MacDonald, while the band handled the production alongside Michael and Robert Coles. Lyrically, the track incorporates themes of drugs and sex.

== Critical reception and promotion ==
Upon release, "Milk" was met with generally positive reviews from contemporary music critics and has since gained the status of a fan-favourite among the 1975's fanbase. In NME's list of the band's best songs, "Milk" was ranked at number nine; Tom Connick called the song one of the 1975's best "early bangers" and said the track's "well-trodden" topics are "handled with a front-and-centre pop sensibility". The editorial staff of the Alternative Press praised the inclusion of "Milk" as a hidden track at the end of "You", describing it as "hidden... like a sweet dessert". Writing for Consequence, Amanda Koellner said the song "tone[s] things down a bit while holding onto the guitar-heavy, more traditional sound that the latter half of [Sex] offers". Amy Jones of Hit the Floor Magazine wrote that despite the track's short length, it "has a lot packed into it". Paste's Shaina Pearlman deemed "Milk" a brief and "danceable" track that "concludes the EP's upward trajectory". Bre Offenberger, writing for The Post, asserted the song "is basically a jam about cocaine" and listed it at number 19 in a ranking of the band's catalogue. In February 2019, the 1975 performed "Milk" at London's Garage in the middle of a charity show for War Child and BRITs Week. In his coverage of the performance, Connick noted the song was "stripped free of the musical excess and wordy nature that present-day 1975 thrive on", going on to say the audience's reaction "cut to the heart of what makes [t]he 1975 so special".

== Credits and personnel ==
Credits adapted from Tidal.

- Matthew Healy – composer, guitar, piano, vocals, producer
- George Daniel – composer, programming, drums, synthesizer, producer
- Adam Hann – composer, guitar, producer
- Ross MacDonald – composer, bass guitar, producer
- Michael Coles – producer
- Robert Coles – producer
- Mike Crossey – mixer
- Robin Schmidt – mastering engineer

== See also ==
- The 1975 discography
- List of songs by Matty Healy
