= IV (The 1975 EP) =

EP by The 1975
- Released: 20 May 2013
- Genres: Electronica; indie rock
- Length: 16:49
- Labels: United Kingdom: Dirty Hit; Polydor; United States: Vagrant; Interscope
- Producers: George Daniel; Matthew Healy; Mike Crossey

The 1975 chronology
Music for Cars (2013)	IV (2013)	The 1975 (2013)

Singles from IV
- 1. "The City" Released: 9 August 2012; 2. "Fallingforyou" Released: 2013

IV is the fourth extended play by English band The 1975, released on 20 May 2013 through Dirty Hit and Polydor. It is the last of four EPs released before the band's debut album, The 1975. The song "The City" was re-recorded for this EP (listed as "single version"), and it is a longer version of the re-recorded version that appears on the debut album.

Interscope Records issued the EP in the United States by replacing every song but "The City" with songs from the band's previous singles. Interscope did issue "fallingforyou" backed with "Haunt //Bed" as a promotional 7" vinyl record as well.

== Critical reception ==
IV received near-positive reception. Sam Lawrie from Motion and Sound Magazine wrote: "The other-worldly sound is fascinating, and the appeal of The 1975 is obvious when they stand out so much in the alt-rock genre. On the other hand, it can also fail to make an impact, and that is a risk The 1975 have decided to take. Basically, you’ll either love it or you’ll hate it, but no doubt it’ll be another success in the fans’ eyes."

Musical Ramble rated the record 3.5/5, saying "I came into IV feeling skeptical that the seemingly schizophrenic personality of the band would eventually be their downfall, but came out pleasantly optimistic about what the album might be like. The EP isn’t without its flaws and I still think the inclusion of 'The City' was a bad call considering it will be the last release before the album."

== Track listing ==
No.	Title	Length
1.	"The City"	3:44
2.	"Haunt // Bed"	5:05
3.	"So Far (It's Alright)"	4:00
4.	"Fallingforyou"	4:00

American edition
No.	Title	Length
1.	"The City"	3:44
2.	"Sex"	3:26
3.	"Chocolate"	3:47
4.	"Me"	4:35
5.	"You" ("You" lasts for 4:51; hidden track "Milk” starts at 6:58 after a period of silence)	10:00

== Charts ==
Chart (2013)	Peak position
US Billboard 200	164
US Top Rock Albums	42
US Top Heatseekers	2

== See also ==
- The 1975 discography
- List of songs by Matty Healy
