= Girls (The 1975 song) =

Single by the 1975

from the album The 1975
- Released: 11 November 2013
- Genre: Pop rock; funk; pop
- Length: 4:15
- Label: Dirty Hit
- Songwriters: Matthew Healy; George Daniel; Adam Hann; Ross MacDonald
- Producers: Matthew Healy; George Daniel; Adam Hann; Ross MacDonald; Mike Crossey

The 1975 singles chronology
"Sex" (2013)	"Girls" (2013)	"Settle Down" (2014)

Music video
- "Girls" on YouTube

"Girls" is a song by English rock band The 1975, released as the fourth single from their self-titled debut album. A music video for "Girls" was released on 23 October 2013 and the song was released on 11 November.

== Music video ==
The official music video for "Girls" was released on 23 October 2013. It follows the video for "Sex", which changed the art style of the band's music videos that were originally monochrome. Rather than reverting to the black-and-white style, the band decided to continue making music videos in color. Speaking about the music video, lead singer and guitarist Matty Healy said:

When we released our last video ['Sex'], people really reacted to the fact that it was in colour. There was a lot of conjecture and talk surrounding it – due to the fact that it was an unexpected stylistic change. It was brought to our attention that certain people thought we were 'conforming to a record company's wishes' along with other expected and unexpected clichés. Obviously this couldn't be further from the truth, we are lucky enough to be surrounded by a group of individuals whose mantra centres on facilitating our creative wishes, we found the whole idea of us being told what to do fascinating. The story of the band who suffer at the hands of a record label shortly after a delirious rise is a tale as old as time. So we kinda wanted to make a tongue-in-cheek video about it. Twinned with our love of '80s pop, its innocence, grandiosity and conceptual ideas in music videos – we wanted to make a video about a record label's attempt at enforced conformity. We got our mate Adam down to a studio in Los Angeles at the start of our USA tour, got four models and made a video about us not wanting to make a video.

== Other versions ==
In 2017, musician Cameron Hurley, under the alias new.wav, released a cover version of "Girls" in style of Blink-182. This iteration attracted press from NME and Alternative Press, among others, and was shared on Twitter by both Healy and Blink's Mark Hoppus; Healy wrote, "I'm in love."

== Track listing ==
UK promotional single
No.	Title	Length
1.	"Girls" (Radio edit)	3:37
2.	"Girls" (Instrumental)	3:37
3.	"Girls" (Album version)	4:15
Total length:		8:43

== Personnel ==
Adapted from liner notes.

- Matthew Healy – vocals, guitar, songwriter, producer
- Adam Hann – guitar, songwriter, producer
- George Daniel – drums, songwriter, producer
- Ross MacDonald – bass guitar, songwriter, producer

Additional personnel

- Mike Crossey – producer
- Mike Spink – engineer
- Robin Schmidt – mastering

== Charts ==
=== Weekly charts ===
Chart (2013–14)	Peak position
Belgium (Ultratip Bubbling Under Flanders)	13
Czech Republic Singles Digital (ČNS IFPI)	62
Denmark (Tracklisten)	3
Scottish Singles Sales (Official Charts)	42
Slovakia Singles Digital (ČNS IFPI)	67
UK Singles (Official Charts)	45
US Bubbling Under Hot 100 (Billboard)	19
US Hot Rock & Alternative Songs (Billboard)	12
US Pop Airplay (Billboard)	28

=== Year-end charts ===
Chart (2014)	Position
US Hot Rock Songs (Billboard)	66

== Certifications ==
Region	Certification	Certified units/sales
United Kingdom (BPI)	Platinum	600,000^{‡}
United States (RIAA)	Platinum	1,000,000^{‡}
^{‡} Sales+streaming figures based on certification alone.

== Release history ==
Region	Date	Format	Label
United Kingdom	11 November 2013	Contemporary hit radio	Dirty Hit
Italy	7 March 2014	Contemporary hit radio	Universal
United States	15 July 2014	Contemporary hit radio	Vargant; Interscope

== See also ==
- The 1975 discography
- List of songs by Matty Healy
