= Sex EP =

Sex

EP by the 1975
- Released: 19 November 2012
- Genres: Rock; R&B; electro; pop; emo
- Length: 20:30
- Labels: Dirty Hit; Polydor
- Producers: The 1975; Michael Coles; Robert Coles; Mike Crossey

The 1975 chronology
Facedown (2012)	Sex (2012)	Music for Cars (2013)

Sex is the second extended play (EP) by English band The 1975. It was released on 19 November 2012 by Dirty Hit. A modified version was released in the US on 1 January 2013 by Dirty Hit and Polydor Records. The band produced the EP alongside Michael Coles, Robert Coles and Mike Crossey. They drew musical inspiration from Sigur Rós, Brian Eno and filmmaker John Hughes while thematically focusing on the passage of time. Prior to the record's debut, a music video for "Sex" was released.

An ambient rock-influenced rock, R&B, electro, pop and emo record, Sex is musically divided into two halves. Its first half is characterised by its ethereal compositions which draw from electropop, while the second half is informed by an extensive use of guitars. The record's lyrics incorporate themes of love, sex and drugs. Upon release, the EP received generally mixed reviews from contemporary music critics, who praised the exploration of various genres but felt the record suffered from a lack of cohesion.

== Development and release ==
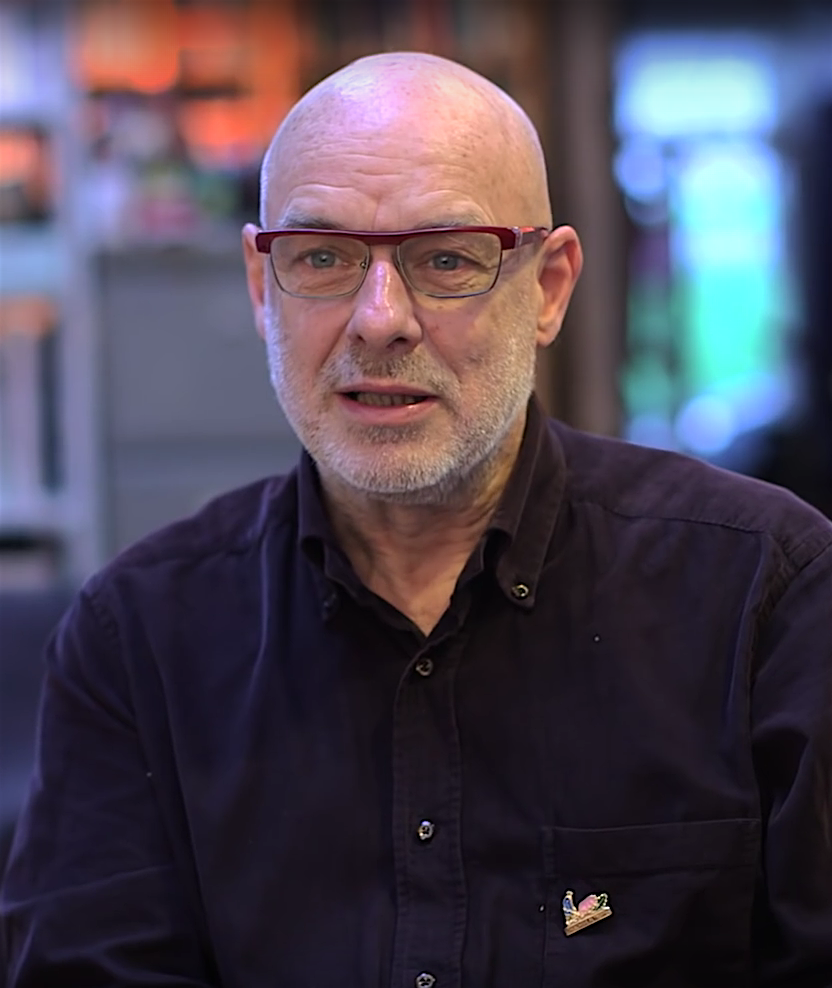
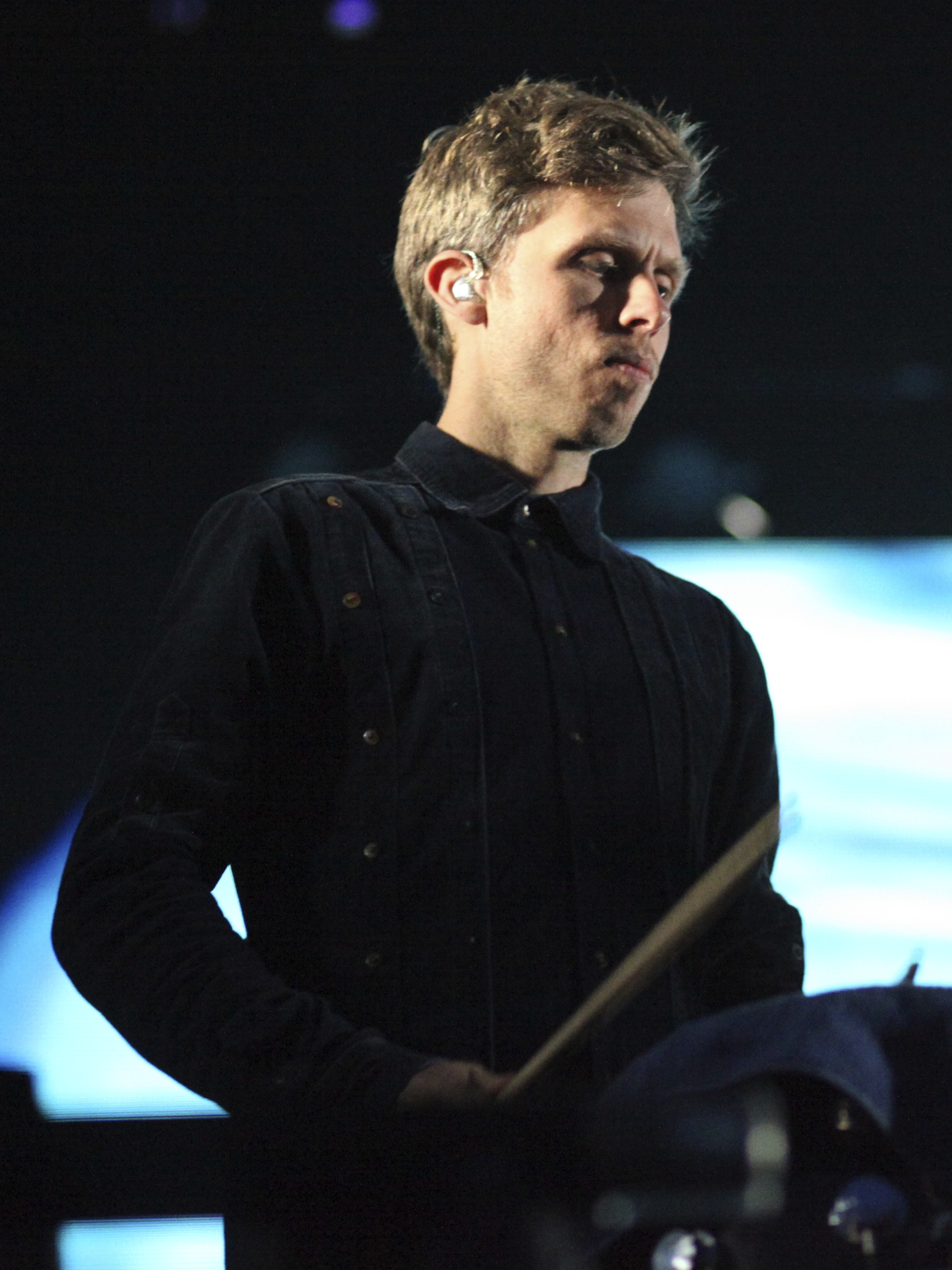
The 1975's lead singer Matty Healy cited the music of Brian Eno (left) and Sigur Rós (right) as influences on Sex

In January 2012, The 1975 was formed by lead singer Matty Healy, drummer George Daniel, guitarist Adam Hann and bassist Ross MacDonald, who had played music together since 2002. After being rejected by all major record labels, artist manager Jamie Osborne discovered the band and signed them to his label Dirty Hit. The 1975 began a process of releasing three extended plays (EP) leading to their debut album. In August of the same year, the band released their debut EP, Facedown, to critical success. To aid in developing the follow-up record, Sex, The 1975 approached Mike Crossey, who provided additional production and mixing on "Sex" and "You". In addition to working with producers Michael and Robert Coles, the band self-produced "Intro/Set3".

Regarding the creative process behind Sex, Healy said: "We were planning on putting out [the EPs] with absolutely no intention of them being accepted in the way they have. We kind of got used to being in really underground bands - where the world of mainstream radio and media just seems so genuinely far away." The 1975 drew inspiration from Sigur Rós, ambient musician Brian Eno and filmmaker John Hughes. The singer noted that his affection for ambient music stems from the genre's use in movies, which he enjoyed at a young age, saying it "commands you how to feel without the use of words". Discussing the overall theme of the EPs, Healy said they were focused on sex, love, drugs and fear, while also noting: "The songs on Sex are all about passing moments. Moments that we don't analyse at the time – only to understand them retrospectively." A music video for "Sex" was released on 5 October 2012, while the EP was released by Dirty Hit on 19 November 2012. A different version of Sex containing a modified tracklist was released in the US on 1 January 2013 by Dirty Hit and Polydor Records.

== Composition ==
=== Music and lyrics ===
Exploring ambient rock concepts, Sex combines rock, R&B, electro, pop and emo music, while the lyrics deal with themes of love, sex and drugs. Writing for Hit the Floor Magazine, Amy Jones said that in contrast to Facedown, Sex contains a "slightly darker [and] more foreboding" tone, while Paste writer Shaina Pearlman observed "equal parts ethereal and synth pop" throughout the record. Amanda Koellner of Consequence identified two distinct sounds within Sex. She described the first as recalling the "intricate electropop" of Passion Pit's "more mellow songs". Koellner wrote that "Sex" marks the EP's sonic shift from a "companionless headphone" record to the "centre of a party", characterised by "traditional" guitar-heavy compositions. DIY's Martyn Young shared this opinion and said the EP is "arbitrar[ily] split between the first two overtly electronic hazy pop songs and the second two "more straightforward traditional guitar tracks". QRO Magazine writer Robin Sinhababu noted that Sex is composed of four different styles of British emo.

=== Songs ===
"Undo"
Containing elements of chillwave, indie and acoustic, "Undo" is an electronic, R&B and pop slow jam composed in 1990s-style. Norman Fleischer of Nothing but Hope and Passion compared the song to the work of the Weeknd.

"Intro/Set3", an electronic, R&B and pop slow jam, opens Sex with "glitching" layers instruments and effects, electronic synth beats and tiered vocals which utilise a "cut up vocal effect". The song gradually builds until reaching a plateau in its mid-section. A "hazy" and "futuristic" 1990s-style electronic, R&B and pop slow jam, "Undo" contains electronic synths and elements of chillwave, indie and acoustic. "Sex" is an indie rock, indie pop and emo-rock song. Drawing from pop-punk, Britpop and power pop, the production features minimal synths and a post-rock-influenced middle eight. Lyrically, the song is about spontaneous sexual intercourse ("But if we're gonna do anything we might as well just fuck") while Healy repeats the hook: "She's got a boyfriend anyway".

Incorporating elements of shoegaze, "You" is a guitar-heavy ballad that begins with gentle and quiet distorted guitars as Healy sings: "You're a liar / At least all of your friends are". As the song continues to build, subtle drums are added at the 40-second mark while Healy sings the hook: "It takes a bit more than you". Thematically, Healy said the track was inspired by the dissolution of his social group, noting it represents "that moment when you realise, [']Oh, that was a bit of a waste of time--but fuck it, I'm actually just as happy as I was before so no harm done[']". "Milk" is a hidden track that occupies the final two minutes and twelve seconds of "You". It is a guitar-heavy pop rock and indie song containing elements of electro and shoegaze, while the lyrics deal with drugs and sex. "Head.Cars.Bending (George Daniel Remix)" is an electronic and dance song that incorporates elements of UK garage. The song's original version was later released on the 1975's third EP, Music for Cars (2013).

== Critical reception ==
Awarding Sex a score of 9 out of 10, Amy Jones commended the EP's musical diversity and its development of The 1975's signature sound, asserting the record shows promise for the band's debut album. In addition to praising the title track as a highlight from the EP, she wrote: "Every track on this is incredible and shows off the band's spectrum of talents with ease and simplicity." Pearlman lauded the diversity of genres on Sex, writing that while it did not appear entirely cohesive at first, repeated listens helped the EP "[come] together remarkably well". She was particularly favourable toward the second half of the record, writing that the 1975 excel on pop-oriented songs such as "Sex" and "You", the latter of which she deemed as "undoubtedly the standout". Norman Fleischer of Nothing but Hope and Passion praised the variety of styles present on the EP and deemed the title track an "obvious hit single", writing that the band "stick[s] up to the expectations" set by fellow Manchester musicians.

Martyn Young awarded Sex three out of five stars; asserting that while the record showed "a great deal of promise"—with the exception of "You", which he opined ends the EP on a disappointing note—he struggled to understand "exactly who [T]he 1975 are", owing to the band's "wildly fluctuating" sound. Amanda Koellner gave Sex a grade of C−. She commended the 1975's exploration of different styles and called the EP a "fun listen with lots to offer". However, she felt it was "apparent that The 1975 are still searching for their sound" and criticised the transition from the first half of the record to the second, comparing it to "an accidental click of the shuffle button". In a negative review, Robin Sinhababu gave the EP a score of 3.5 out of 10. Despite praising the "dynamic" sound of "You", she called Healy a nuisance and criticised the record's overtly sexual nature, saying the singer "whines melodramatically about all kinds of things, from the irrelevant to the trivial".

== Track listing ==
All tracks are written by George Daniel, Matthew Healy, Adam Hann and Ross MacDonald.

Sex – Standard version
No.	Title	Producer(s)	Length
1.	"Intro/Set3"	The 1975	3:08
2.	"Undo"	The 1975; Michael Coles; Robert Coles	4:04
3.	"Sex"	The 1975; M. Coles; R. Coles; Mike Crossey^{[a]}	3:26
4.	"You" ("You" lasts for 4:51; hidden track "Milk", which lasts for 2:12, starts at 23:58)	The 1975; M. Coles; R. Coles; Crossey^{[a]}	26:10
Total length:			36:48

Later digital editions of Sex replace the 19 minutes of silence with just under 3 minutes; this version is 9:52 in length and "Milk" begins at 7:36.

Sex – US version
No.	Title	Producer(s)	Length
1.	"Sex"	Crossey; The 1975	3:27
2.	"Sex (Acoustic Version)"	The 1975	4:06
3.	"Chocolate (Acoustic Version)"	The 1975	3:58
4.	"Head.Cars.Bending (George Daniel Remix)" (with George Daniel)	The 1975	4:12
5.	"Is There Somebody Who Can Watch You (Dream Koala Remix)" (with Dream Koala)	The 1975	3:54
Total length:			19:37

Notes

- ^{^{[a]}} signifies an additional producer
- On the standard version, "Sex" is alternatively titled "Sex - EP Version"
- "Head.Cars.Bending (George Daniel Remix)" is alternatively titled "Head.Cars.Bending (The 1975 Remix)"

== See also ==
- The 1975 discography
- List of songs by Matty Healy
