= Settle Down (The 1975 song) =

Single by the 1975

from the album The 1975
- Released: 24 February 2014
- Recorded: 2012–13
- Genre: Indie rock; funk; pop
- Length: 3:59
- Label: Dirty Hit
- Songwriters: Matthew Healy; George Daniel; Adam Hann; Ross MacDonald
- Producers: Matthew Healy; George Daniel; Adam Hann; Ross MacDonald; Mike Crossey

The 1975 singles chronology
"Girls" (2013)	"Settle Down" (2014)	"Robbers" (2014)

Music video
- "Settle Down" on YouTube

"Settle Down" is a song by English rock band The 1975, released from their self-titled debut as the fifth single on 24 February 2014. "Settle Down" was added to the playlist of British national radio station BBC Radio 1 on 20 January 2014.

== Track listing ==
All tracks are written by Matthew Healy, George Daniel, Adam Hann, Ross MacDonald.

UK promotional single
No.	Title	Length
1.	"Settle Down"	3:59
2.	"Settle Down" (Instrumental)	3:59
Total length:		7:58

== Personnel ==
Adapted from liner notes.

- Matthew Healy – vocals, guitar, songwriter, producer
- Adam Hann – guitar, songwriter, producer
- George Daniel – drums, songwriter, producer
- Ross MacDonald – bass guitar, songwriter, producer

Additional personnel

- Mike Crossey – mixing, production
- Mike Spink – engineering
- Jonathan Gilmore – Pro-Tools engineering, additional programming
- Robin Schmidt – mastering

== Charts ==
Chart (2014)	Peak position
UK Singles (Official Charts)	68

== Certifications ==
Region	Certification	Certified units/sales
United Kingdom (BPI)	Silver	200,000^{‡}
^{‡} Sales+streaming figures based on certification alone.

== Release history ==
Region	Date	Format	Label
United Kingdom	24 February 2014	Contemporary hit radio	Dirty Hit

== See also ==
- The 1975 discography
- List of songs by Matty Healy
