= The 1975 (album) =

Studio album by The 1975
- Released: 2 September 2013
- Recorded: June – September 2012, March 2013
- Studio: Motor Museum (Liverpool)
- Genres: Electropop; pop rock; indie pop; pop
- Length: 50:41
- Labels: Dirty Hit; Polydor; Vagrant; Interscope
- Producers: Matthew Healy; George Daniel; Mike Crossey; The 1975

The 1975 chronology
IV (2013)	The 1975 (2013)	I Like It When You Sleep, for You Are So Beautiful yet So Unaware of It (2016)

Singles from The 1975
- 1. "The City" Released: 9 August 2012; 2. "Chocolate" Released: 4 March 2013; 3. "Sex" Released: 23 August 2013; 4. "Girls" Released: 11 November 2013; 5. "Settle Down" Released: 24 February 2014; 6. "Robbers" Released: 26 May 2014; 7. "Heart Out" Released: 18 August 2014

The 1975 is the debut studio album by English band The 1975. It was released on 2 September 2013 through Dirty Hit and Polydor. It was produced by band members Matthew Healy and George Daniel together with Mike Crossey.

Between Autumn 2012 and Spring 2013, during which time the album was recorded, the band released four EPs. They toured to support and build momentum for the album, including numerous gigs and special appearances with other artists.

The album received positive reviews from critics, and topped the UK Albums Chart on 8 September. As of August 2023, it had sold 791,000 copies in the UK, and 1,000,000 copies in the US as of June 2018.

== Background ==
Between mid-2012 and early 2013, The 1975 released four extended plays: Facedown, Sex, Music for Cars and IV; some of the songs included there would make it onto the album.

The band toured extensively to support the album, raise awareness and build up momentum before dropping the full-length release. They toured London with Bastille and Muse in the second half of The 2nd Law World Tour at the Emirates Stadium on 26 May 2013, the United States with the Neighbourhood on June, and London again with the Rolling Stones at Hyde Park on 13 July. They later played at the Festival Republic Stage at the 2013 Reading and Leeds Festival in August.

== Musical style ==
Although primarily labelled as indie, the album features a wide variety of genres including electropop, indie pop, pop, and pop rock. It also includes emo, pop punk, funk and indie rock elements.

Frontman Matty Healy described the style as "pretty experimental, and goes from glitchy R&B to big 80s powerpop to mid 90s soul, but it's done in our way obviously."

== Recording ==
In 2012, in an interview with Elliot Mitchell of When the Gramophone Rings, Healy said that the band had a different approach to recording the album than to the EPs: "I think the best albums are ones where every track could be a potential single. Both our EP's center around a lead track whilst showcasing a wider body of work, whereas we feel the album is lead track after lead track, with all the alternative moments captured in an accessible way." He also said that the album had been "five years in the making, formed through the many different incarnations of the band," and added that it is "drenched in our identity and it's everything that we are. It does span a lot of genres and depth, but it's still a coherent piece of work and everything that makes our band our band, personally I would say it's an ambitious debut record."

On the content, Healy said:

"This recording process has been really fun, as we've had a lot of these songs for a while, and to record them in a completely different mindset with a completely different outlook has been really interesting. (...) The album isn't a haberdashery of past singles and old stuff, it has been focused down into a collective piece of work. There's tracks on there that people would have heard live, and older tracks that we've reworked. This album is a soundtrack to our formative years, so it would be dishonest to not put songs on there that we wrote when we were 21, as we want people to connect to it in the same way that we do."

== Promotion ==
=== Singles ===
The lead single from the album, a re-recorded version of the song "Sex", was scheduled to be released on 26 August 2013. The song premiered on Zane Lowe's BBC Radio 1 show on 8 July 2013 as his 'Hottest Record in the World'. A music video for the song was released onto YouTube on 26 July 2013.

On 27 August 2013, the song "Settle Down" premiered on Zane Lowe's BBC Radio 1 show as part of his 'Album of the Week' segment, and on 29 August 2013 "Girls" became Lowe's 'Hottest Record'.

== Critical reception ==
Professional ratings
Aggregate scores
Source	Rating
AnyDecentMusic?	6.1/10
Metacritic	67/100
Review scores
Source	Rating
AllMusic	4.5/5 stars
Alternative Press	3.5/5 stars
Clash	8/10
Entertainment Weekly	B
The Guardian	4/5 stars
The Independent	3/5 stars
Pitchfork	5.9/10
PopMatters	7/10
Q	3/5 stars
Rolling Stone	2/5 stars

The 1975 received favourable reviews from contemporary music critics. At Metacritic, which assigns a normalised rating out of 100 to reviews from mainstream critics, the album received an average score of 67, based on 17 reviews.

Ashley Clements of Gigwise called the album "Quite possibly the best indie LP of the year." Simon Butcher of Clash magazine rated the album 8/10 and wrote: "It's a great pop record with plenty of depth (a rare thing) that will prove divisive. Some will dismiss this band in one listen (or none) as the next Owl City, but with years of playing together already, plenty of fans, and lots of songs ready to go, The 1975 will be one overnight success that'll outlive the critics."

Dave Reynolds of Bearded magazine noticed similarities between the band's and Michael Jackson's story, and wrote that the "unmistakable '80s aesthetic" reflects a homage to Thriller. "A debut album with 16 tracks should never be able to capture and hold a listeners attention, but The 1975 make a damn good stab at it, with a record littered with pop hooks and imagination. MJ would be proud," he concluded.

Q defined The 1975 as "possibly the first band to take influence from The Thompson Twins, China Crisis and the long-lost Frazier Chorus." "That makes them sound gloriously out of kilter, but the truth is that their jittery genre-jumping is impossibly now," the magazine continued. "Best of all, for all their rarely lauded influence, this is a band who sound like nobody else right now. Hugely intriguing," concluded reviewer John Aizlewood, giving the album 3/5 stars rating.

== Commercial performance ==
The album topped the UK Albums Chart on 8 September, selling 31,538 copies in the first week. On 26 September 2014, it was certified platinum by the British Phonographic Industry (BPI) for sales of over 300,000 copies. As of December 2018, it has sold 584,808 copies in the UK.

In the United States, The 1975 debuted at No. 28 on the Billboard 200, with around 15,000 copies sold on its first week of release. It also debuted at No. 8 on Billboard's Rock Albums, and 7 on Alternative Albums. As of March 2016, the album has sold 349,000 copies in the US.

== Track listing ==
All tracks are written by George Daniel, Matthew Healy, Adam Hann and Ross MacDonald.

The 1975 track listing
No.	Title	Length
1.	"The 1975"	1:19
2.	"The City"	3:26
3.	"M.O.N.E.Y."	3:36
4.	"Chocolate"	3:47
5.	"Sex"	3:27
6.	"Talk!"	2:47
7.	"An Encounter"	1:14
8.	"Heart Out"	3:22
9.	"Settle Down"	3:59
10.	"Robbers"	4:14
11.	"Girls"	4:15
12.	"12"	1:19
13.	"She Way Out"	3:59
14.	"Menswear"	3:26
15.	"Pressure"	3:41
16.	"Is There Somebody Who Can Watch You"	2:54
Total length:		50:50

=== Deluxe edition ===
In addition to the standard edition of the album, a double CD deluxe edition was also released, with the second disc containing the band's four EPs: Facedown, Sex, Music for Cars and IV. The iTunes deluxe edition contains additional remixes, making a total of 39 tracks. For the Sex EP, the gap of silence between "You" and "Milk" is reduced from 19 minutes to nearly 3.

Deluxe edition – Facedown EP
No.	Title	Length
1.	"Facedown"	2:49
2.	"The City" (EP version)	3:41
3.	"Antichrist"	4:43
4.	"Woman"	3:02

Deluxe edition – Sex EP
No.	Title	Length
5.	"Intro/Set3"	3:07
6.	"Undo"	4:04
7.	"Sex" (EP version)	3:26
8.	"You" ("You" lasts for 4:51; hidden track "Milk", which lasts for 2:12, starts at 7:36)	9:52

Deluxe edition – Music for Cars EP
No.	Title	Length
9.	"Anobrain"	1:53
10.	"Chocolate"	3:43
11.	"HNSCC"	2:31
12.	"Head.Cars.Bending"	3:27
13.	"Me"	4:35

Deluxe edition – IV EP
No.	Title	Length
14.	"The City" (single version)	3:44
15.	"Haunt // Bed"	5:05
16.	"So Far (It's Alright)"	4:00
17.	"Fallingforyou"	4:00

iTunes deluxe edition – remixes
No.	Title	Length
18.	"Chocolate" (Jonas LR remix)	5:15
19.	"Pressure" (Artful remix)	4:36
20.	"Talk!" (Hackman remix)	4:53
21.	"M.O.N.E.Y." (Mike Skinner remix)	5:14
22.	"Settle Down" (Dan Lissvik remix)	6:25
23.	"She Way Out" (Cid Rim remix)	4:56

== Personnel ==
The 1975

- George Daniel – drums, programming, synthesizers, vocals, production (tracks 7, 12 and 16), photography
- Adam Hann – guitar
- Matthew Healy – vocals, guitar, piano, production (tracks 7, 12 and 16)
- Ross MacDonald – bass guitar

Additional musicians

- John Waugh – saxophone

Technical personnel

- The 1975 – production (all tracks except 7, 12 and 16)
- Mike Crossey – mixing, production (all tracks except 7, 12 and 16), additional programming
- Mike Spink – engineering
- Jonathan Gilmore – Pro-Tools engineering, additional programming
- Robin Schmidt – mastering
- Samüel Johnson – design
- David Drake – photography
- David Ma – photography

== Charts ==
=== Weekly charts ===
Weekly chart performance for The 1975
Chart (2013–2015)	Peak position
Australian Albums (ARIA)	29
Austrian Albums (Ö3 Austria)	60
Belgian Albums (Ultratop Flanders)	191
German Albums (Offizielle Top 100)	57
Irish Albums (IRMA)	4
Japanese Album Chart (Oricon)	37
New Zealand Albums (RMNZ)	5
Scottish Albums (Official Charts)	1
Swiss Albums (Schweizer Hitparade)	100
UK Albums (Official Charts)	1
US Billboard 200	28
US Top Alternative Albums (Billboard)	7
US Top Rock Albums (Billboard)	8

Chart (2023)	Peak position
Irish Albums (IRMA)	28
Scottish Albums (Official Charts)	4
UK Albums (Official Charts)	3

=== Year-end charts ===
Year-end chart performance for The 1975
Chart (2013)	Position
UK Albums (OCC)	64
Chart (2014)	Position
UK Albums (OCC)	33
US Billboard 200	141
US Top Rock Albums (Billboard)	25
US Alternative Albums (Billboard)	20
Chart (2015)	Position
US Top Rock Albums (Billboard)	70
Chart (2016)	Position
UK Albums (OCC)	74

== Certifications ==
Certifications for The 1975
Region	Certification	Certified units/sales
Australia (ARIA)	Gold	35,000^{‡}
Denmark (IFPI Danmark)	Gold	10,000^{‡}
New Zealand (RMNZ)	Platinum	15,000^{‡}
Singapore (RIAS)	Gold	5,000^{*}
United Kingdom (BPI)	3× Platinum	900,000^{‡}
United States (RIAA)	Platinum	1,000,000^{‡}
^{*} Sales figures based on certification alone.^{‡} Sales+streaming figures based on certification alone.

== Release history ==
Release history and formats for The 1975
Country	Date	Format	Label
United Kingdom	2 September 2013	CD; DL; LP	Dirty Hit; Polydor
United States	3 September 2013	CD; DL; LP	Vagrant

== See also ==
- The 1975 discography
- List of songs by Matty Healy
