= The City (song) =

Single by the 1975

from the EP Facedown and IV and the album The 1975
- Released: 9 August 2012
- Genre: Pop rock; industrial pop
- Length: 3:41 (2012 Facedown version); 3:44 (2013 IV version); 3:26 (2013 album edit)
- Label: Dirty Hit
- Songwriters: Matthew Healy; George Daniel; Adam Hann; Ross MacDonald
- Producers: Matthew Healy; George Daniel; Adam Hann; Ross MacDonald; Mike Crossey

The 1975 singles chronology
"The City" (2012)	"Chocolate" (2013)

"The City" is the debut single by English rock band The 1975, released in 2012. The song was originally recorded for their debut extended play Facedown, with a re-recorded version later appearing on their fourth extended play IV and (in edited form) as the second track on their self-titled debut. It was re-released as a single in 2013 in the form of a re-recorded version (edited for their debut album) which peaked at number 30 on the UK Singles Chart and number 27 on the Scottish Singles Chart. The song also featured in the game FIFA 14.

== Background ==
"The City" was originally released by the band in 2012 on their debut EP, Facedown. After the band released their breakthrough single, "Chocolate", they originally intended to follow up with releasing "Settle Down". During the band's interview with Zane Lowe on BBC Radio 1 in April 2013, singer Matty Healy revealed they had only been sent the new mix of the song weeks prior and so decided to re-release it as a single and on the new EP.

=== Music video ===
A second music video to accompany the re-release of "The City" was first released onto YouTube on 25 April 2013 at a total length of three minutes and thirty-seven seconds.

== Track listing ==
UK promotional single
No.	Title	Length
1.	"The City"	3:26
2.	"The City" (Instrumental)	3:26
Total length:		7:28

== Charts ==
Chart (2013)	Peak position
Belgium (Ultratip Bubbling Under Flanders)	87
Scotland Singles (OCC)	27
UK Singles (OCC)	30

== Certifications ==
Certifications and sales for "The City"
Region	Certification	Certified units/sales
United Kingdom (BPI)	Gold	400,000^{‡}
^{‡} Sales+streaming figures based on certification alone.

== Release history ==
Region	Date	Format	Label
United Kingdom	9 August 2012	Contemporary hit radio	Dirty Hit
United Kingdom	20 May 2013	Contemporary hit radio	Dirty Hit

== See also ==
- The 1975 discography
- List of songs by Matty Healy
