= Music for Cars =

EP by The 1975
- Released: 4 March 2013
- Studios: Rose Cottage, Cheshire
- Genres: Electronic; ambient; experimental
- Length: 16:11
- Labels: Dirty Hit; Polydor; Vagrant
- Producers: The 1975; Mike Crossey

The 1975 chronology
Sex (2012)	Music for Cars (2013)	IV (2013)

Singles from Music for Cars
- 1. "Chocolate" Released: 4 March 2013

Music for Cars is the third extended play (EP) by English band The 1975, released on 4 March 2013 by Dirty Hit, Polydor Records and Vagrant Records. Development of the record began after the band completed their eponymous debut album. Working with producer Mike Crossey, The 1975 created "Chocolate" during the album's recording sessions before building the other tracks of the EP around the song. The band sought to create a cohesive concept for the record, primarily producing the remaining four songs by themselves in the bedroom of singer Healy at Rose Cottage in Cheshire.

An electronic, ambient and experimental record, Music for Cars is composed of atmospheric songs containing a cinematic sound. The EP also incorporates elements of pop, rock, synth-pop, funk and R&B, among other genres. Upon release, the record received positive reviews from music critics, who praised the EP's exploration of electronic music and its balance of pop and atmospherics songs. Prior to the record's debut, The 1975 released "Head.Cars.Bending" and the single "Chocolate". The song was a sleeper hit, representing the band's commercial breakthrough when it became a radio staple in 2013.

== Background and development ==
In January 2012, The 1975 was formed by lead singer Matty Healy, drummer George Daniel, guitarist Adam Hann and bassist Ross MacDonald, who had played music together since 2002. After being rejected by all major record labels, artist manager Jamie Osborne discovered the band and signed them to his label Dirty Hit. The 1975 began a process of releasing three extended plays (EP) leading to their debut album. In August of 2012, the band released their debut EP, Facedown, to critical success. In November 2012, The 1975 released their second EP, Sex.

The 1975 developed a working relationship with producer Mike Crossey during the recording of Sex. Crossey was initially tentative in his approach; Healy told to magazine Some Kind of Awesome that the producer was empathetic toward the band, having understood their hesitancy toward producing music in a different manner. Crossey suggested they co-produce the music and worked with The 1975 during a week of pre-production in their studio. The band were inspired by soundtracks from 1980s films and sought to incorporate those elements into The 1975, with Crossey commenting they were "pretty unashamed about wanting a song like 'Chocolate' to be a smash hit". Healy credits the producer with vitalising the creative process and bringing an enhanced technical understanding to the recording of the album.

After completing their work on The 1975, the band "came straight out of the studio" and recorded Music for Cars back at Rose Cottage in Cheshire. Rather than working chronologically, the majority of the material on the EP's were created after finishing the 1975's debut album. For their third EP, the band chose to build the record around "Chocolate" in order to "take a part of the story and embellish it even further". Regarding this decision, the singer felt it was critical to create a foundation for listeners to understand their sound. The 1975 recorded the EP's "ambient leftfield-type music" by themselves in Healy's bedroom; Crossey viewed it as an important aspect of The 1975's identity, saying: "We really wanted to incorporate all these elements and strike a good balance." During the recording of Music for Cars, the band strove to deliver a cohesive concept, treating it as an EP rather than "an EP that has a single on it, a remix, and acoustic or a live version on it". Following its completion, Healy said: "I'm really proud of this record, I think we all are. I think it's one EP that's been written more as an EP than anything else."

== Composition ==
"Me"
The majority of Music for Cars is composed of atmospheric ambient pieces such as "Me", which incorporates a subtle 1980s-style saxophone solo.

Music for Cars consists of five songs, written by Daniel, Healy, Hann and MacDonald. The band handled the EP's production while co-producing "Chocolate" with Crossey. Musically, it is categorised as an electronic, ambient and experimental record. Lauri Hiltunen of PopMatters described Music for Cars as a mixture of "cinematic soundscapes and a more traditional band format"; with the exception of "Chocolate", the remaining four tracks "take a far more atmospheric, electronic, and often even ambient approach". The Rolling Stone editorial staff similarly commented that the EP "wrap[s] two pop anthems inside a trio of hazy, atmospheric journeys".

"Anobrain", an experimental-influenced ambient song with a cinematic tone and ethereal voices, opens Music for Cars. The second track, "Chocolate", is a pop, rock, funk and alt-rock song that incorporates sharp and bright guitar notes, rapid-fire vocal hooks and elements of stadium rock. The track's title serves as a euphemism for marijuana; the lyrics detail smoking the drug in his hometown with friends, resulting in an encounter with the police. Containing a cinematic tone, "HNSCC" is an ambient interlude. The song's expansive production contains chattering birds, ethereal voices, a reverb-heavy guitar, synth tones and elements of shoegaze. The title is an abbreviation of head and neck squamous-cell carcinoma, which caused the death of Healy's grandmother prior to the recording of Music for Cars. Speaking about the track, Healy said it was impacted by "the fact that something you have no control over can really mess with the dynamics of people's lives".

"Head.Cars.Bending"
A 20-second sample of "Head.Cars.Bending" showcasing its chorus, which features brostep bass drops, cloud rap beats and clattering syncopation.

The experimental-influenced "Head.Cars.Bending" is a mid-tempo electronic, pop and synth-pop song that contains elements of R&B and glitch music. The track is built upon a skittering instrumentation composed of synth claps, clattering syncopation, "angelic" vocal harmonies, pulsing rhythms, cloud rap beats and brostep bass drops. "Head.Cars.Bending" opens with distantly resonating percussive breaks and a "dreamy" synth, later adding ripples of guitar and surging bass to its melody, while the bridge utilises R&B vocals. The final song on Music for Cars, "Me", is an ambient and synth-pop ballad that features "wistful" and ethereal vocals and a subtle 1980s-style saxophone solo. The track's lyrics are written as a letter from a future-version of Healy; the singer confesses the guilt experienced from his suicidal ideations, while also addressing his role in the dissolution of his family, specifically the divorce of his parents.

== Release and reception ==
Music for Cars was officially released by Dirty Hit, Polydor Records and Vagrant Records on 4 March 2013. Hiltunen praised the more-overtly electronic sound of Music for Cars in comparison to The 1975's prior EPs. The writer commented that, while "Chocolate" was the record's "obvious main attraction", the remaining four songs are more exciting, saying "it feels like it’s here that [t]he 1975 finally show their cards and give the listener a reason to start paying attention to them". Rolling Stone deemed "Chocolate" and "Head.Cars.Bending" as highlights from Music for Cars, commending the EP's balance of pop "anthems" with atmospheric tracks. Lauding the record's balance of "artsy leanings" and "grandiose anthems" in his review for the Chicago Reader, Leor Galil said "it's especially impressive how they move between those two poles while consistently sounding like the same group". Galil also declared "Head.Cars.Bending" a standout from the EP, along with "HNSCC". Venture Mag's Helen Whittle awarded the record a score of 7 out of 10; she deemed "Chocolate" and "Head.Cars.Bending" the highlights from the set, which she commented is "possibly too experimental", while also saying: "The 1975 bring an honest, fresh sound to alternative pop and it's certain that their album will be highly anticipated."

=== Promotion ===
To promote Music for Cars, The 1975 released "Chocolate" as a single on 21 January 2013. A black and white music video, directed by Gareth Phillips, was released on 20 February. The song was a sleeper hit, becoming the band's commercial breakthrough and a radio staple in 2013. The track debuted at number 71 on the UK Singles Chart in February 2013, eventually peaking at 19 and spending 35 weeks inside the Top 100. "Chocolate" was later certified double platinum in the UK by the British Phonographic Industry (BPI), denoting over 1.2 million certified units in the UK. In the US, the song reached number 80 on the Billboard Hot 100 chart. The track was later certified gold by the Recording Industry Association of America (RIAA), denoting over 500,000 certified units in the US. Additionally, The 1975 premiered "Head.Cars.Bending" prior to the EP's release on 6 February 2013.

== Track listing ==
All tracks are written by George Daniel, Matthew Healy, Adam Hann and Ross MacDonald, and produced by The 1975, except where noted.

Music for Cars track listing
No.	Title	Length
1.	"Anobrain"	1:54
2.	"Chocolate" (producers: Mike Crossey, The 1975)	3:44
3.	"HNSCC" (writer: Matthew Healy)	2:31
4.	"Head.Cars.Bending"	3:28
5.	"Me"	4:34
Total length:		16:11

== Personnel ==
Credits adapted from Music for Cars EP liner notes.

The 1975

- George Daniel – programming, drums, synthesizer
- Matthew Healy – guitar, piano, vocals
- Adam Hann – guitar
- Ross MacDonald – bass guitar

Production

- The 1975 – production, mixing
- Mike Crossey – production (track 2)
- Robin Schmidt – mastering

== See also ==
- The 1975 discography
- List of songs by Matty Healy
