= Chocolate (The 1975 song) =

Single by The 1975

Single by The 1975

from the EP Music for Cars and the album The 1975
- Released: 4 March 2013
- Recorded: 2012–13
- Genre: Pop; rock; funk; alternative rock
- Length: 3:44
- Label: Dirty Hit; Vagrant; Interscope
- Songwriters: Matthew Healy; George Daniel; Adam Hann; Ross MacDonald
- Producers: Matthew Healy; George Daniel; Adam Hann; Ross MacDonald; Mike Crossey

The 1975 singles chronology
"The City" (2012)	"Chocolate" (2013)	"Sex" (2013)

Music video
- "Chocolate" on YouTube

"Chocolate" is a song by English rock band The 1975. The song was originally recorded by the band for their third extended play, Music for Cars, where it appears as the second track, and later appeared as the fourth track on their self-titled debut.

== Background ==
In January 2012, The 1975 was formed by singer Matthew Healy, drummer George Daniel, guitarist Adam Hann and bassist Ross MacDonald, who had played music together since 2002. After being rejected by all major record labels, artist manager Jamie Oborne discovered the band and signed them to his label Dirty Hit. The 1975 began a process of releasing three extended plays (EP) leading to their debut album. In August 2012, the band released their debut EP, Facedown, to critical success. In November 2012, The 1975 released their second EP, Sex. After being introduced to Mike Crossey during the recording of Sex, The 1975 worked with the producer during the development of "Chocolate".

== Development and release ==
=== Writing ===
The 1975 and Crossey spent a week in the band's studio engaging in pre-production for The 1975 (2013); they spent time listening to records together and discussed the desired aesthetics of the album. Crossey said it was critical to develop a sonic palette with a distinct character and "fingerprint" which could be "immediately" attributable to The 1975. The band also sought to incorporate contrasting sounds, one of which was "an impressive pop element" similar to the soundtracks from 1980s films and the work of Michael Jackson. Healy described the lyrics of "Chocolate" as a love letter to boredom, limited opportunities for self-expression, understanding where one is from and embracing the makeup of that place. Focusing on The 1975's relationships with drugs and the governing authorities in his small town, Healy developed a story which details smoking marijuana with friends, resulting in encounters with the police. The song's title, "Chocolate", is used throughout the song as a euphemism for the drug.

=== Recording and release ===
For "Chocolate", Crossey revealed the band was "pretty unashamed" about wanting the song to become a commercial success. Following the initial ideation stage, The 1975 and Crossey recorded the song at Motor Museum studios in Liverpool. Alongside "Robbers" and "Sex", the track was one of the first three written for The 1975. After recording "Chocolate" in Liverpool, the band and Crossey traveled to London with engineer Mike Spink and programmer Jonathan Gilmore, where they worked at Livingston studio. The producers focused on achieving their desired sounds at the source rather than during mixing; they incorporated unorthodox recording techniques such as making the guitars sound like "a cloud of tone" by positioning the microphones at different heights and substituting the outboard for guitar pedals.

Programming "Chocolate" involved the use of "strange" percussion such as off-beat "trashy parts" including a tambourine and a "body hit" sample developed by Daniel. To emulate the sound of film scores, Daniel and Healy created most of the electronic synthesiser programming at their studio in Wilmslow using Logic. While some of these synths were kept in the song's final version, the artists collaborated with Crossey and Gilmore to recreate most of their original work, "trying to make them bigger and better". The producers incorporated a number of different synths into the track, with Crossey noting: "It doesn't sound like there are that many electronics in the song, but if you took them out it'd have a very different listening experience." This portion of the recording included a marimba from Spectrasonics Omnisphere, an ambient pad from Absynth and an arpeggio constructed using various soft synths from Vacuum, EXS24 and Massive.

Crossey, who mixed "Chocolate", said both himself and The 1975 had a "clear vision" of how they wanted the song to sound. Having already developed a rough edit of the track, the producer only wanted to create an improved version; Crossey was inspired by the "bottom-end vibe" of Foster the People's "Pumped Up Kicks" (2010), so his mixing work on "Chocolate" focused on the "bottom end" of the rhythm section and adjusting the song's groove. Elsewhere, the producer spent time developing the desired interaction between the vocals and the drums, seeking to construct the former with "some presence and wideness and vibe" to give Healy's voice "a sense of importance". On 21 January 2013, "Chocolate" was released as the lead single from Music for Cars by Dirty Hit, Polydor Records and Vagrant Records. The song was later included on The 1975, representing the album's fourth track.

"Chocolate" is considered the band's breakthrough hit in the United States, peaking at #80 on the US Billboard Hot 100.

== Music and lyrics ==
Musically, "Chocolate" is a pop, rock, funk and alt-rock song. The track has a length of three minutes and forty-four seconds (3:44) and was written by The 1975 members George Daniel, Healy, Adam Hann and Ross MacDonald, while the band handled the production alongside Crossey. According to the sheet music published at Musicnotes.com by Hal Leonard Music Publishing, "Chocolate" is set in the time signature of common time with a tempo of 100 beats per minute. The track is composed in the key of B major, with Healy's vocals ranging between the notes of B_{4} and F♯_{5}. It follows a chord progression of B–E–F♯–G♯m–C♯m–D♯m–A♯m.

The narrator sings about fleeing the police in his car with a stash of cannabis, with the term "chocolate" being a euphemism for cannabis.

Lead vocalist and rhythm guitarist Matty Healy called the song "a love letter to the authority figures in our town — you know about small town boredom, both by the kids and by the police."

== Music video ==
A music video to accompany the release of "Chocolate" was first released onto YouTube on 20 February 2013 at a total length of three minutes and forty-seven seconds. It was directed by Gareth Philips.

It is primarily filmed in and around the Limehouse area of London, featuring Canary Wharf, the Limehouse Link and Aspen way landmarks. The group are shown riding around in a vintage 1975 Ford Consul, originally from the British television show The Sweeney.

== Charts ==
=== Weekly charts ===
Chart (2013–2014)	Peak position
Belgium (Ultratip Bubbling Under Flanders)	15
Canada Hot 100 (Billboard)	99
Canada CHR/Top 40 (Billboard)	46
Ireland (IRMA)	9
Japan Hot 100 (Billboard)	29
Scottish Singles Sales (Official Charts)	18
Switzerland Airplay (Schweizer Hitparade)	92
UK Singles (Official Charts)	19
UK Indie (Official Charts)	2
US Billboard Hot 100	80
US Adult Pop Airplay (Billboard)	18
US Hot Rock & Alternative Songs (Billboard)	13
US Pop Airplay (Billboard)	25
US Rock & Alternative Airplay (Billboard)	41

=== Year-end charts ===
Chart (2013)	Position
UK Singles (Official Charts Company)	77

Chart (2014)	Position
US Hot Rock Songs (Billboard)	33
US Adult Alternative Songs (Billboard)	27

== Certifications ==
Region	Certification	Certified units/sales
Brazil (Pro-Música Brasil)	Gold	30,000^{‡}
Norway (IFPI Norway)	Gold	5,000^{‡}
United Kingdom (BPI)	3× Platinum	1,800,000^{‡}
United States (RIAA)	2× Platinum	2,000,000^{‡}
Streaming
Denmark (IFPI Danmark)	Gold	900,000^{†}
^{‡} Sales+streaming figures based on certification alone.^{†} Streaming-only figures based on certification alone.

== Release history ==
Region	Date	Format	Label
United Kingdom	4 March 2013	Contemporary hit radio	Dirty Hit
Italy	19 April 2013	Contemporary hit radio	Universal
United States	9 July 2013	Modern rock radio	Vargant; Interscope
United States	29 October 2013	Contemporary hit radio	Vargant; Interscope
United States	21 January 2014	Hot adult contemporary radio	Interscope

== See also ==
- The 1975 discography
- List of songs by Matty Healy
