= The 1975 =

English pop rock band

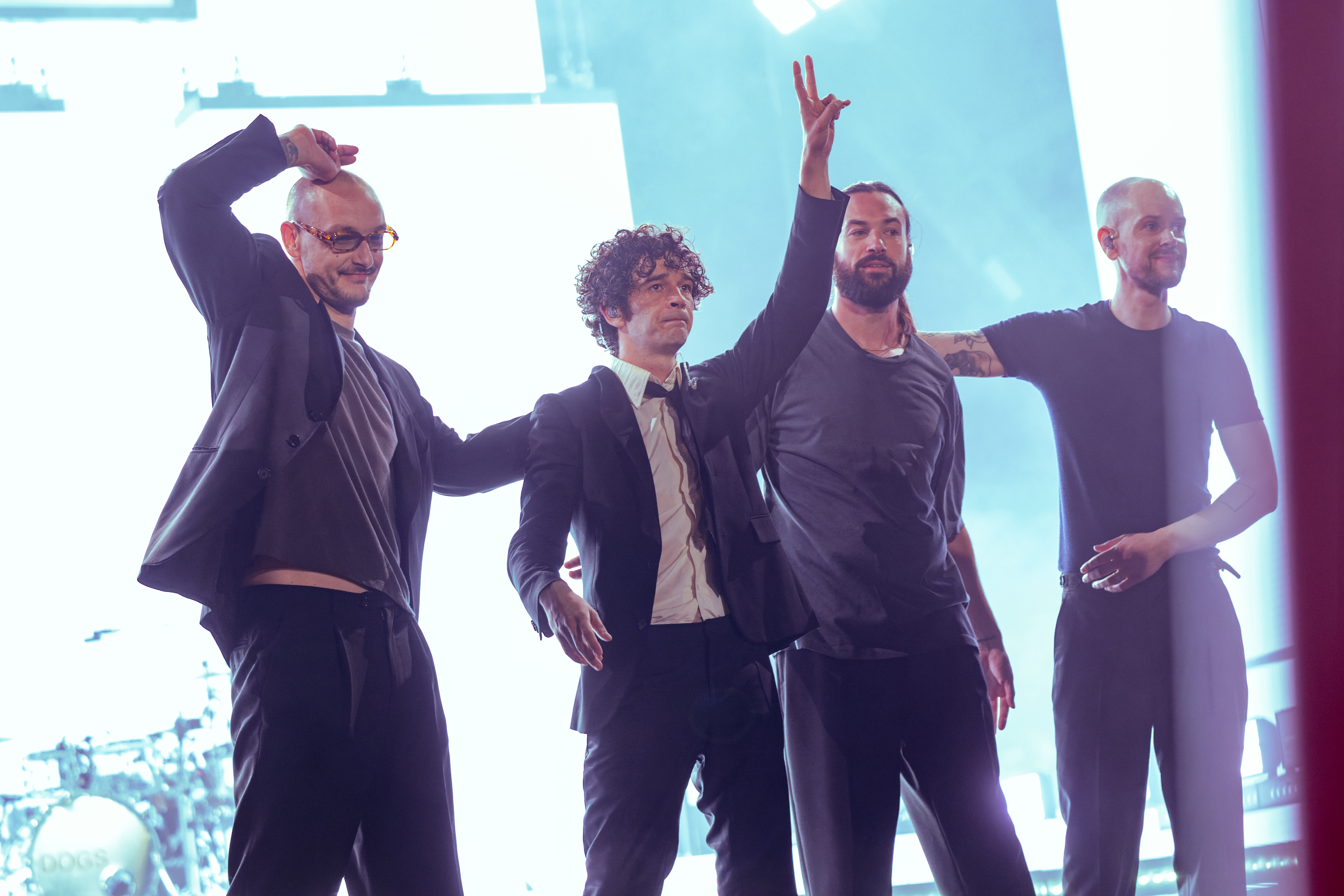
- The 1975 as headliners of Glastonbury Festival 2025. From left to right: George Daniel, Matty Healy, Ross MacDonald, and Adam Hann.

Background information
- Also known as: Drive Like I Do
- Origin: Wilmslow, Cheshire, England
- Genres: Pop rock; alternative pop; art pop; synth-pop; new wave; indie rock
- Years active: 2002–present
- Labels: Dirty Hit; Polydor; Vagrant; Interscope
- Members: Adam Hann; Matty Healy; Ross MacDonald; George Daniel
- Website: the1975.com

The 1975 are an English pop rock band formed in Wilmslow, Cheshire in 2002. The band consists of Matty Healy (lead vocals, rhythm guitar, primary songwriter), Adam Hann (lead guitar), Ross MacDonald (bass) and George Daniel (drums, primary producer). The band's name was inspired by a page of scribblings found in Healy's preowned copy of On the Road by Jack Kerouac which was dated "1 June, The 1975".

The band members met in secondary school and first performed together as teenagers in 2002, before professionally releasing music in 2012 under the independent label Dirty Hit. From 2012 to 2013, they opened for several major acts and released a series of extended plays—Facedown, Sex, Music for Cars and IV—before releasing their UK chart-topping self-titled debut album (2013), which included the popular singles "Sex", "Chocolate" and "Robbers".

All of the band's albums hit No. 1 in the United Kingdom and charted in the Billboard 200, garnering critical praise and appearing in numerous publications' year-end and decade-end lists. Their second album, I Like It When You Sleep, for You Are So Beautiful yet So Unaware of It (2016), also reached No. 1 in the US, Canada, Australia and New Zealand and its box set received a nomination for Best Boxed or Special Limited Edition Package at the 59th Grammy Awards. The band's third album, A Brief Inquiry into Online Relationships (2018), received widespread acclaim and won British Album of the Year at the 2019 Brit Awards with its single "Give Yourself a Try" earning a nomination for Best Rock Song at the 62nd Annual Grammy Awards. It was followed by Notes on a Conditional Form (2020) and Being Funny in a Foreign Language (2022) with the latter receiving a nomination for British Album of the Year at the 2023 Brit Awards.

Rolling Stone stated that the band has been at "the forefront of modern pop rock" since their debut, with Billboard declaring them "the most ambitious pop-rock band of their generation". Pitchfork has described them as a "band of friends" who "ascended from scrappy emo rockers to global superstars". Entertainment Weekly has characterised them as "British Phenoms", NME has proclaimed them as "Art Pop Heroes", and the BBC has called them "Modern Pop Icons". They have received several awards and nominations including four Brit Awards, two Ivor Novello Awards, as well as two nominations for the Mercury Prize and two nominations for Grammy Awards. In addition, they have been awarded "Band of the Decade" at the 2020 NME Awards.

== History ==
=== 2002–2011: Formation ===
In 2002, at Wilmslow High School, guitarist Adam Hann recruited Matty Healy to be the drummer in a band he was forming with bassist Ross MacDonald. Hann wanted to start a band because a local council worker had begun organising gigs for teenagers and he wanted to play at one. When the band's prospective singer, Elliott Williams (now of Editors), dropped out after one rehearsal, Healy took over vocal duties, playing double duty as lead vocalist and drummer. He eventually gave up drumming to George Daniel, later recalling that meeting Daniel "changed his life". Daniel describes his first impression of Healy as "the most outwardly passionate person in school—endearing, and intimidating." The quartet began as a band playing covers of punk and emo songs at school and at Healy's house before eventually writing their own material.

To keep the band together, Hann, MacDonald and Daniel all went to university in Manchester while Healy briefly attended music school. They played gigs and recorded their own music while working as delivery boys at a local Chinese restaurant. By 2010, the band was being managed by Jamie Oborne but remained unsigned due to their genre-hopping approach, so he set up his own independent record label, Dirty Hit, and signed the band for £20. Before settling on the name The 1975, the band performed under several names, including Me and You Versus Them, Those 1975s, Forever Drawing Six, Talkhouse, the Slowdown and Bigsleep. They were also known as Drive Like I Do before adopting their current name in 2012. Healy recounted that the final name was inspired by scribblings found on the back page of the book On the Road by Jack Kerouac.

I found a page of scribblings [on Jack Kerouac's On the Road]. It wasn't really disturbing or dark or anything...the important thing that stuck with me was that the page was dated '1st June, The 1975'. At the time I just thought that the word 'The' preceding a date was a strong use of language. I never thought it would be something that would later come to be so important. When it came to naming the band, it was perfect.

=== 2012–2014: Early career and self-titled debut album ===
The band's logo which was prominently used from 2012 to 2016

The band's self-titled debut album was recorded with Mike Crossey. Between autumn 2012 and spring 2013, during which time the album was recorded, the band released four EPs. They toured to support and build momentum for the album, including numerous gigs and special appearances with other artists.

The album received positive reviews from critics, and topped the UK Albums Chart on 8 September. As of March 2016, it had sold 410,981 copies in the UK, and 390,000 copies in the US. Critics at Pitchfork have favourably compared them to the Big Pink. Sex EP was described by Paste as "equal parts ethereal and synth pop", with "haunting" and "smooth" vocals. Their "mellow", stripped down style was praised for its lack of "attention-grabbing production theatrics".

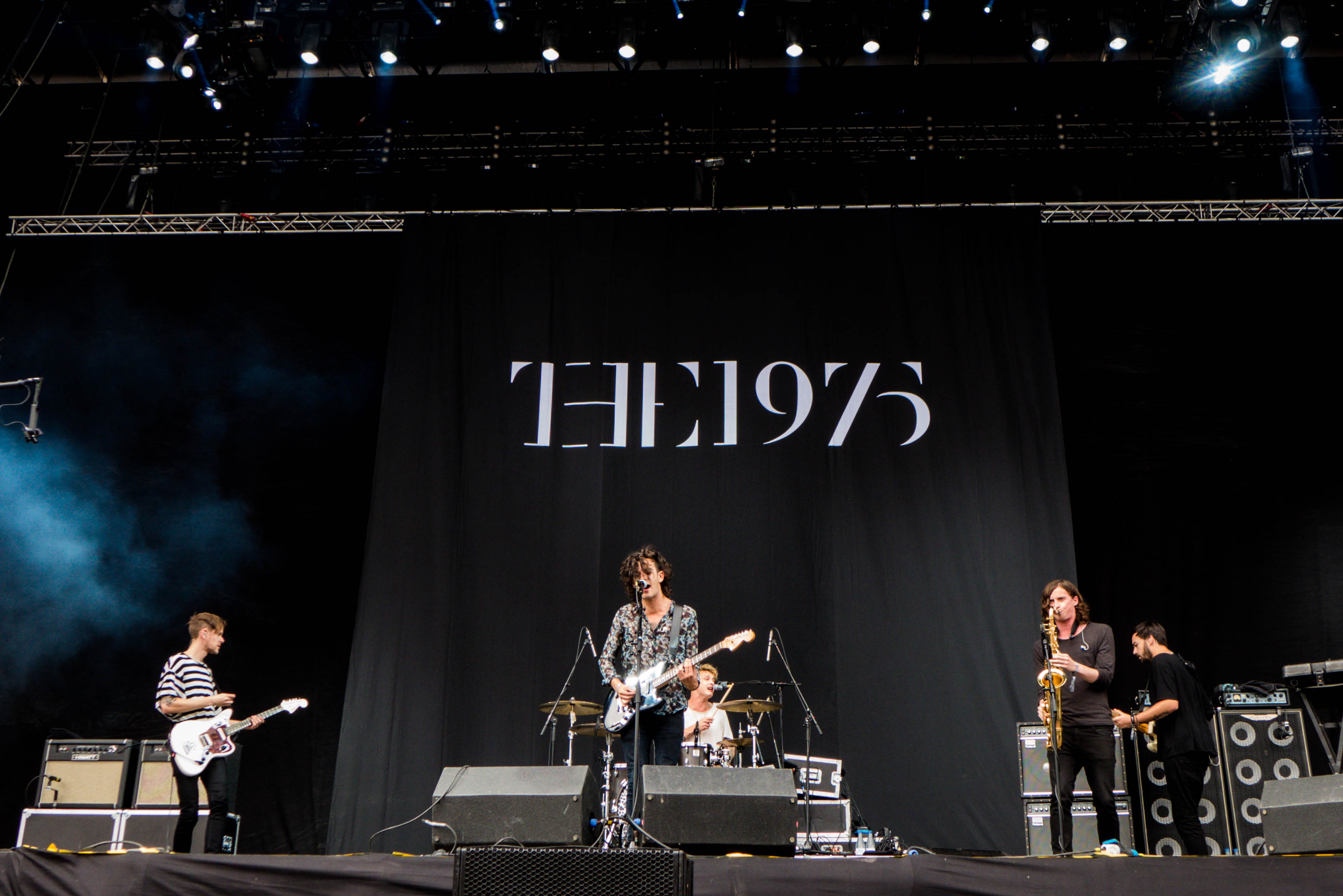
The 1975 performing in 2014

The release of the band's first EP, titled Facedown, in August 2012 saw the band's first UK airplay on national radio with lead track "The City", which was also featured as part of a BBC Introducing show with Huw Stephens on BBC Radio 1. The 1975 once again garnered national radio attention in late 2012, with BBC Radio 1 DJ Zane Lowe championing their single "Sex" from the eponymous EP, which was released on 19 November. They embarked on a United Kingdom and Ireland tour extended into early 2013, before beginning a US tour in Spring 2014. Upon the release of Music for Cars on 4 March 2013, the 1975 found mainstream chart success with "Chocolate", reaching number 19 in the UK Singles Chart. On 20 May 2013 the band released IV, which included a new version of "The City". The track charted in the UK and received airplay in several other countries.

The 1975 toured extensively to support releases and to build hype before releasing their debut. The band supported Muse on the second leg of The 2nd Law World Tour at the Emirates Stadium in London on 26 May 2013. They also toured with the Neighbourhood in the United States in June 2013, and supported the Rolling Stones in Hyde Park on 13 July. In August, the band performed on the Festival Republic Stage at 2013 Reading and Leeds Festivals.

In a feature article, Elliot Mitchell of When the Gramophone Rings wrote that releasing a string of EPs before the debut album was "a move that he deemed necessary to provide context to the band's broad sound, rather than just building up with singles alone." Healy said, "We wouldn't have been able to release the album without putting out the EP's first, as we wanted to make sure we could express ourselves properly before dropping this long, ambitious debut record on people."

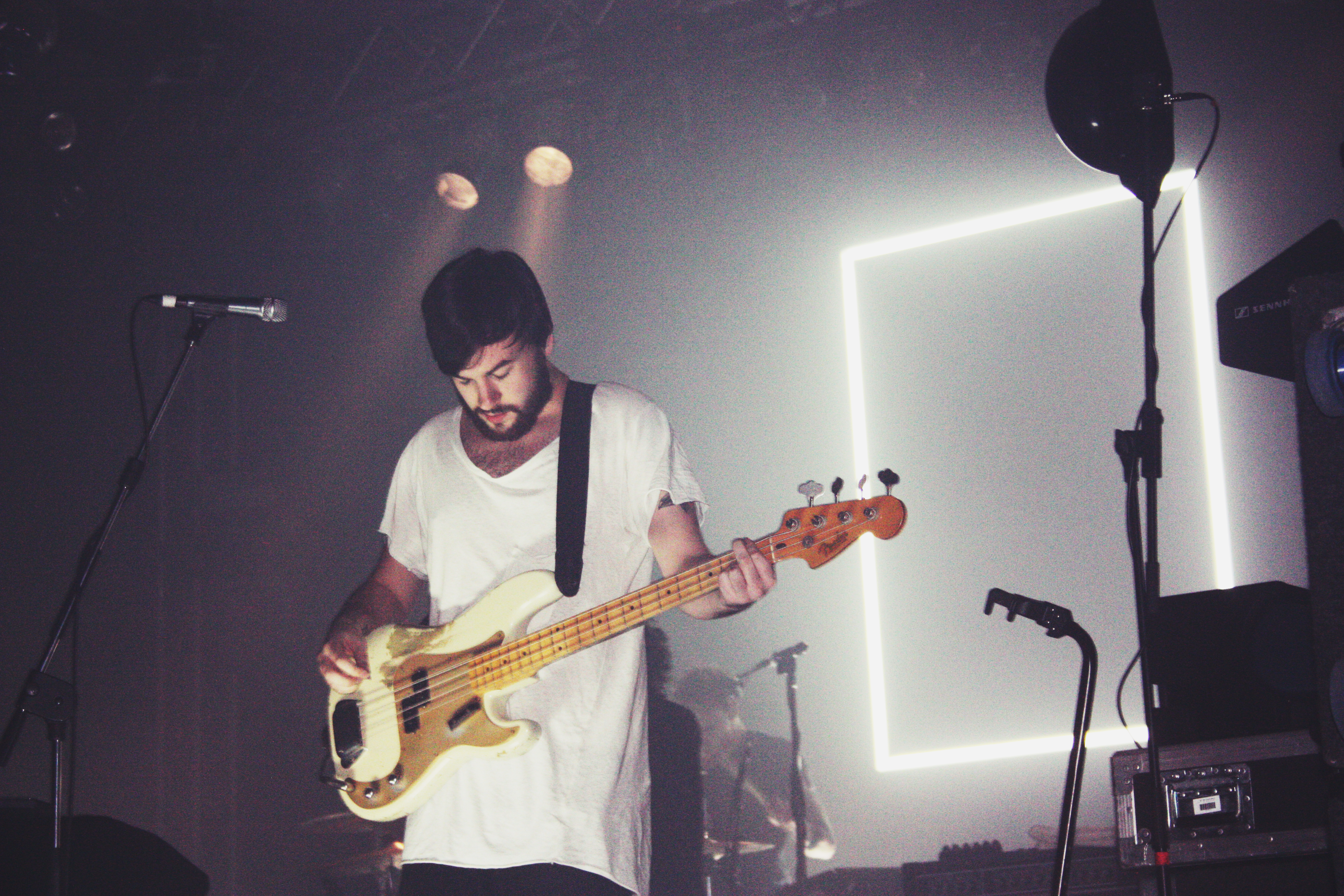
MacDonald performing in Italy in 2014

Their self-titled debut, The 1975, was released on 2 September 2013, co-produced by Mike Crossey, known for his work with Arctic Monkeys and Foals. The 1975 were selling out shows even before the debut of their full-length album as Healy recalled in an interview with Larry Heath of The AU Review. The lead single was a re-worked "Sex", which was released on 26 August 2013. The song premiered on Zane Lowe's BBC Radio 1 show on 8 July 2013, and a music video premiered on YouTube on 26 July. The 1975 debuted at number one on the UK Albums Chart.

Public reaction to the band's music has been mixed, particularly on social media platforms like Twitter, "perhaps the last public space for unfettered music criticism in an increasingly anti-critical landscape", according to Vice magazine's Larry Fitzmaurice in 2016. In an essay on the critical response, he said they have been "the Most Hated and Loved Band in the World" and described "as underrated and overhyped, although the needle has far more often swung towards the former direction". Veteran rock critic Robert Christgau said he thinks "they suck" and should not be called a "rock band" as they do not "rock". In Fitzmaurice's opinion, the band's debut album was mainly a straightforward rock album recorded "with a soft-focus and especially British sensibility", while I Like It When You Sleep was only rock music in the loosest sense of the word. Overall, he said their music is pop "in the realm of Alternative", most comparable to INXS.

The 1975 toured in the UK in September 2013, among others performing in Kingston upon Hull as headliners at Freedom Festival, a celebration of the city's shortlisting for 2017 UK City of Culture designation, and at iTunes Festival on 8 September as an opening act for indie electronic quartet Bastille.

The band undertook a North American tour in October 2013, a European tour for November, and in January 2014 the band performed in New Zealand and Australia. In September 2013, the band performed three sold-out shows at London's Shepherd's Bush Empire. In April 2014, the band performed for the first time in a major American music and arts festival: Coachella. The band played at Royal Albert Hall the same month. In May, the band's recorded output was distributed digitally while they were touring North America. Healy noted that the band had recording scheduled in Q2 2015.

=== 2015–2017: I Like It When You Sleep, for You Are So Beautiful yet So Unaware of It ===
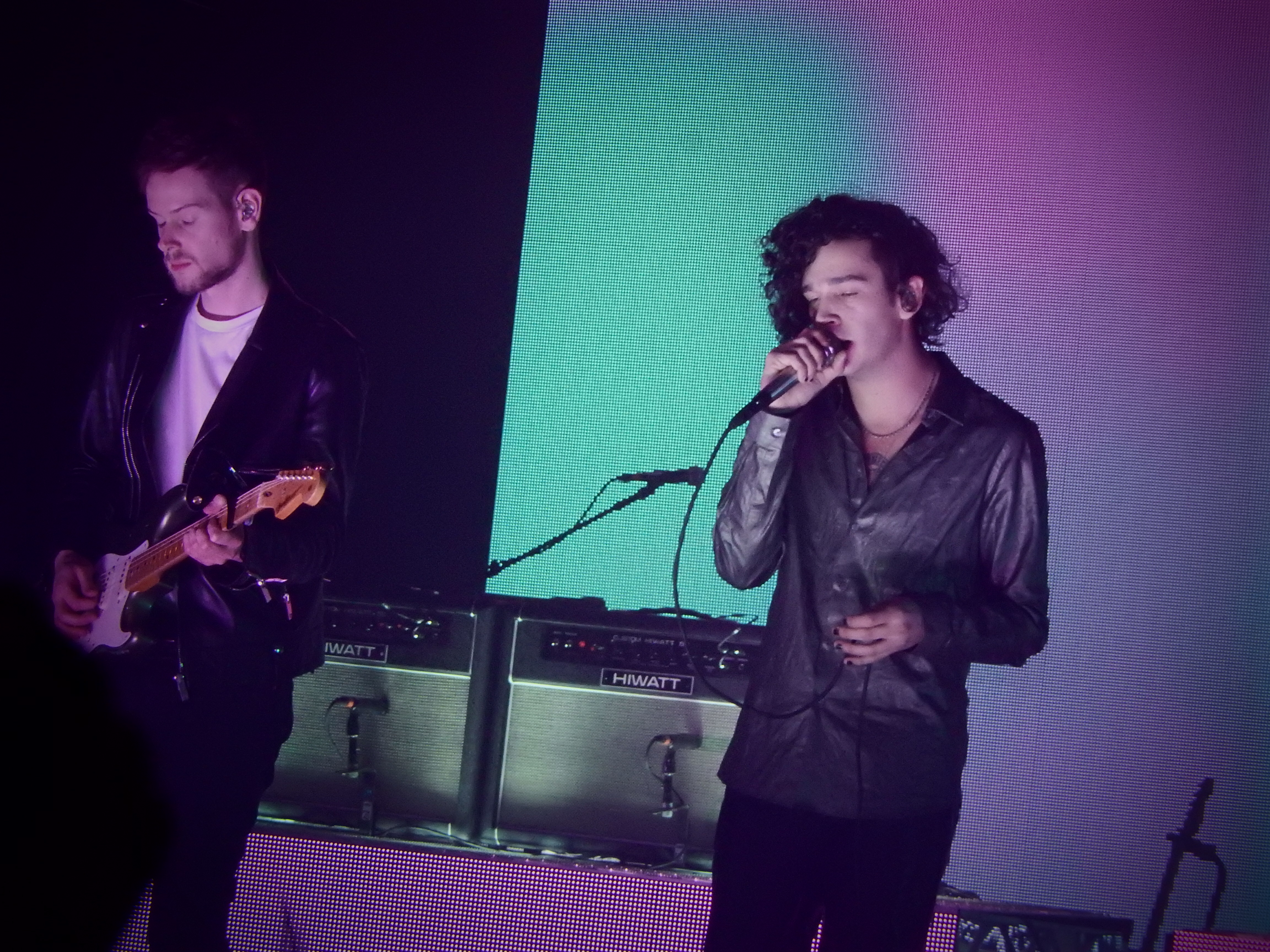
Hann and Healy performing in the United Kingdom in 2016

On 1 June 2015, the band's social accounts were terminated, which caused intense speculation. A comic strip was posted on Healy's Twitter a day prior but was later posted on their manager's (Jamie Oborne) account, which suggested the band's break-up. The next day, the accounts were reinstated, but the cover images and profile photos were white and light pink, instead of the usual black and white, revealing it to be a publicity stunt.

On 8 October, the band announced their second album, I Like It When You Sleep, for You Are So Beautiful yet So Unaware of It. They premiered the lead single, "Love Me", simultaneously scheduling a support tour in Europe, North America, and Asia. They premiered the second single, "UGH!", on 10 December on Beats 1. The album's third single, "The Sound" debuted on BBC Radio 1 on 14 January 2016. The 1975 released the fourth single "Somebody Else" on 15 February on Beats 1 before the album's release. "A Change of Heart" premiered on Radio 1 on 22 February, four days prior to the album's release.

NME, who had previously been highly critical of the band, praised the album for its scope and ambition, writing that "Any record that burrows as deep into your psyche as 'I Like It…' should be considered essential. It's hugely clever and wryly funny, too." They later named it their Album of the Year for 2016. Although music journalist Alexis Petridis noted that parts of the album were over-ambitious, he went on to claim that "incredibly, though, most of the time Healy gets away with it. That's sometimes because his observations are sharp — as a skewering of celebrity squad culture, 'you look famous, let's be friends / And portray we possess something important / And do the things we like' is pretty acute — but more usually because they come loaded with witty self-awareness and deprecation: the endless depictions of vacuous, coke-numbed girls he has met would get wearying were it not for the fact that he keeps turning the lyrical crosshair on himself." In a more mixed review, Rolling Stone criticised tracks like "Lostmyhead" and "Please Be Naked" for being "boring-melty" but praised songs such as "Somebody Else", "Loving Someone" and "Love Me".

The album was released on 26 February and topped the UK Albums Chart and the US Billboard 200. The band released a free download for "How to Draw" on Twitter and through Target Exclusive. It was shortlisted for the 2016 Mercury Music Prize and nominated for Album of the Year at the 2017 Brit Awards.

=== 2017–2019: A Brief Inquiry into Online Relationships ===
On 13 November 2016, member George Daniel teased the band's third album by releasing a video on his Instagram account captioned "2018", containing snippets of audio along with Healy playing the keyboards.

On 3 April 2017, Healy tweeted "I like it when you sleep is coming to an end" before following up with "Music for Cars", which shares the name of their third extended play. In March 2017, the band confirmed that two songs for the new album had already been written. In June, Healy also confirmed that Drive Like I Do, one of the 1975's prior incarnations, will release a debut album as a side project 'in a few years'.

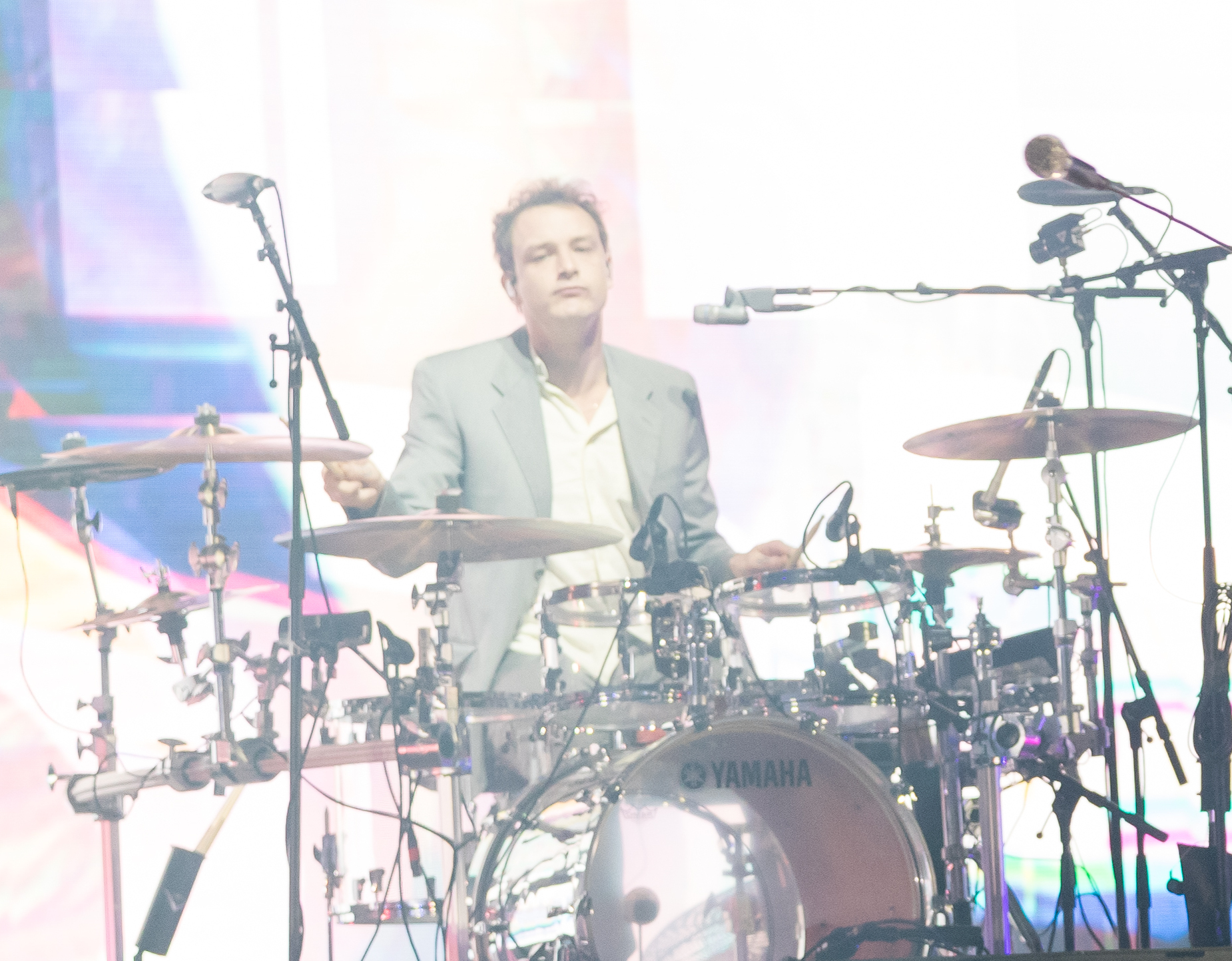
Daniel performing in Germany in 2019

In November, Healy teased the release of an EP within 2017. Besides being confirmed, the EP was delayed to 2018, with manager Jamie Oborne stating that "something" would be released instead; this was the band's debut live album, DH00278. He also confirmed that no singles from Music for Cars will be released in 2017, with the band confirming that something will be released on 1 June 2018. In March 2018, the band deleted many media posts across their accounts going back to July 2017, during their final show at Latitude Festival for I Like It When You Sleep, for You Are So Beautiful yet So Unaware of It. On 22 April 2018, in response to a fan comment on Twitter, Oborne stated that their second album's campaign would remain for "a few more days". At the end of April, cryptic posters titled "Music for Cars" appeared in London and Manchester, containing taglines and a Dirty Hit catalogue number, DH00327, amongst a black background. Various billboards were also spotted in the United Kingdom, having used détournement to apply themselves over existing advertisements. The band updated their website to display a timer counting down towards 1 June at the beginning of May 2018, becoming active again on social media. Within its first hours, it was revealed to contain a hidden zip file with four individual posters, each of the names leading to a hidden page on the website that displayed a conversation between a 'human' and a 'machine'. Over social media, the band frequently released different posters, all titled "A Brief Inquiry Into Online Relationships". On 31 May 2018, the band released the single "Give Yourself a Try", after premiering as Annie Mac's "Hottest Record in the World" on BBC Radio 1 that same day.

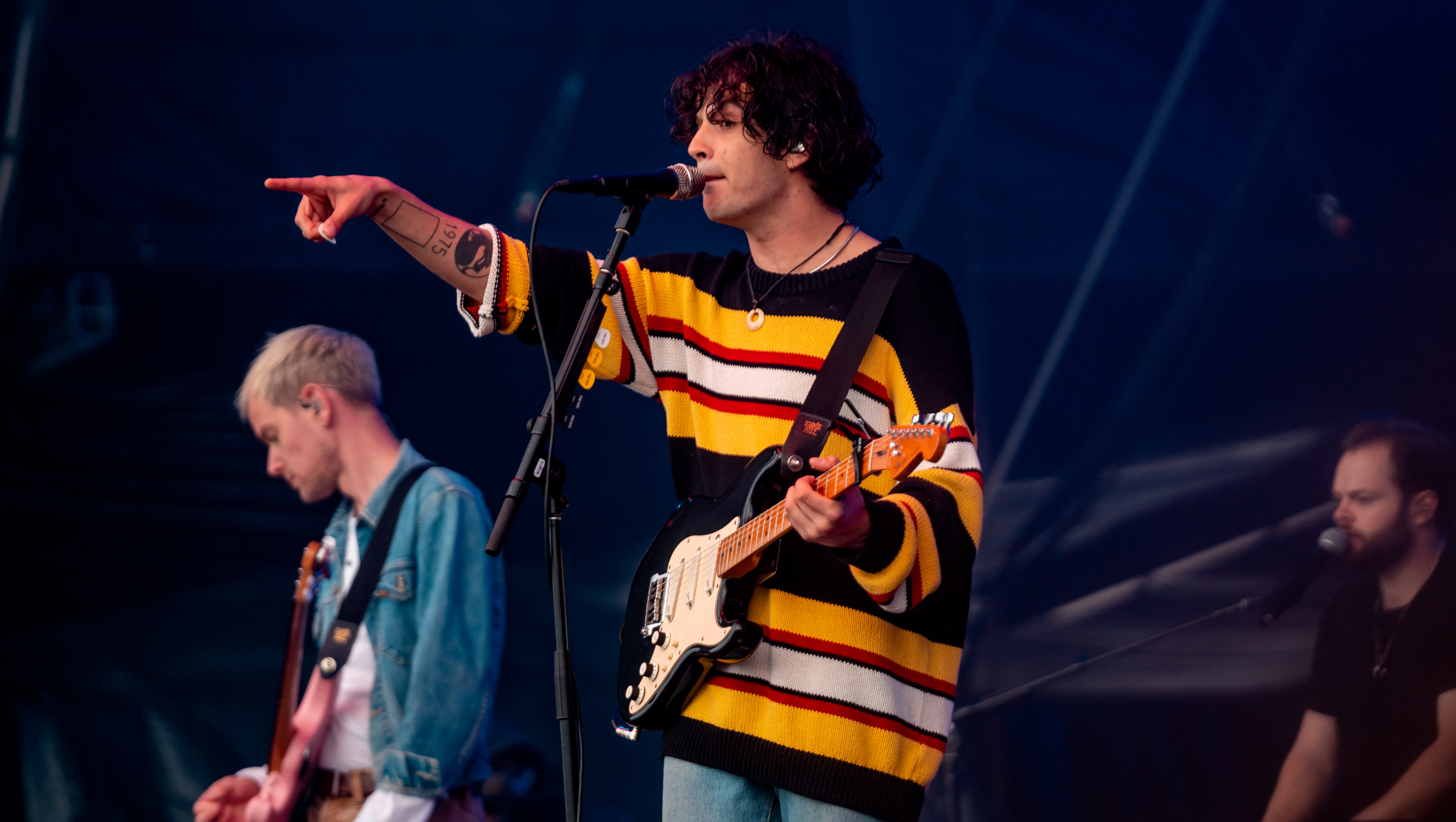
Hann and Healy performing in Poland in 2019

The album garnered almost universal praise from critics. According to review aggregator Metacritic, the album has received a weighted score of 83 based on 29 reviews, indicating "universal acclaim". Ryan Dombal of Pitchfork gave the album a score of 8.5, earning it the Best New Music tag, and called it "outrageous and eclectic", as well as "similar to its predecessor in its boundless sense of style, swerving from Afrobeats to brushed-snare jazz balladry to one track that sounds like a trap remix of a Bon Iver ayahuasca trip", but "more purposeful" than I Like It When You Sleep. Time considered it one of the Best Albums of 2018, placing it at number nine on their list.

However, Conrad Duncan writing for the same site gave the album a positive review, calling it "full of genuine heart, intelligence and wit". Popmatters criticised the album as bloated and inconsistent, stating "The band's reach exceeds their grasp here, and vocalist/band leader Matt Healy's indulgences are often more tiresome than charming", while still praising it as "fascinating". Healy, in an interview for Beats 1, said that "Music for Cars" is more of an era to release music, after renaming Music for Cars to A Brief Inquiry Into Online Relationships. It was released on 30 November 2018. The band headlined both Radio 1's Big Weekend in Stewart Park, Middlesbrough on 26 May 2019 and Reading and Leeds Festival in August 2019.

The album was shortlisted for the 2019 Mercury Music Prize and won the award for British Album of the Year at the 2019 Brit Awards.

=== 2020–2021: Notes on a Conditional Form ===
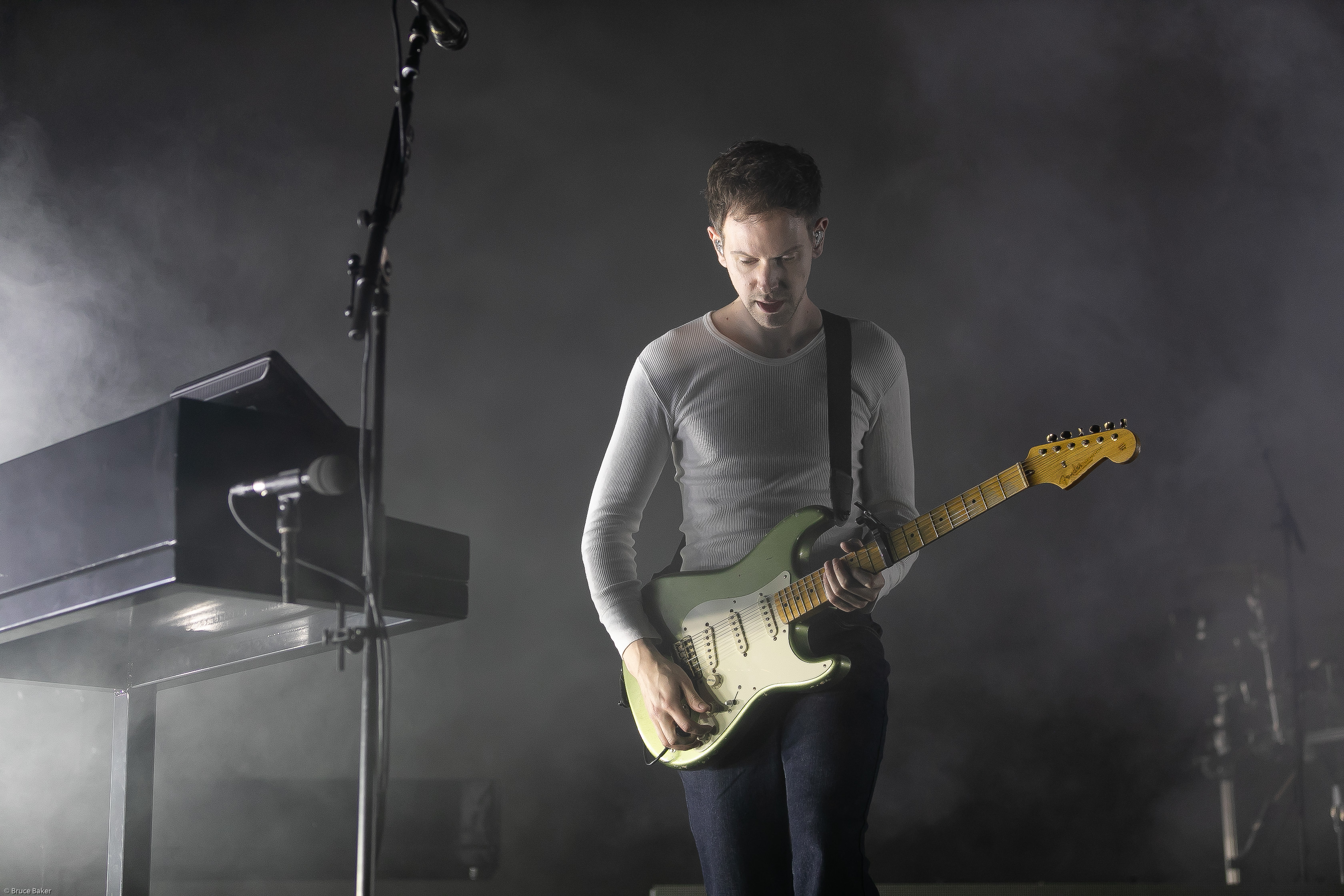
Hann performing in Australia in 2020

On 24 July 2019, the opening song of Notes on a Conditional Form, titled "The 1975", was released, featuring climate activist Greta Thunberg, the proceeds of the song going to Extinction Rebellion. The lead single, entitled "People", was released on 22 August 2019. This was announced by a countdown on the band's social media accounts, including small snippets of lyrics from the song that fans could piece together. A second single, titled "Frail State of Mind", was released on 24 October. The music video for the song was released on 30 November 2019. The next single, "Me & You Together Song", was released on 16 January 2020.

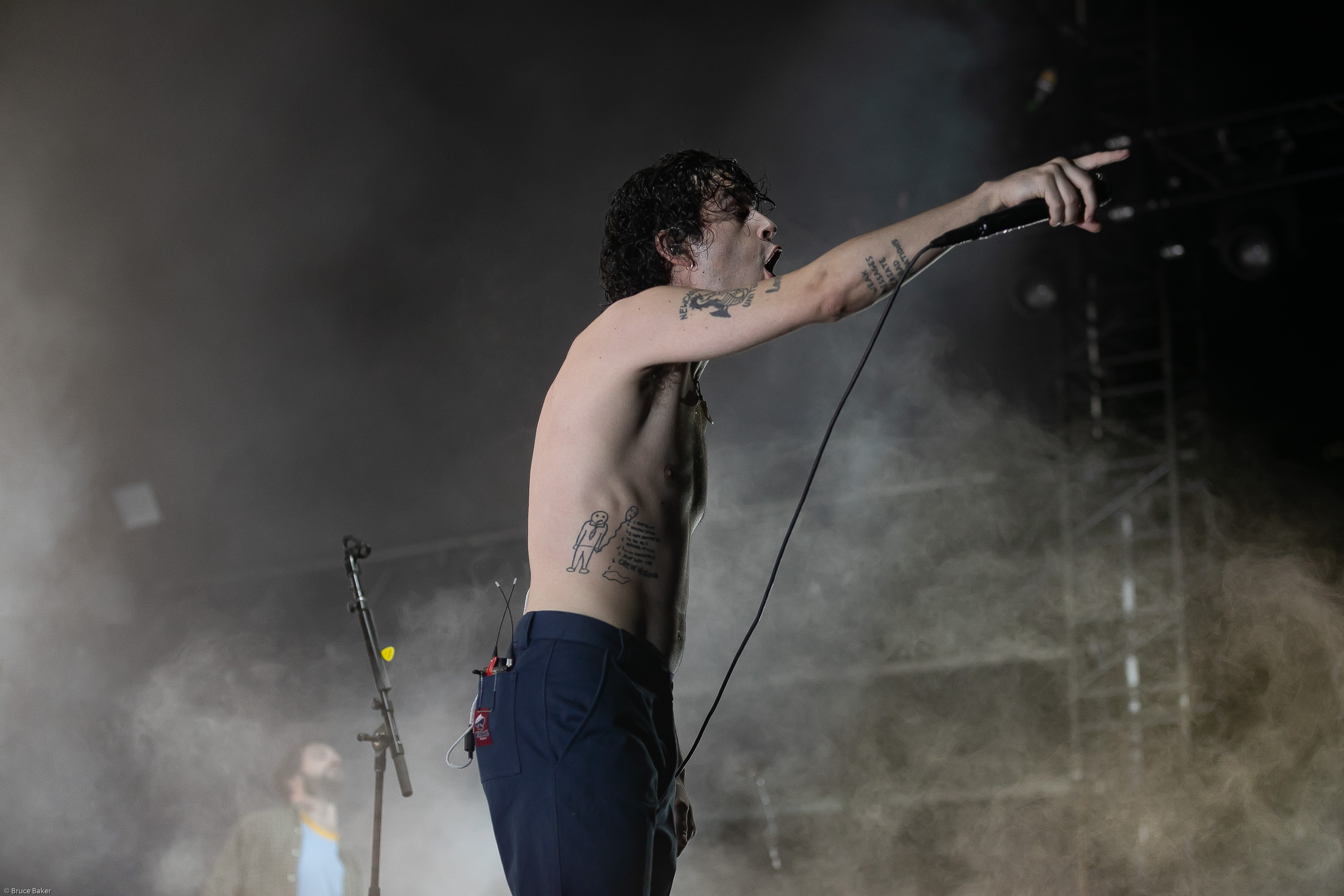
Healy performing in Australia in 2020

On 15 February, the group did their UK tour that lasted until 3 March 2020. On 15 February, The 1975 began a UK tour that lasted until 3 March 2020. The tour began in Nottingham's Motor point arena and ended in Dublin.On 17 February 2020, the band put up a "digital detox" website called MindShowerAI which contained a countdown to their next single as well as several odd messages like "I am doing my mind and my life!" and "I feel comfort and respect." A fourth single, 'The Birthday Party', was released on 19 February 2020 at the end of the website's countdown. On 3 April, the band released "Jesus Christ 2005 God Bless America", featuring guest vocals from Phoebe Bridgers, which was followed by "If You're Too Shy (Let Me Know)", featuring guest vocals by FKA Twigs, on 23 April 2020.

The band's fourth album, Notes on a Conditional Form, was released on 22 May 2020. It became the band's fourth consecutive album to reach number one on the UK Albums Chart as well as reaching number one in Australia and number four in the United States. On 4 December 2020, the album became certified silver in the UK via Brits certified.

Many of the band's 2020 shows which were postponed due to the COVID-19 pandemic were ultimately cancelled. During this time, lead singer Matty Healy teased future music under the name "Drive Like I Do", and said that the band was working on their fifth studio album, although there was no indication as to when writing, recording, mixing, etc. would be complete.

In February 2021, No Rome, a Dirty Hit labelmate, announced he was working on a track featuring the 1975 along with Charli XCX, which would make it the second No Rome single to feature the band after 2018's "Narcissist". The track's title is "Spinning" and was released on 4 March 2021. An EP that Healy and Daniel produced and co-wrote, Beabadoobee's Our Extended Play, was released in March 2021. In October 2021, Healy opened for Phoebe Bridgers at the Greek Theatre in Los Angeles on her Reunion Tour. He performed two songs, including an early, untitled version of All I Need to Hear.

=== 2022–2025: Being Funny in a Foreign Language ===
On 14 February 2022, the band deactivated their main social media accounts, hinting at new material. On 1 June, the band's social media accounts were re-activated, and the beginning of a new era was signalled by a series of posts, and updates to the band's official website.

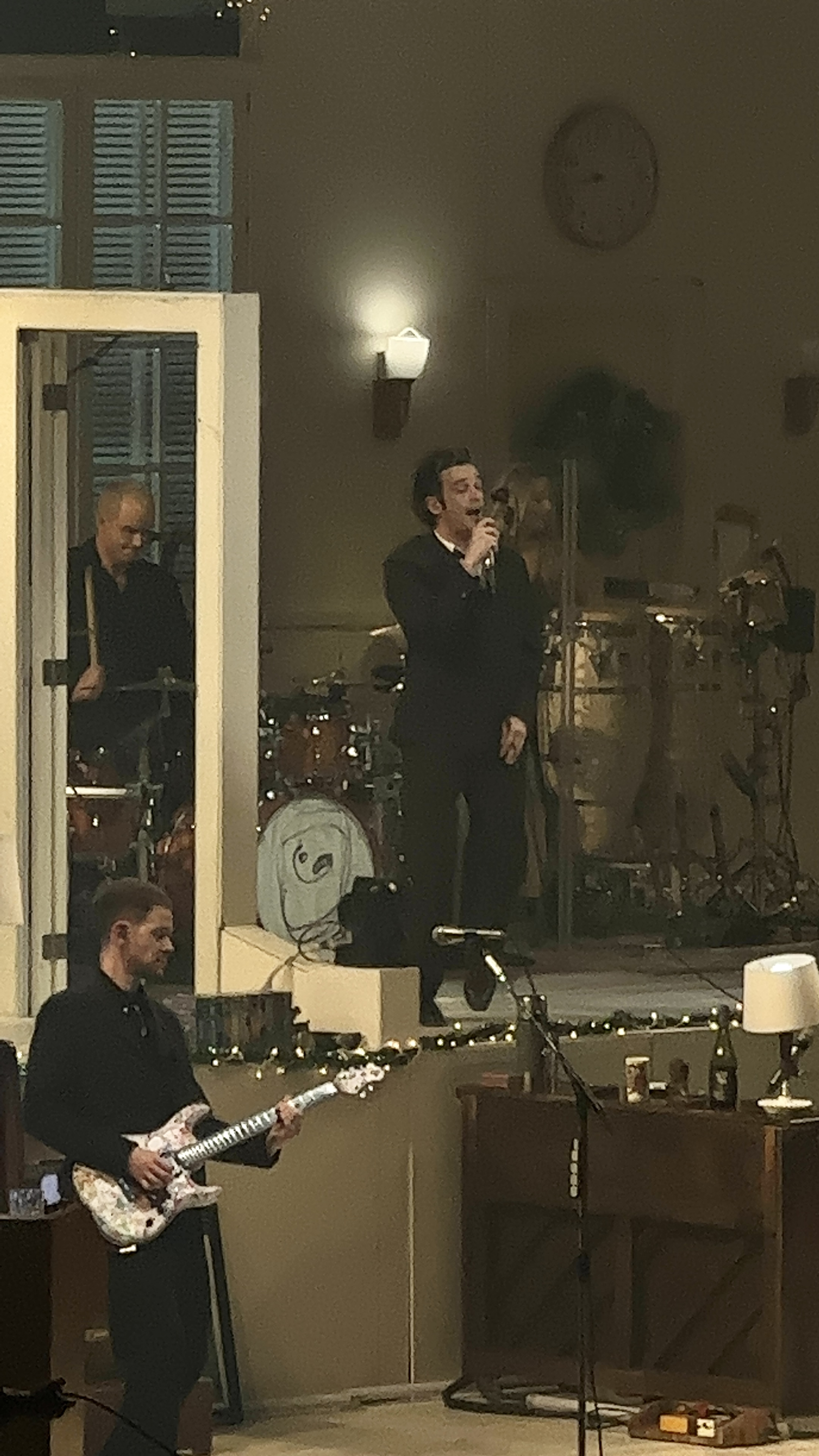
Hann, Daniel, and Healy performing in the United States in 2022

In late June 2022, the first single "Part of the Band" from their fifth album Being Funny in a Foreign Language was teased. Postcards sent to fans revealed an album track listing, while posters of Healy in London promoted the single. The lyrics of "Part of the Band" were posted by Healy on Instagram. The song was released on 7 July. On 14 October, the album was released. On 1 October, the band appeared on BBC Two's Later... with Jools Holland.

On 7 November 2022, the band performed a sold-out show at Madison Square Garden, which was also live-streamed on Twitch. The show—one of the first few in their At Their Very Best tour—was highly acclaimed with some critics praising it for its boldness, while others wrote that the band proved they really were "at their very best." It received five star reviews from the Rolling Stone, NME, The Observer, The Telegraph, Evening Standard, and Metro.

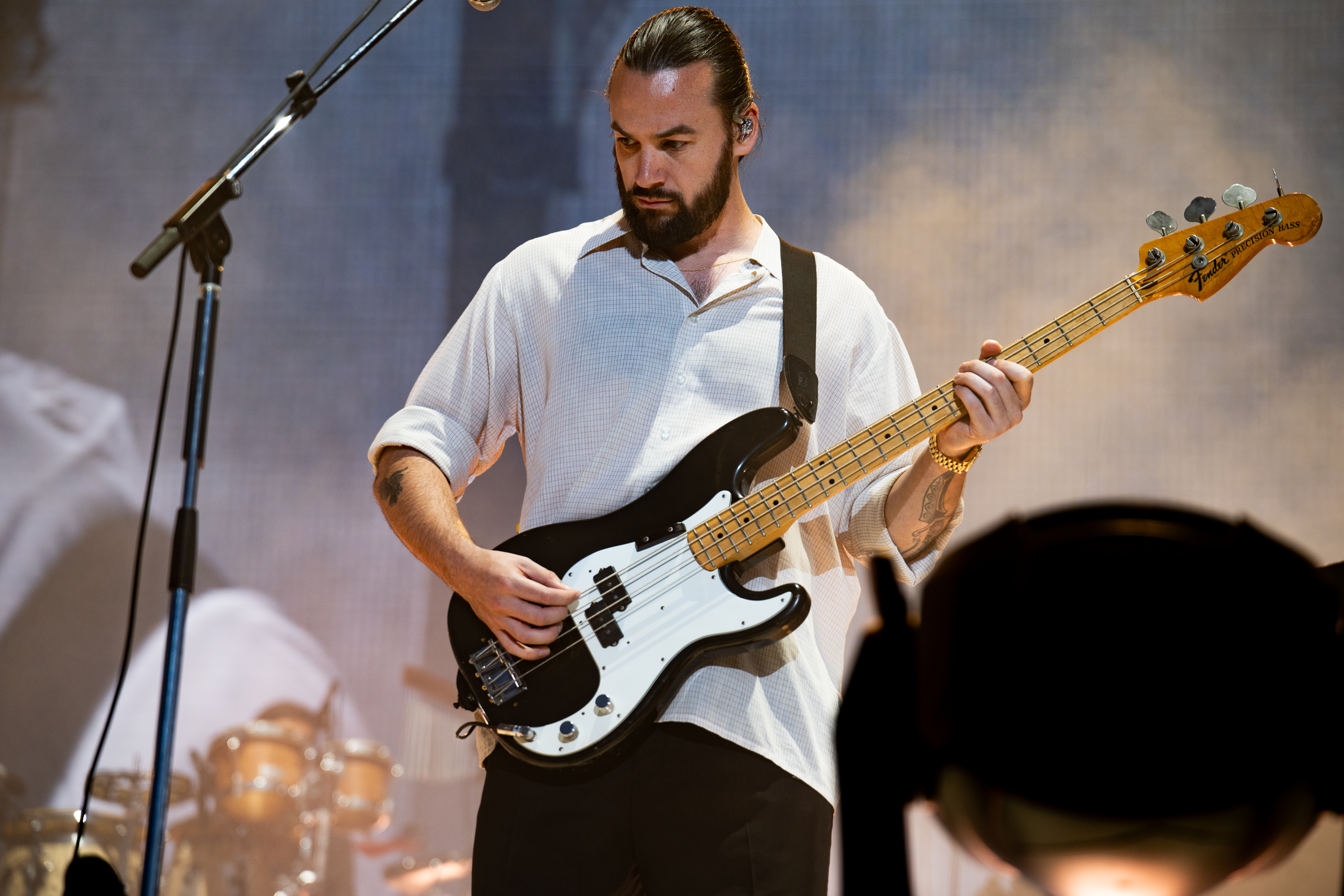
MacDonald performing in Germany in 2023

The band was banned from performing in Malaysia due to "controversial conduct and remarks" during their performance at the Good Vibes Festival on 21 July 2023. This included a same-sex kiss onstage between Healy and MacDonald, and Healy openly criticising the country's strong anti-LGBT laws. The remainder of the festival was then cancelled by local authorities. Malaysian authorities forced the organisers to immediately halt and cancelled the rest of the three-day festival citing that Healy's "controversial conduct and remarks" are "against the traditions and values of the local culture". Reactions to the incident from Malaysians on social media were generally critical of Healy. Some members of the LGBT community in Malaysia were frustrated by the incident and expressed concern it would lead to further reprisals from the religious right. The band subsequently cancelled shows in Taiwan and Indonesia following the incident. The organisers of the festival sued the band in the High Court for breach of contract and sought £1.9 million in damages.

In August 2023, they headlined Reading and Leeds Festivals for the third time with a "10th Anniversary Performance" of their self-titled debut album. Their fifth concert tour commenced in September 2023, titled Still... At Their Very Best. It is their biggest tour to date in North America performing in arenas across the United States and Canada. In the opening show in Sacramento, Healy has stated that after the tour, the band will have a hiatus from touring.

In October 2024, two billboards themed around Charli XCX's upcoming remix album Brat and It's Completely Different but Also Still Brat were displayed in the band's hometown, Manchester, signifying that the band will feature on the remixed version of the song "I might say something stupid" with Jon Hopkins. The band released their live recording, Still... At Their Very Best (Live From The AO Arena, Manchester, 17.02.24) in March 2025.

=== 2025-present: Dogs ===
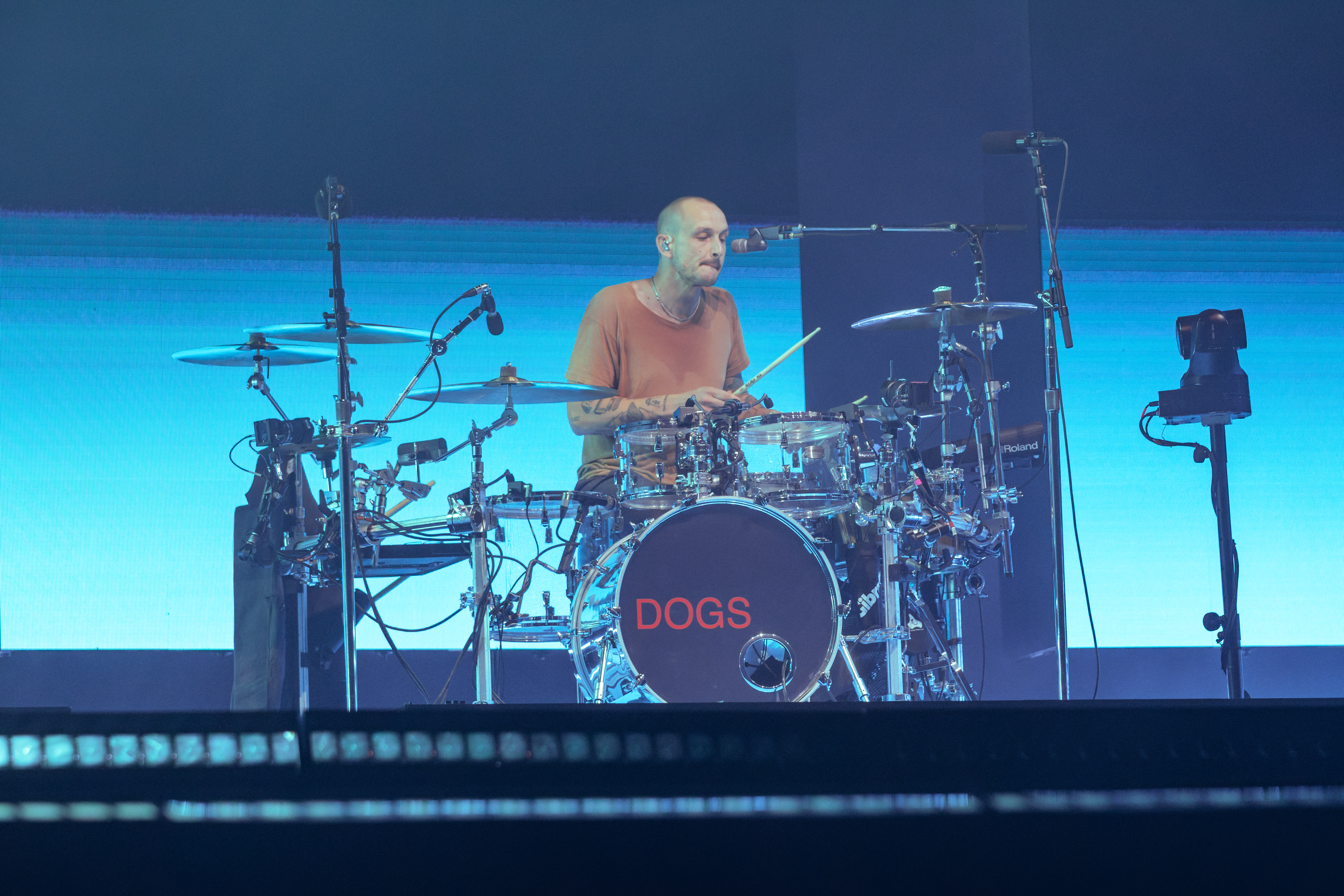
Daniel performing their headlining set at the Pyramid Stage of Glastonbury Festival 2025, with the "DOGS" text visible

On 6 March 2025, the band's social media accounts were updated to feature a new logo, alongside the announcement of their headlining set at Glastonbury Festival later that year. In May 2025, manager Jamie Oborne confirmed this set would be their only concert of the year. This statement was accompanied with the news that the band were working on their sixth studio album, with Oborne stating "I don't know when it will come out, but they're making one." The band played on Glastonbury Festival's Pyramid Stage on Friday, 27 June 2025. Their performance received praise with The Guardian's Alexis Petridis describing the band as "world-class", and their set "hugely impressive".

Following the performance, fan speculation ensued due to the presence of the word "DOGS" on the bass drum of Daniel, as well as its appearance on screen after the conclusion of their set. In December 2025, Healy confirmed "DOGS" was the title of the band's upcoming studio album during an event at Gateshead College while speaking to a fan, additionally stating "It might be one, it might be two… but yeah, we've made two albums."

== Artistry ==
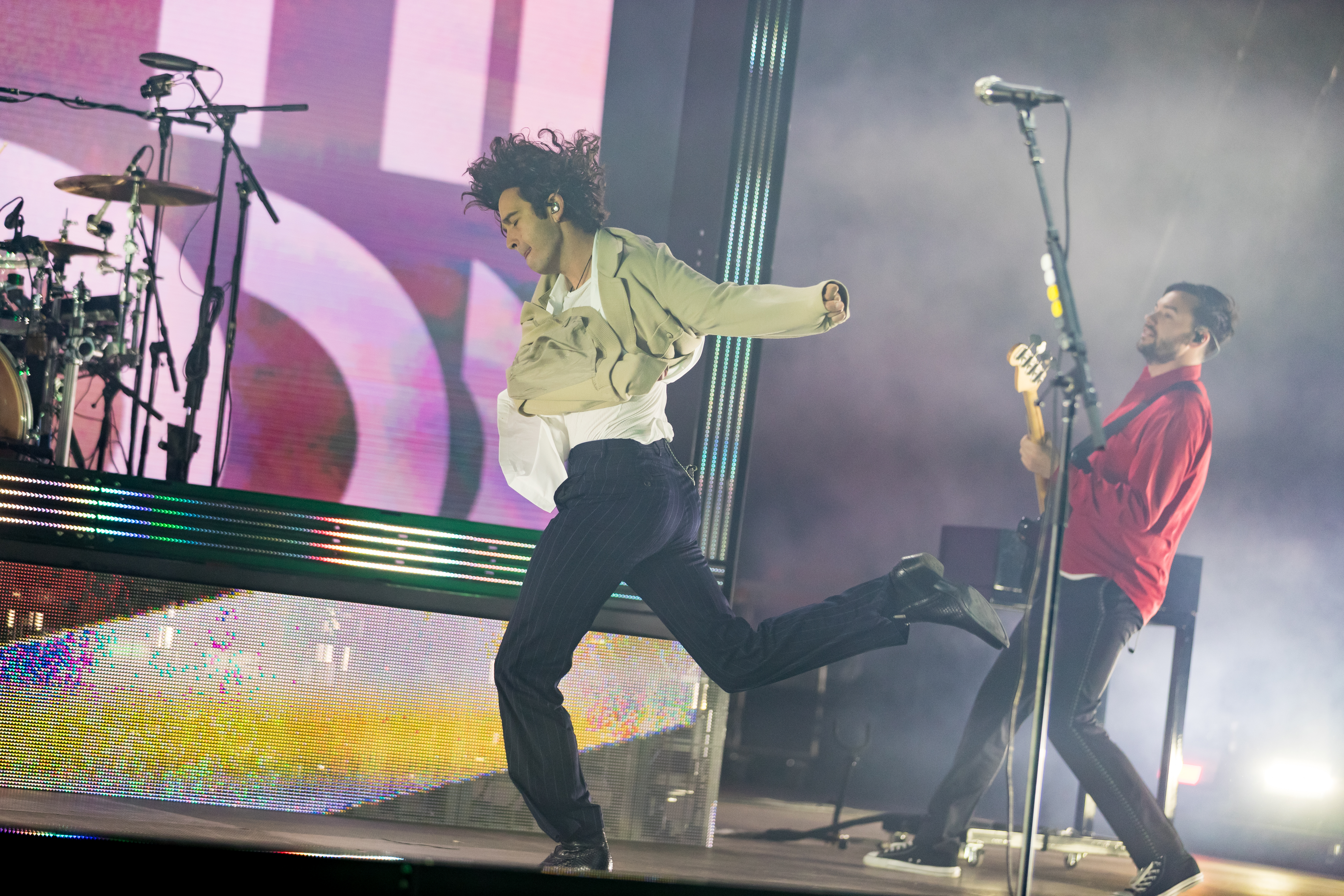
Healy and MacDonald performing in Germany in 2019

The band's work has been described broadly as pop-rock, art pop, alt-pop, synth-pop, new wave, and indie rock. NPR noted that Healy "has long treated writing songs for the 1975 as his diary". Per The Guardian, his lyrics distinguish the 1975's music from other artists'. He and Daniel are the principal songwriters of the band with Daniel describing himself as the "primary producer" and Healy as the "primary songwriter". He has described their relationship as "symbiotic": "We've got a shared musical vocabulary. Even if we're both working remotely, we're both working together."

Healy has referred to Talking Heads, My Bloody Valentine, Ride, and Michael Jackson as musical influences. Additionally, he has also stated that his greatest influence is the oeuvre of filmmaker John Hughes. Healy said that their influence is "heavily rooted" in African-American music in many interviews.

The 1975 is known for their artistic reinventions and musical eclecticism. Their debut album has been described as electropop, funk rock, indie pop, indie rock, pop, pop rock and rock. Scott Kerr of AllMusic wrote that the band combined "the dark and youthful themes of sex, love, and fear with ethereal alt-rock music." Dissentingly, veteran rock critic Robert Christgau argues that they should not be considered a "rock band" as they do not "rock".

For their second album, I Like It When You Sleep, for You Are So Beautiful yet So Unaware of It, Healy cited Christina Aguilera, D'Angelo, Roberta Flack, Boards of Canada, and Sigur Rós as inspirations saying that they're "a post-modern pop band that references a million things. I don't even know what my band is half the time."

== Legacy ==
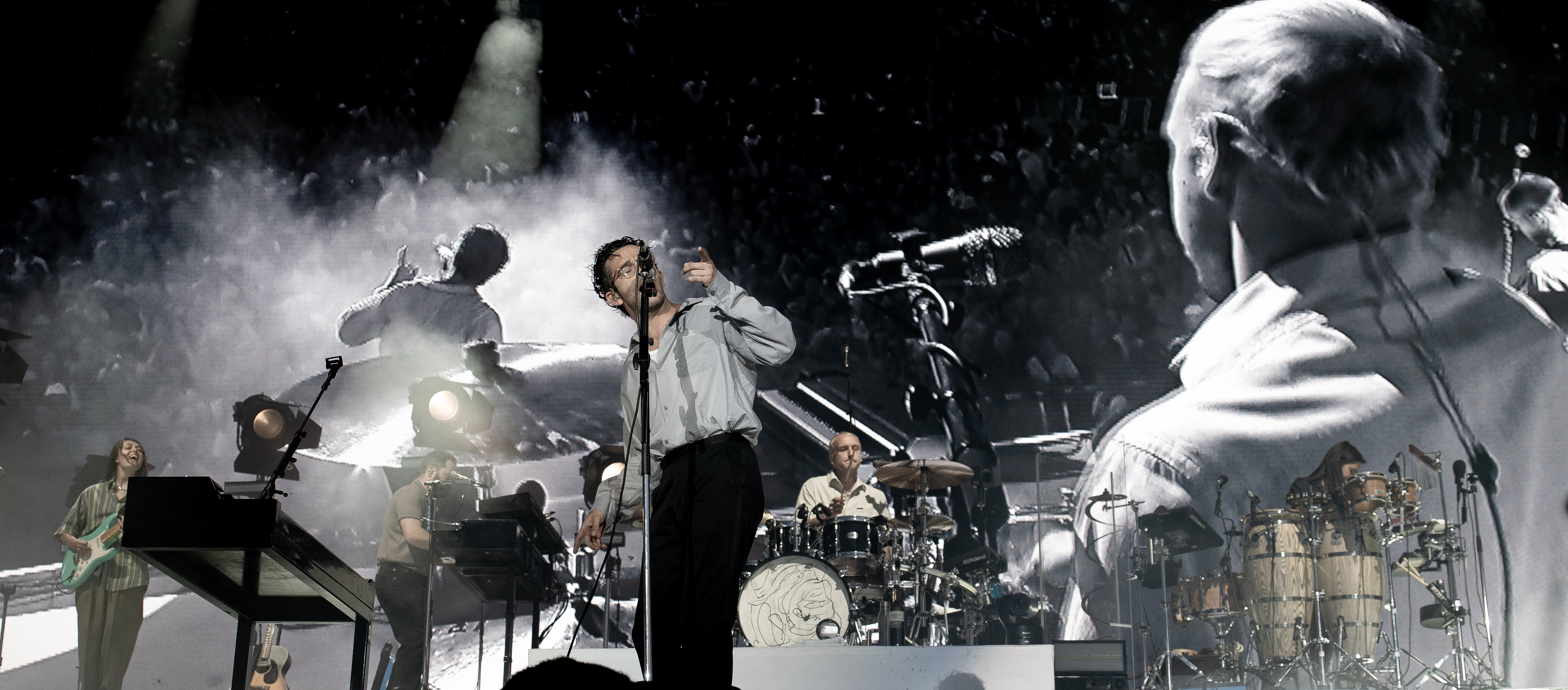
The band performing in Germany in 2023

Healy and the band has been described by several publications as "the voice of a generation". Rolling Stone stated that the band has been at "the forefront of modern pop rock" since their debut, with Billboard declaring them "the most ambitious pop-rock band of their generation". Pitchfork has described them as a "band of friends" who "ascended from scrappy emo rockers to global superstars". Entertainment Weekly has characterised them as "British Phenoms", NME proclaimed them as "Art Pop Heroes", and the BBC has called them "Modern Pop Icons".The Guardian has called them "Britain's Biggest Band" in 2020, The Daily Telegraph stated that they're "Britain's Hottest Band", and the Evening Standard proclaimed them the "Most Compelling Pop Band in the Planet" in 2023.

In 2022, Justin Hawkins of British hard-rock band The Darkness heavily praised the band upon hearing their 2022 single "Part of the Band" after being previously dismissive of them. Hawkins particularly cited the brutal honesty and self-analysis within the song to be moving, leading him to tears. Hawkins said in regards to the song; "I just love it when something hits me like that".

In 2025, English singer and songwriter Robbie Williams included the band's 2018 single "Love It If We Made It" in a playlist of various songs cited as influences for his 2026 album Britpop.

The 1975's influence in the indie pop scene has been termed "Healywave" by NME. Described as "deftly plucked, palm-muted guitar line, hop, skip and jumping its way across shimmering pop synth work and third-wave emo lyricism", The Big Issue added that it is a "dreamified take on Eighties pop-rock". "Healywave" acts named by the NME include Pale Waves, Fickle Friends, and the Aces among various others.

== Members ==
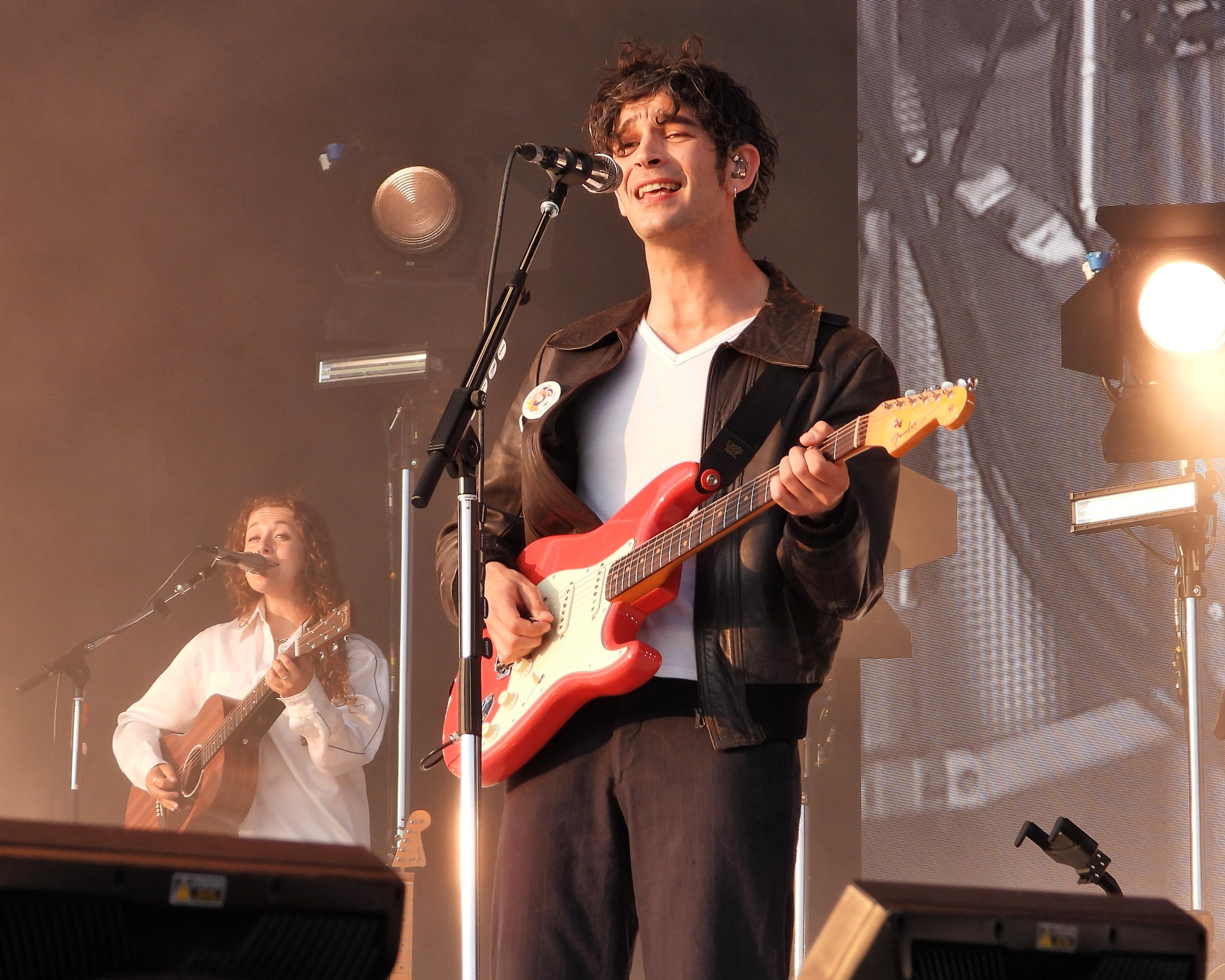
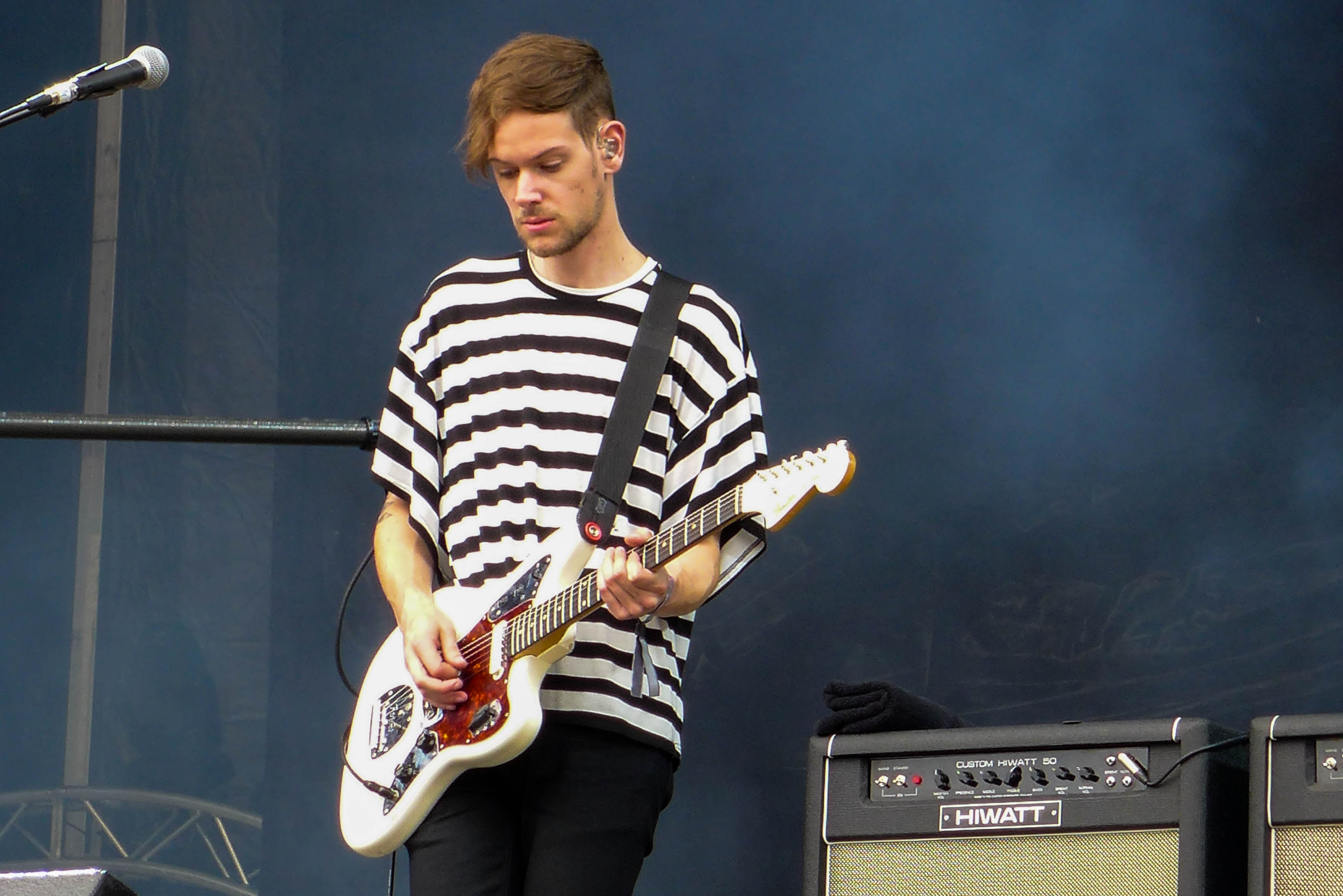
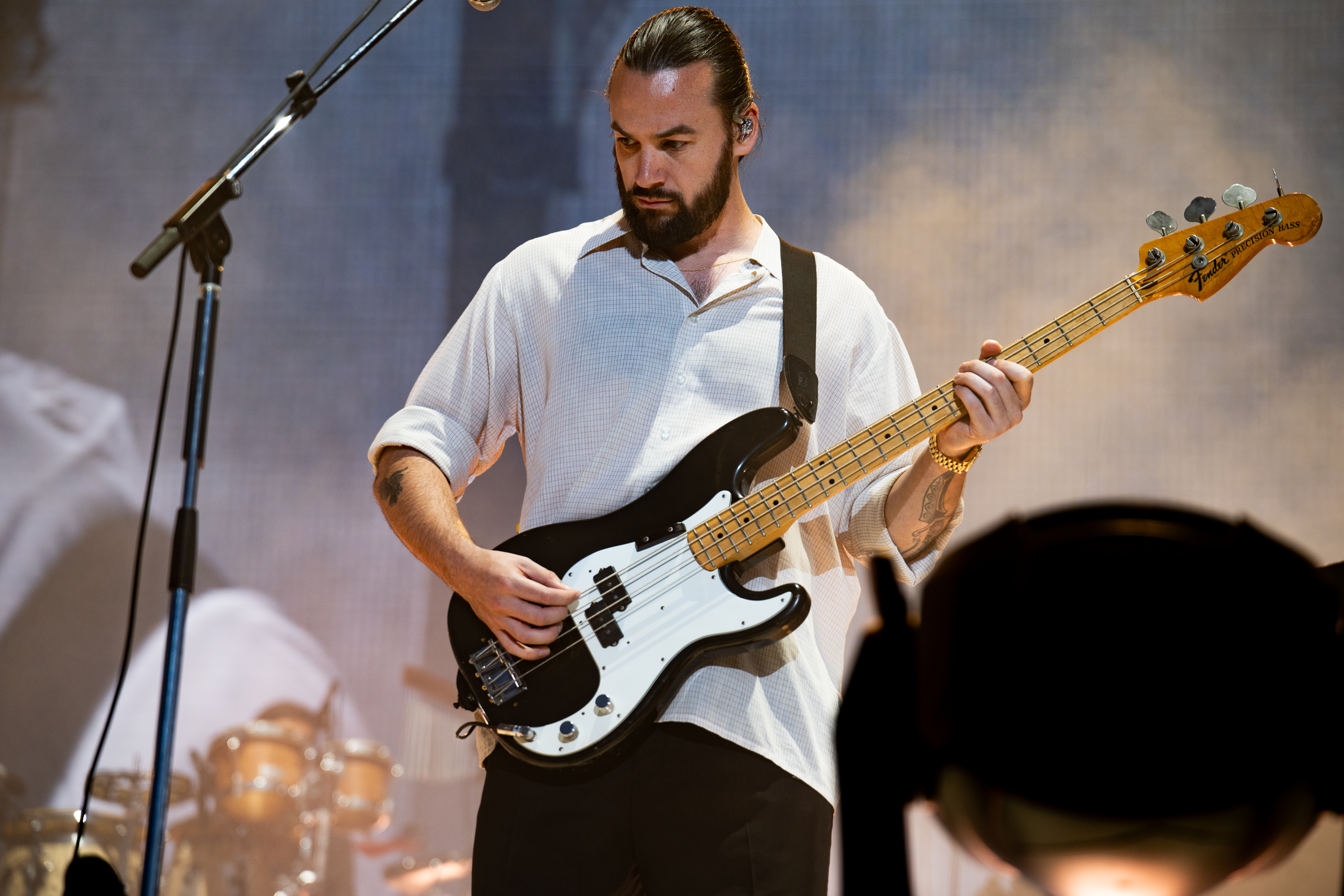
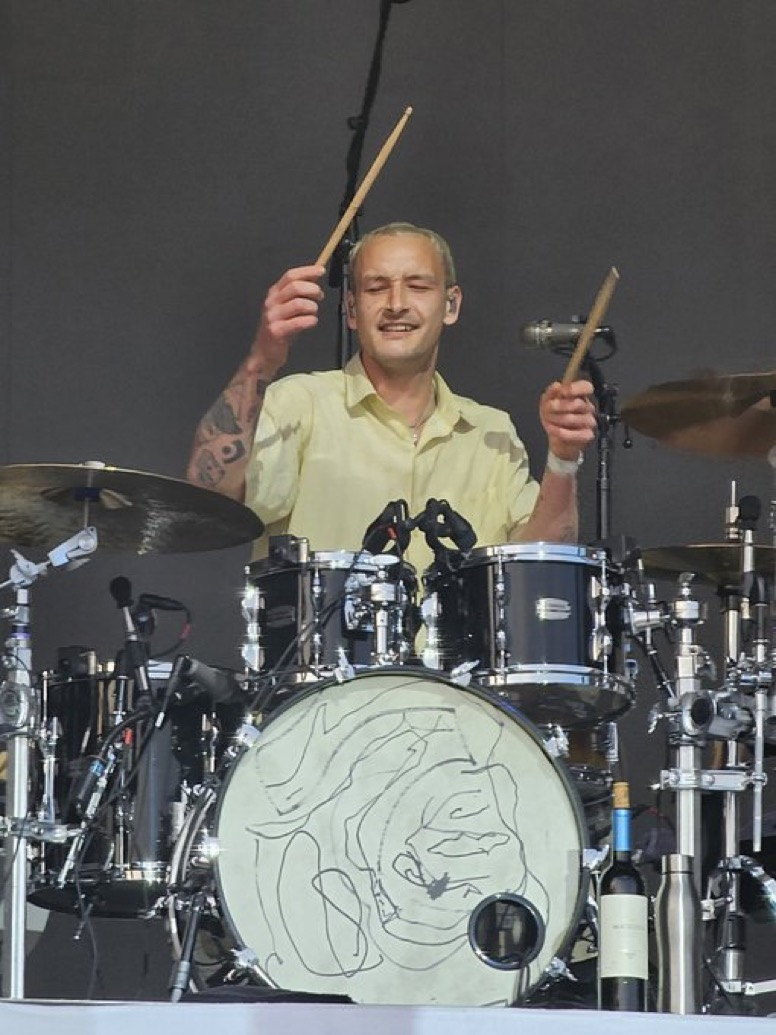
Healy, Hann, MacDonald, and Daniel formed the band that would become the 1975 while students at Wilmslow High School in 2002; they started professionally releasing music in 2012.

=== Current members ===
- Matty Healy – lead vocals, rhythm guitar, piano, keyboards
- Adam Hann – lead guitar, keyboards, backing vocals
- Ross MacDonald – bass, keyboards, backing vocals
- George Daniel – drums, programming, percussion, keyboards, backing vocals

=== Current touring musicians ===
- John Waugh – saxophone, keyboards, backing vocals (2013–present)
- Jamie Squire – keyboards, guitar, backing vocals, lap steel guitar (2015–present)
- Polly Money – rhythm guitar, keyboards, backing vocals (2022–present)
- Carly Holt-Hann – guest vocals (2022–present)
- Gabrielle Marie King – percussion, backing vocals (2023–present)

=== Former touring musicians ===
- Taitlyn Jaiy – backing vocals, dancer (2018–2020)
- Kaylee Jaiy – backing vocals, dancer (2018–2020)
- Rebekah Rayner – percussion (2022–2023)

== Discography ==
- The 1975 (2013)
- I Like It When You Sleep, for You Are So Beautiful yet So Unaware of It (2016)
- A Brief Inquiry into Online Relationships (2018)
- Notes on a Conditional Form (2020)
- Being Funny in a Foreign Language (2022)
- Dogs (TBA)

== Concert tours ==
- The 1975 Tour (2013–2015)
- I Like It When You Sleep Tour (2016–2017)
- Music for Cars Tour (2018–2020)
- At Their Very Best (2022–2023)
- Still... At Their Very Best (2023–2024)

== See also ==
- Songs by Matty Healy
