= List of songs by Matty Healy =

Songs by English singer-songwriter

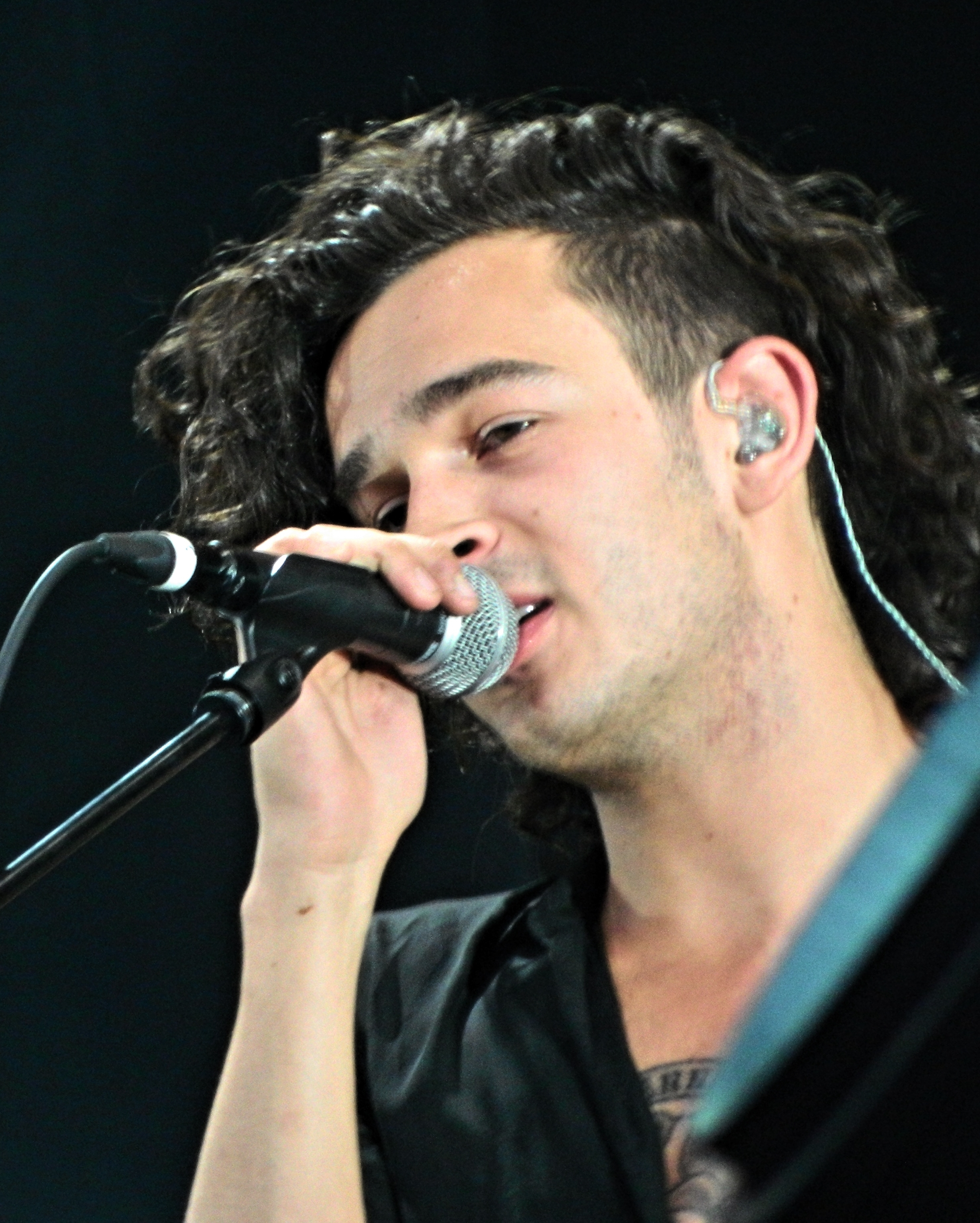
Matty Healy performing in France in 2014

English singer-songwriter Matty Healy has written and produced songs delving on themes like the millennial generation, masculinity, internet culture, social and political issues as well as his own life and relationships. His work has been praised throughout the music industry and the public, making him a recipient of four Brit Awards, and two Ivor Novello Awards including Songwriter of the Year. He has also been nominated twice for the Mercury Prize and Grammy Awards.

He has written, produced and performed tracks on all of the 1975's EPs — Facedown (2012), Sex (2012), Music for Cars (2013), IV (2013) — and studio albums — The 1975 (2013), I Like It When You Sleep, for You Are So Beautiful yet So Unaware of It (2016), A Brief Inquiry into Online Relationships (2018), Notes on a Conditional Form (2020), Being Funny in a Foreign Language (2022). Healy makes the 1975's music together with bandmate George Daniel. He works on the lyrics and melody, serving as primary songwriter and creative director, while Daniel serves as the primary producer who designs the sound. NPR noted that Healy "has long treated writing songs for the 1975 as his diary". He has also written and produced music for other artists.

The lyricism of Healy is known for its wit, humour, and self-awareness. His musical eclecticism is accompanied by lyrics that are "complex, clever, [and] catchy" streams of consciousness and tongue-twisters, in addition to being "topical, explicit, and relentlessly self-referential." Healy has been called by Consequence as "rock's poet laureate of heartbreak, growing up, and fucking up," with NME stating that he is "undoubtedly, one of this generation's finest wordsmiths." Rolling Stone stated that in the music world, Healy is the "spokesperson for the millennial generation", while The Telegraph called him "the millennial Jim Morrison" and "the Bob Dylan of raising your blood pressure". The New York Times described him as "one of the best contemporary writers — especially outside of rap — on the process of consumption, whether it's drugs or culture or goods".

== Released songs ==
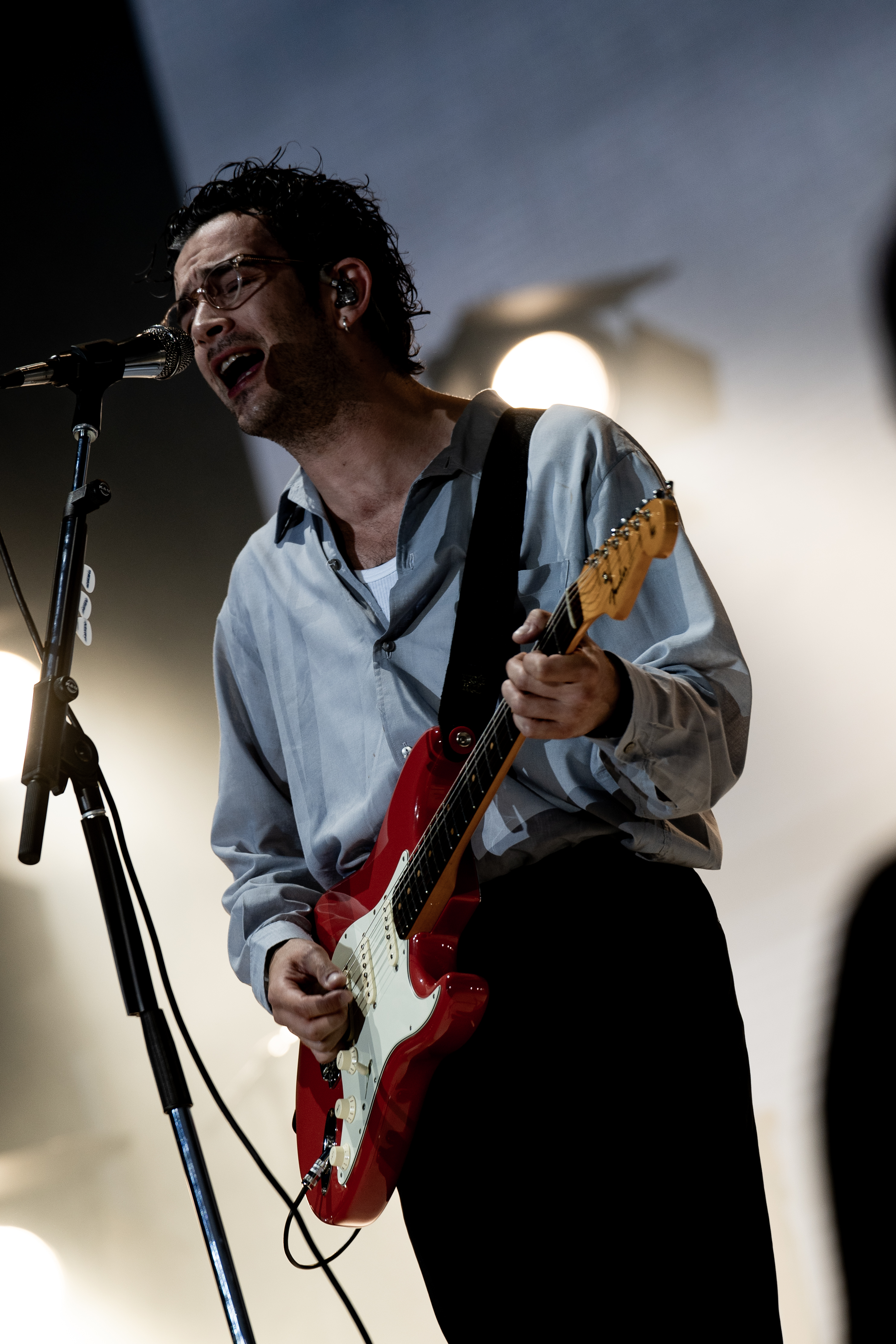
Healy has written all the tracks in the 1975's discography

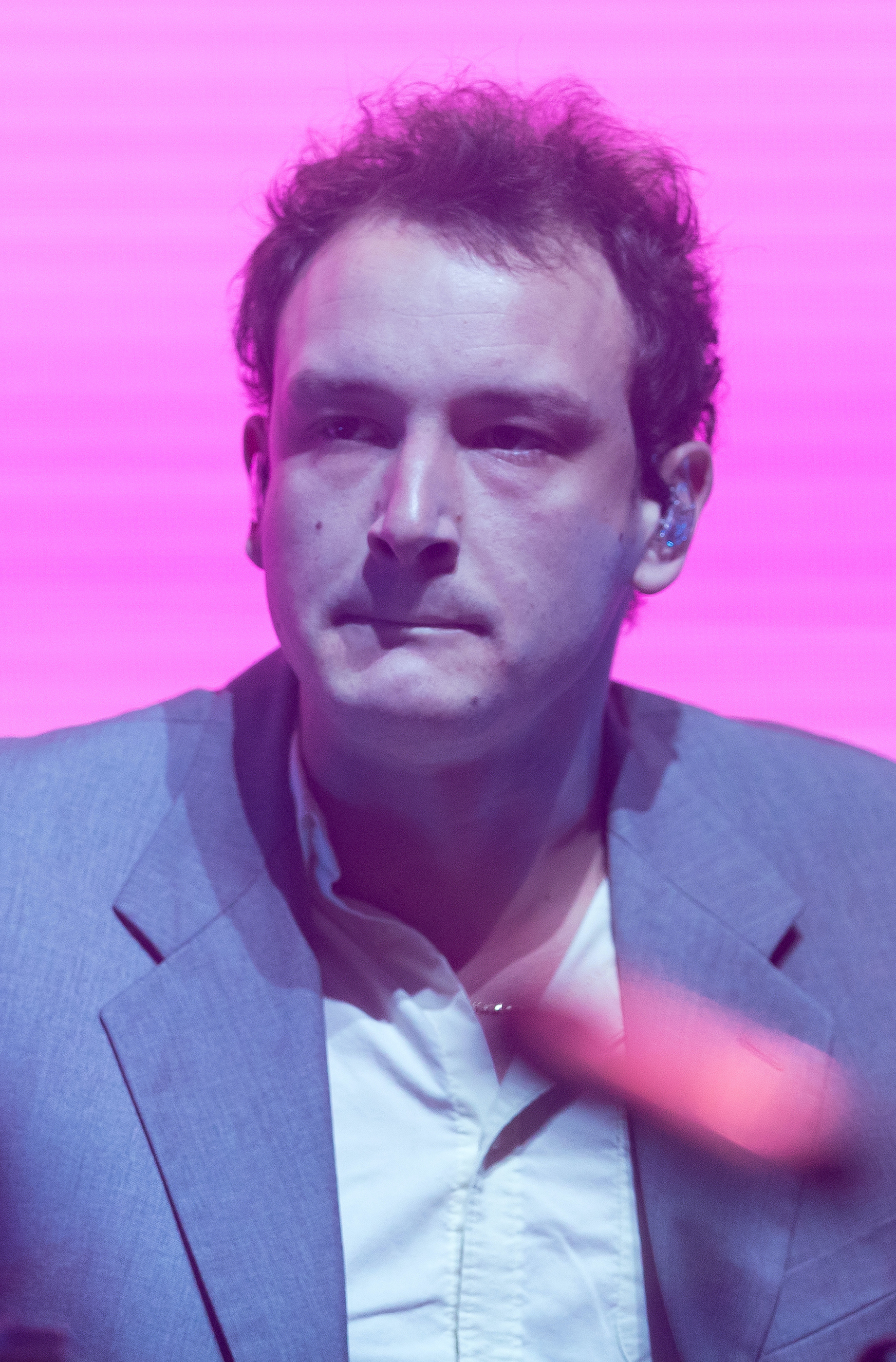
The 1975's drummer George Daniel is the primary producer of the band’s music while Healy is the principal songwriter

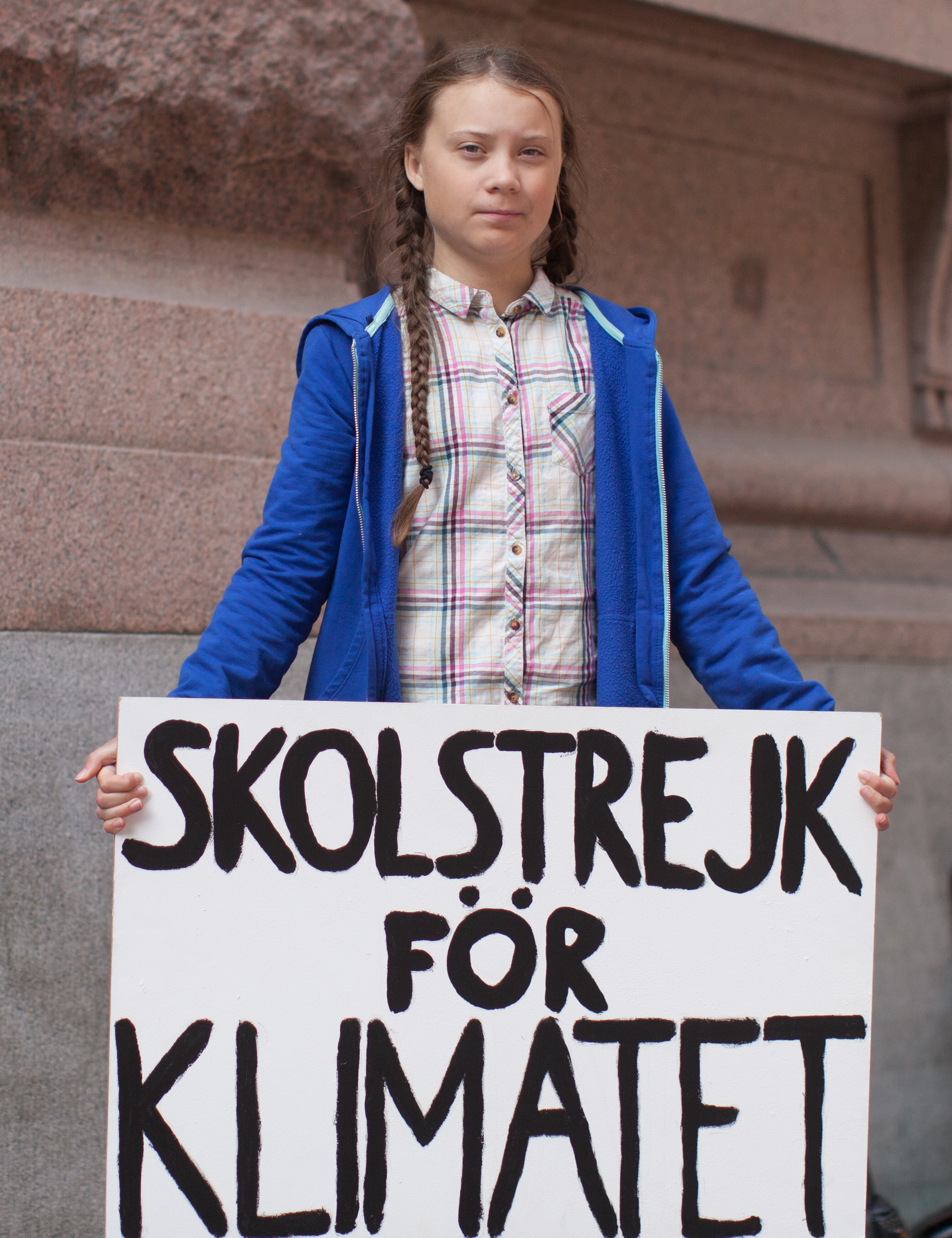
Climate activist Greta Thunberg has given a climate change speech on "The 1975" from Notes on a Conditional Form

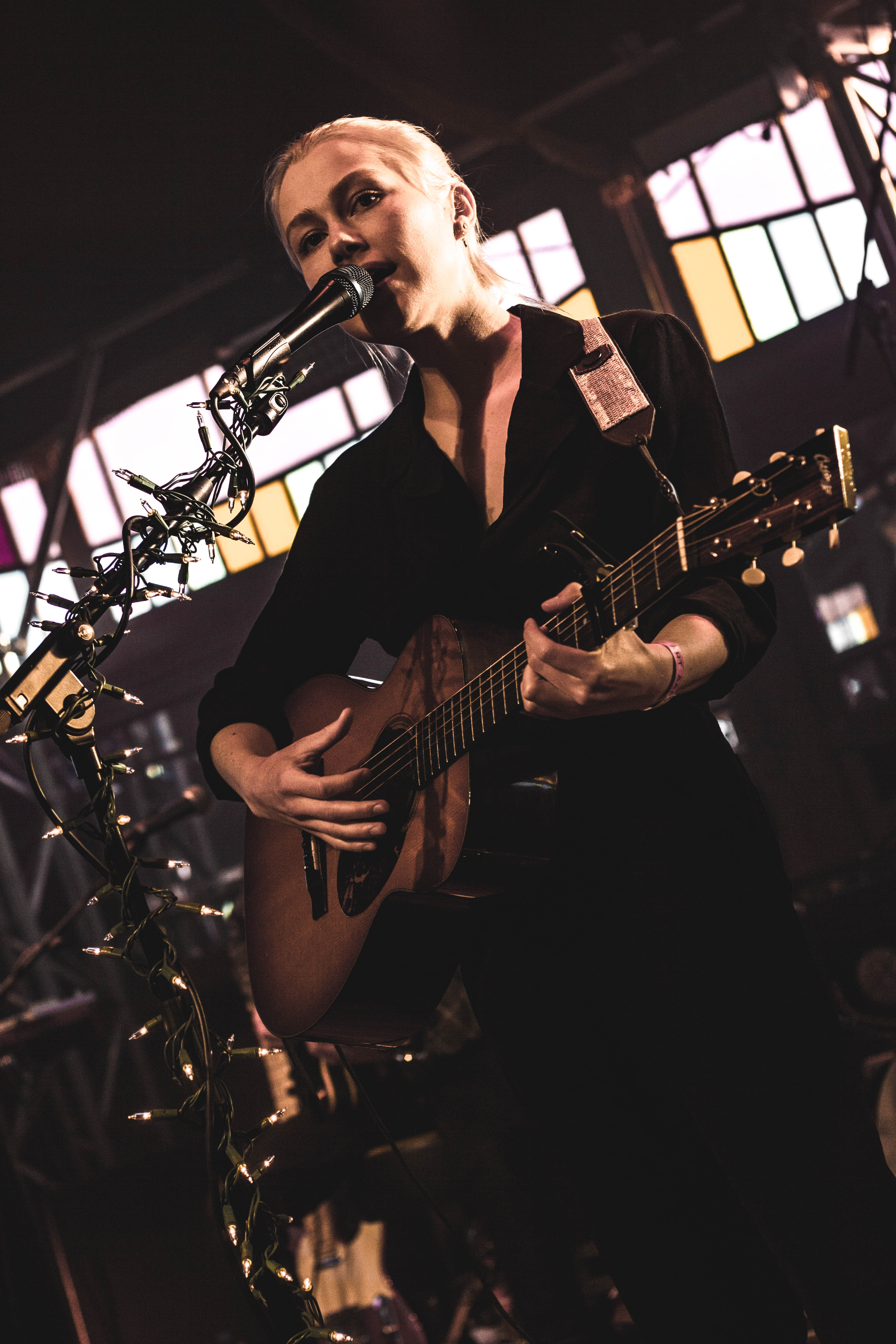
Contributing to four songs, Phoebe Bridgers is the most prominent collaborator on Notes on a Conditional Form (2022)

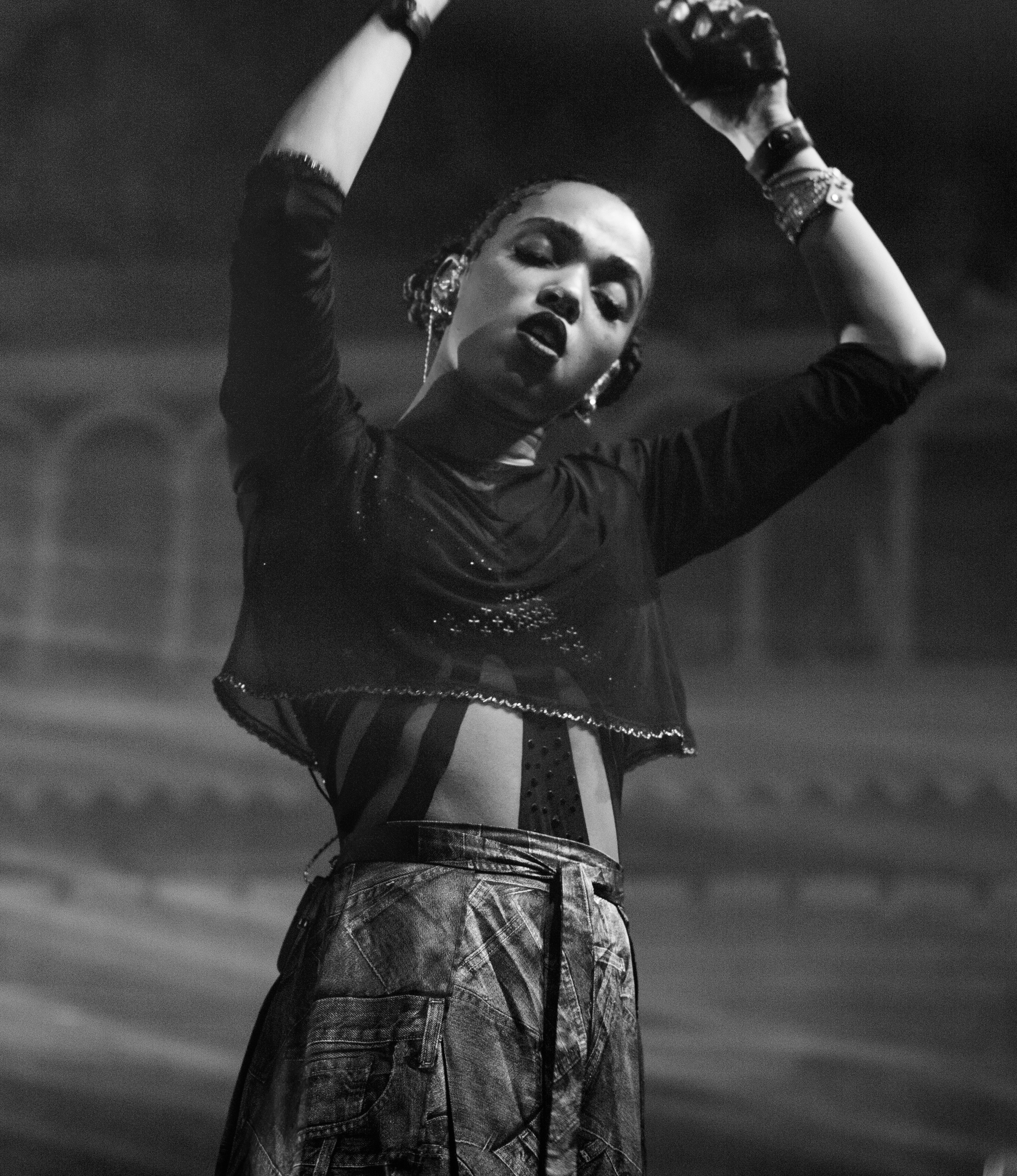
FKA Twigs lent her operatic vocals to "If You're Too Shy (Let Me Know)" and "What Should I Say"

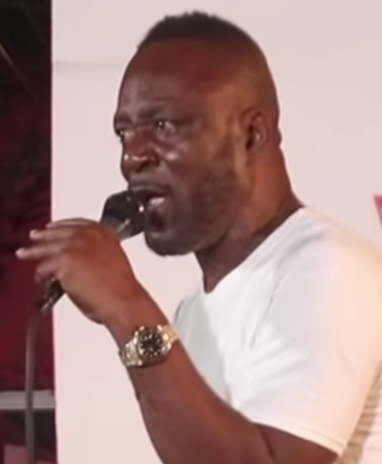
Cutty Ranks' vocals featured in "Shiny Collarbone" on Notes on a Conditional Form

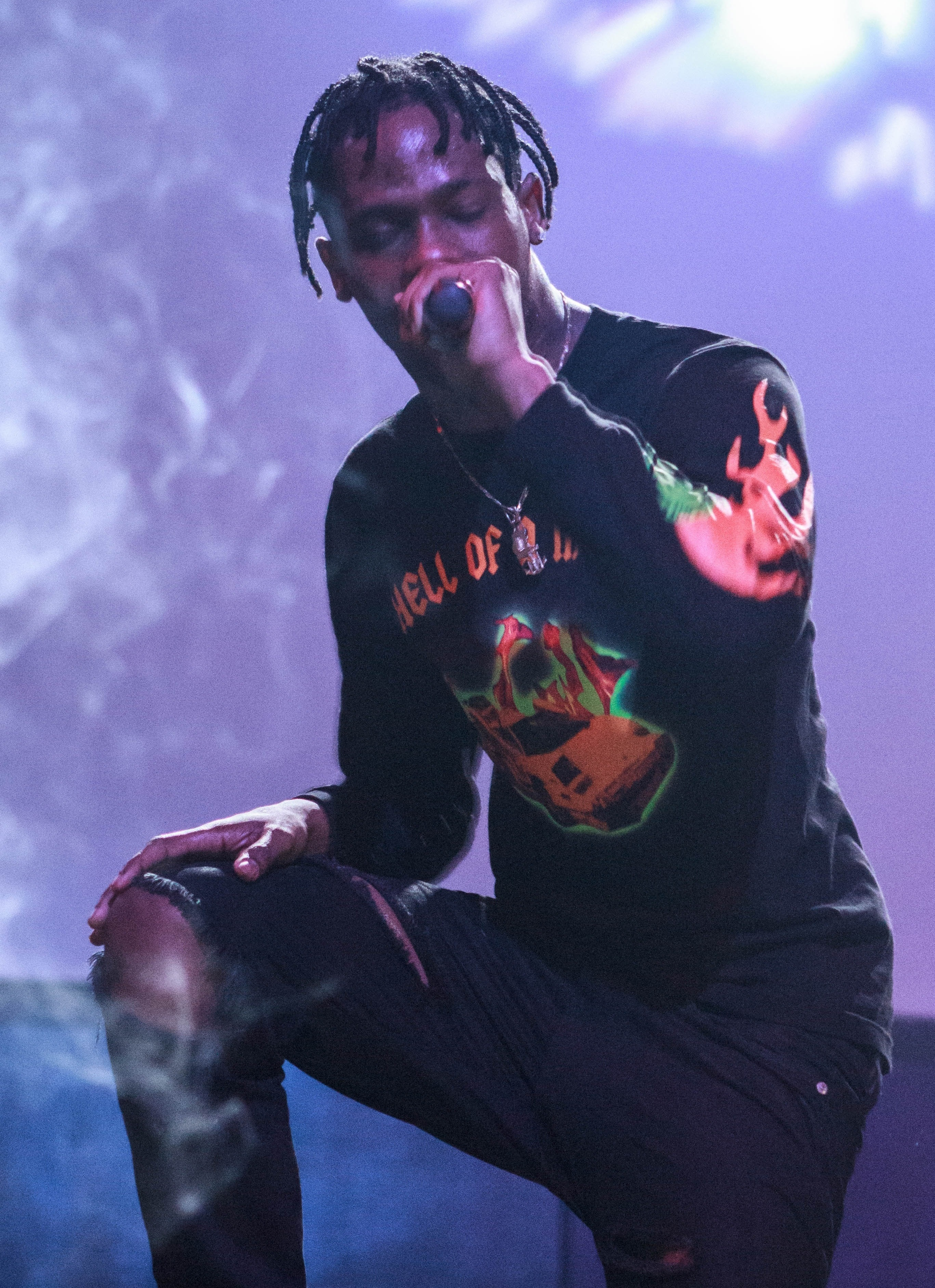
Healy featured in Travis Scott's "Don't Play"

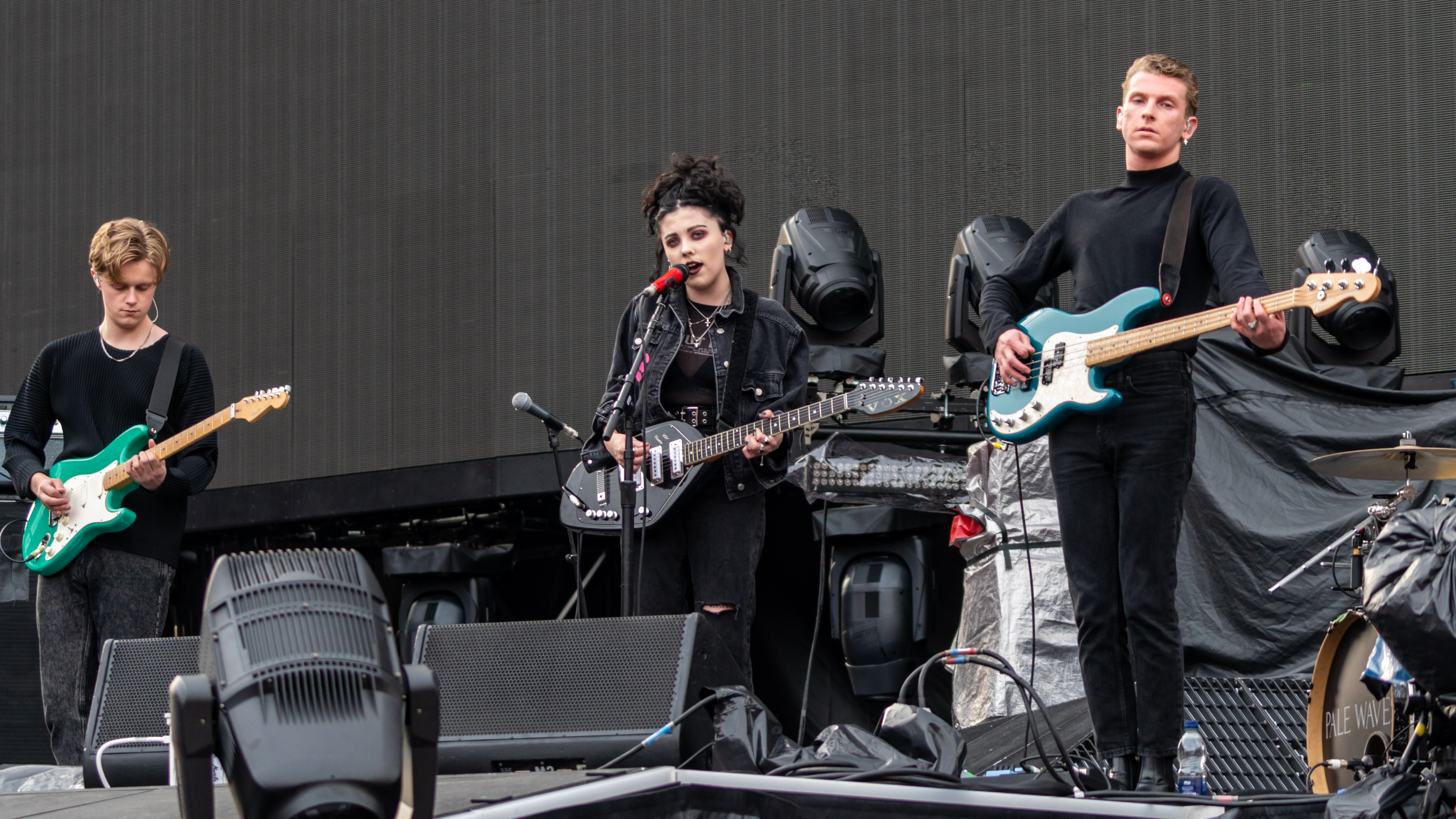
Healy has produced Pale Waves' second single "Television Romance" and directed its music video

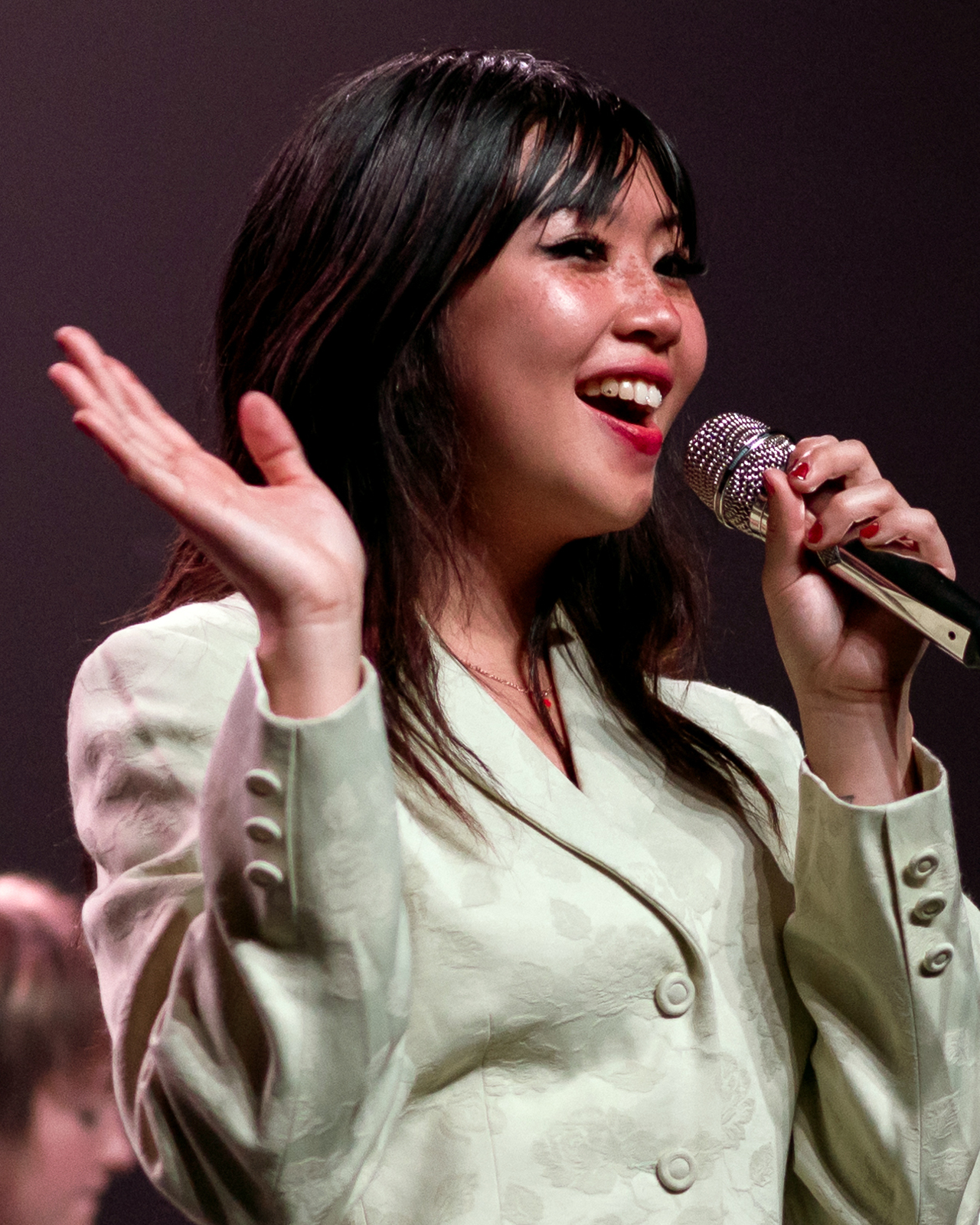
Healy has produced and written tracks for Beabadoobee's EP and second album.

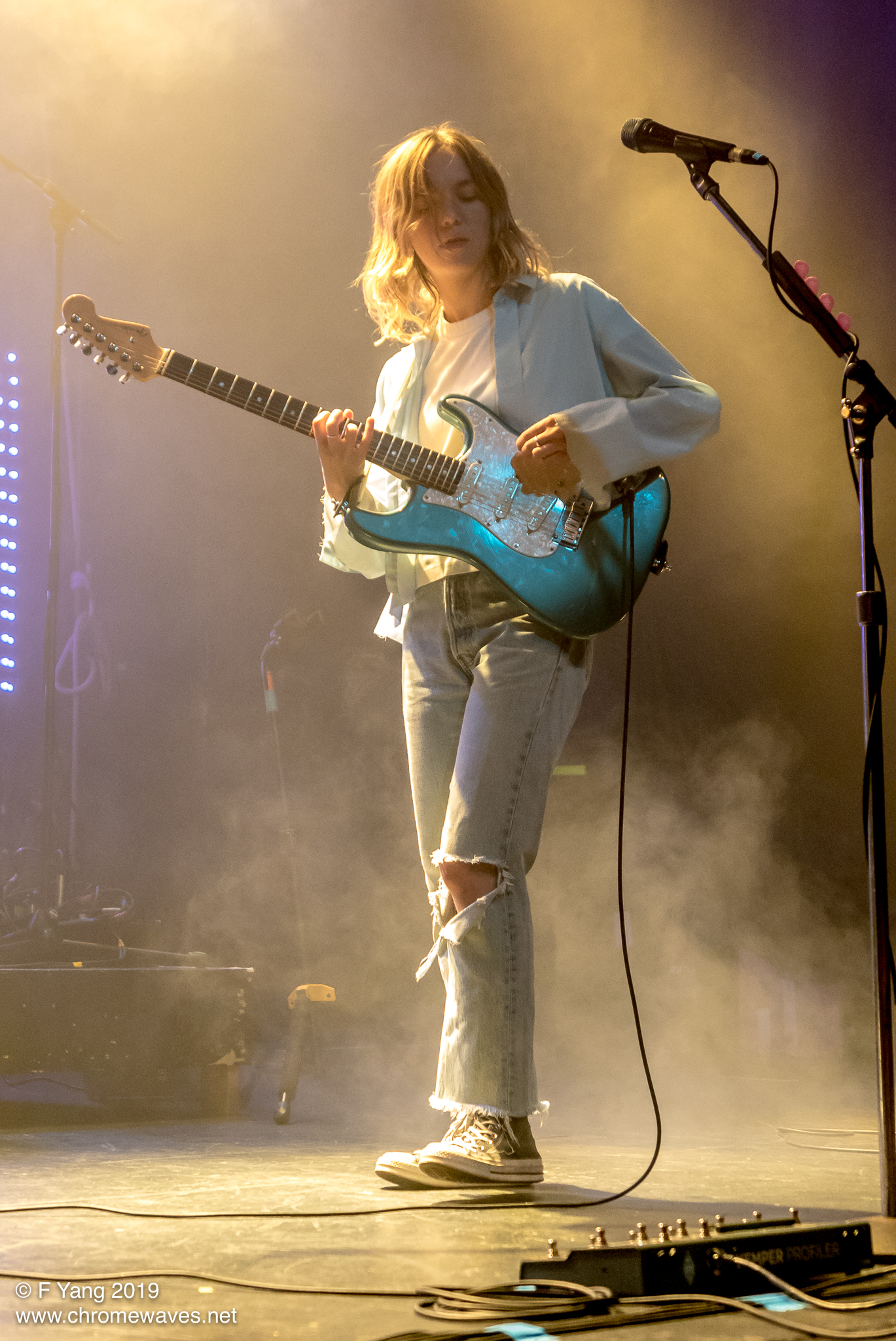
The Japanese House was introduced to Healy in 2012, and he has since produced her two EPs and collaborated on the song "Sunshine Baby"

Key
‡	Indicates song released as a single
†	Indicates song which Matty Healy served only as producer

Song	Artist(s)	Writer(s)	Album	Year	Ref.
"5 Ways to Bleach Your Hair" †	No Rome	Matthew Healy; George Daniel; No Rome	Crying In The Prettiest Places (EP)	2019	
"12"	The 1975	Matthew Healy; George Daniel; Ross MacDonald; Adam Hann	The 1975	2013	
"102"	The 1975	Matthew Healy; George Daniel; Ross MacDonald; Adam Hann	A Brief Inquiry into Online Relationships (Japanese Bonus Track)	2018	
"A Change of Heart" ‡	The 1975	Matthew Healy; George Daniel; Ross MacDonald; Adam Hann	I Like It When You Sleep, for You Are So Beautiful yet So Unaware of It	2016	
"About You" ‡	The 1975	Matthew Healy; George Daniel	Being Funny in a Foreign Language	2022	
"All I Need to Hear" ‡	The 1975	Matthew Healy; George Daniel; Jamie Squire	Being Funny in a Foreign Language	2022	
"All Up in My Head" †	No Rome	Matthew Healy; George Daniel; No Rome	Crying In The Prettiest Places (EP)	2019	
"An Encounter"	The 1975	Matthew Healy; George Daniel; Ross MacDonald; Adam Hann	The 1975	2013	
"Animal Noises" / "Thinking About U" †	Beabadoobee	Matthew Healy Beatrice Ilejay Laus; George Daniel	Our Extended Play (EP)	2021	
"Anobrain"	The 1975	Matthew Healy; George Daniel; Ross MacDonald; Adam Hann	Music for Cars (EP) and The 1975 (Deluxe Edition)	2012 and 2013	
"Antichrist"	The 1975	Matthew Healy; George Daniel; Ross MacDonald; Adam Hann	Facedown (EP) and The 1975 (Deluxe Edition)	2012 and 2013	
"Bagsy Not in Net"	The 1975	Matthew Healy; George Daniel; Ross MacDonald; Adam Hann	Notes on a Conditional Form	2020	
"Be My Mistake"	The 1975	Matthew Healy; George Daniel; Ross MacDonald; Adam Hann	A Brief Inquiry into Online Relationships	2018	
"By Your Side" (cover)	The 1975	Matthew Healy; George Daniel; Andrew Hale; Stuart Matthewman; Paul S. Denman		2017	
"Cashmoney" †	No Rome	Matthew Healy; George Daniel; No Rome	Crying In The Prettiest Places (EP)	2019	
"Chocolate"	The 1975	Matthew Healy; George Daniel; Ross MacDonald; Adam Hann	Music for Cars (EP) and The 1975 (Deluxe Edition)	2012 and 2013	
"Chocolate" (acoustic version)	The 1975	Matthew Healy; George Daniel; Ross MacDonald; Adam Hann	Sex (EP) and The 1975 (Deluxe Edition)	2012 and 2013	
"Chocolate" (Jonas LR remix)	The 1975	Matthew Healy; George Daniel; Ross MacDonald; Adam Hann	The 1975 (iTunes deluxe edition)	2013	
"Clean" †	The Japanese House	Matthew Healy; George Daniel; The Japanese House	Clean (EP)	2015	
"Cologne" †	Beabadoobee	Matthew Healy; George Daniel	Our Extended Play (EP)	2021	
"Cool Blue" †	The Japanese House	Matthew Healy; George Daniel; The Japanese House	Clean (EP)	2015	
"Do It Again" †	No Rome	Matthew Healy; George Daniel; No Rome	RIP Indo Hisashi (EP)	2018	
"Don't Play"	The 1975; Travis Scott; Big Sean	Matthew Healy; Jacques Webster; Allen Ritter; Anthony Kilhoffer; Anderson Hernandez; Big Sean; George Daniel; Ross MacDonald; Adam Hann	Days Before Rodeo	2014	
"Don't Worry"	The 1975	Matthew Healy; George Daniel; Tim Healy	Notes on a Conditional Form	2020	
"Facedown"	The 1975	Matthew Healy; George Daniel; Ross MacDonald; Adam Hann	Facedown (EP) and The 1975 (Deluxe Edition)	2012 and 2013	
"Fallingforyou"	The 1975	Matthew Healy; George Daniel; Ross MacDonald; Adam Hann	IV (EP)	2012 and 2013	
"Frail State of Mind" ‡	The 1975	Matthew Healy; George Daniel; Ross MacDonald; Adam Hann	Notes on a Conditional Form	2019	
"Girls" ‡	The 1975	Matthew Healy; George Daniel; Ross MacDonald; Adam Hann	The 1975	2013	
"Give Yourself a Try" ‡	The 1975	Matthew Healy; George Daniel; Ross MacDonald; Adam Hann	A Brief Inquiry into Online Relationships	2018	
"Guys" ‡	Matty Healy	Matthew Healy; George Daniel; Ross MacDonald; Adam Hann	Notes on a Conditional Form	2020	
"Happiness" ‡	The 1975	Matthew Healy; George Daniel; DJ Sabrina the Teenage DJ	Being Funny in a Foreign Language	2022	
"Having No Head"	The 1975	Matthew Healy; George Daniel; Ross MacDonald; Adam Hann	Notes on a Conditional Form	2020	
"Haunt // Bed"	The 1975	Matthew Healy; George Daniel; Ross MacDonald; Adam Hann	IV (EP)	2012 and 2013	
"Head.Cars.Bending"	The 1975	Matthew Healy; George Daniel; Ross MacDonald; Adam Hann	Music for Cars (EP) and The 1975 (Deluxe Edition)	2012 and 2013	
"Heart Out" ‡	The 1975	Matthew Healy; George Daniel; Ross MacDonald; Adam Hann	The 1975	2013	
"He Gets Me So High" †	Beabadoobee	Matthew Healy; George Daniel	Our Extended Play (EP)	2021	
"HNSCC"	The 1975	Matthew Healy	Music for Cars (EP) and The 1975 (Deluxe Edition)	2012 and 2013	
"How to Draw"	The 1975	Matthew Healy; George Daniel; Ross MacDonald; Adam Hann	I Like It When You Sleep, for You Are So Beautiful yet So Unaware of It	2016	
"How to Draw / Petrichor"	The 1975	Matthew Healy; George Daniel; Ross MacDonald; Adam Hann	A Brief Inquiry into Online Relationships	2018	
"Human Too"	The 1975	Matthew Healy; George Daniel; Jamie Squire; Benjamin Francis Leftwich; Jimmy Hogarth	Being Funny in a Foreign Language	2022	
"I Always Wanna Die (Sometimes)"	The 1975	Matthew Healy; George Daniel; Ross MacDonald; Adam Hann	A Brief Inquiry into Online Relationships	2018	
"I Couldn't Be More in Love"	The 1975	Matthew Healy; George Daniel; Ross MacDonald; Adam Hann	A Brief Inquiry into Online Relationships	2018	
"If I Believe You"	The 1975	Matthew Healy; George Daniel; Ross MacDonald; Adam Hann	I Like It When You Sleep, for You Are So Beautiful yet So Unaware of It	2016	
"If You're Too Shy (Let Me Know)" ‡	The 1975	Matthew Healy; George Daniel; Ross MacDonald; Adam Hann	Notes on a Conditional Form	2020	
"I Like America & America Likes Me"	The 1975	Matthew Healy; George Daniel; Ross MacDonald; Adam Hann	A Brief Inquiry into Online Relationships	2018	
"I Like It When You Sleep, for You Are So Beautiful yet So Unaware of It"	The 1975	Matthew Healy; George Daniel; Ross MacDonald; Adam Hann	I Like It When You Sleep, for You Are So Beautiful yet So Unaware of It	2016	
"I Might Say Something Stupid"	Charli XCX ft. The 1975 & Jon Hopkins	Charli XCX; Gesaffelstein; Matthew Healy; George Daniel; Jon Hopkins	Brat and It's Completely Different but Also Still Brat	2024	
"I'm in Love with You" ‡	The 1975	Matthew Healy; George Daniel; Adam Hann	Being Funny in a Foreign Language	2022	
"Intro/Set3"	The 1975	Matthew Healy; George Daniel; Ross MacDonald; Adam Hann	Sex (EP) and The 1975 (Deluxe Edition)	2012 and 2013	
"Inside Your Mind"	The 1975	Matthew Healy; George Daniel; Ross MacDonald; Adam Hann	A Brief Inquiry into Online Relationships	2018	
"Is There Somebody Who Can Watch You"	The 1975	Matthew Healy; George Daniel; Ross MacDonald; Adam Hann	The 1975	2013	
"Is There Somebody Who Can Watch You (Dream Koala Remix)"	The 1975; Dream Koala	Matthew Healy; George Daniel; Ross MacDonald; Adam Hann	Sex (EP)	2012	
"It's Not Living (If It's Not with You)" ‡	The 1975	Matthew Healy; George Daniel; Ross MacDonald; Adam Hann	A Brief Inquiry into Online Relationships	2018	
"I Think There's Something You Should Know"	The 1975	Matthew Healy; George Daniel; Ross MacDonald; Adam Hann	Notes on a Conditional Form	2020	
"Jesus Christ 2005 God Bless America" ‡	The 1975; Phoebe Bridgers	Matthew Healy; George Daniel; Ross MacDonald; Adam Hann	Notes on a Conditional Form	2020	
"Last Day on Earth" †	Beabadoobee	Matthew Healy; George Daniel	Our Extended Play (EP)	2021	
"Letter by the Water" †	The Japanese House	Matthew Healy; George Daniel; The Japanese House	Clean (EP)	2015	
"Looking for Somebody (To Love)"	The 1975	Matthew Healy; George Daniel; Ilsey Juber	Being Funny in a Foreign Language	2022	
"Lostmyhead"	The 1975	Matthew Healy; George Daniel; Ross MacDonald; Adam Hann	I Like It When You Sleep, for You Are So Beautiful yet So Unaware of It	2016	
"Love It If We Made It" ‡	The 1975	Matthew Healy; George Daniel; Ross MacDonald; Adam Hann	A Brief Inquiry into Online Relationships	2018	
"Love Me" ‡	The 1975	Matthew Healy; George Daniel; Ross MacDonald; Adam Hann	I Like It When You Sleep, for You Are So Beautiful yet So Unaware of It	2016	
"Loving Someone" ‡	The 1975	Matthew Healy; George Daniel; Ross MacDonald; Adam Hann	I Like It When You Sleep, for You Are So Beautiful yet So Unaware of It	2016	
"Me"	The 1975	Matthew Healy; George Daniel; Ross MacDonald; Adam Hann	Music for Cars (EP) and The 1975 (Deluxe Edition)	2012 and 2013	
"Medicine"	The 1975	Matthew Healy; George Daniel		2014	
"Menswear"	The 1975	Matthew Healy; George Daniel; Ross MacDonald; Adam Hann	The 1975	2013	
"Me & You Together Song" ‡	The 1975	Matthew Healy; George Daniel; Ross MacDonald; Adam Hann	Notes on a Conditional Form	2020	
"Milk"	The 1975	Matthew Healy; George Daniel; Ross MacDonald; Adam Hann	Sex (EP) and The 1975 (Deluxe Edition)	2012 and 2013	
"Mine"	The 1975	Matthew Healy; George Daniel; Ross MacDonald; Adam Hann	A Brief Inquiry into Online Relationships	2018	
"M.O.N.E.Y."	The 1975	Matthew Healy; George Daniel; Ross MacDonald; Adam Hann	The 1975	2013	
"M.O.N.E.Y." (Mike Skinner remix)	The 1975; Mike Skinner	Matthew Healy; George Daniel; Ross MacDonald; Adam Hann	The 1975 (iTunes deluxe edition)	2013	
"Nana"	The 1975	Matthew Healy; George Daniel; Ross MacDonald; Adam Hann	I Like It When You Sleep, for You Are So Beautiful yet So Unaware of It	2016	
"Narcissist"	The 1975; No Rome	Matthew Healy; George Daniel; No Rome	RIP Indo Hisashi (EP)	2018	
"Nothing Revealed / Everything Denied"	The 1975	Matthew Healy; George Daniel; Ross MacDonald; Adam Hann	Notes on a Conditional Form	2020	
"Oh Caroline" ‡	The 1975	Matthew Healy; George Daniel; Ilsey Juber; Jamie Squire; Benjamin Francis Leftwich Jimmy Hogarth	Being Funny in a Foreign Language	2022	
"Part of the Band" ‡	The 1975	Matthew Healy; George Daniel; Jamie Squire	Being Funny in a Foreign Language	2022	
"Paris"	The 1975	Matthew Healy; George Daniel; Ross MacDonald; Adam Hann	I Like It When You Sleep, for You Are So Beautiful yet So Unaware of It	2016	
"People" ‡	The 1975	Matthew Healy; George Daniel; Ross MacDonald; Adam Hann	Notes on a Conditional Form	2019	
"Pictures of Us"	Beabadoobee	Matthew Healy; Beatrice Ilejay Laus; Jacob Bugden	Beatopia	2022	
"Pink" †	No Rome	Matthew Healy; George Daniel; No Rome	Crying In The Prettiest Places (EP)	2019	
"Playing on My Mind"	The 1975	Matthew Healy; George Daniel; Ross MacDonald; Adam Hann	Notes on a Conditional Form	2020	
"Please Be Naked"	The 1975	Matthew Healy; George Daniel; Ross MacDonald; Adam Hann	I Like It When You Sleep, for You Are So Beautiful yet So Unaware of It	2016	
"Please Don't Leave Just Yet"	Holly Humberstone	Holly Ffion Humberstone; Rob Milton; Matthew Healy	The Walls Are Way Too Thin	2021	
"Pools to Bathe In" †	The Japanese House	Matthew Healy; George Daniel; The Japanese House	Pools to Bathe In (EP)	2015	
"Pressure"	The 1975	Matthew Healy; George Daniel; Ross MacDonald; Adam Hann	The 1975	2013	
"Pressure" (Artful Dodger remix)	The 1975; Artful Dodger	Matthew Healy; George Daniel; Ross MacDonald; Adam Hann	The 1975 (iTunes deluxe edition)	2013	
"Rimbaud, Come and Sit for a While" †	No Rome	Matthew Healy; George Daniel; No Rome	Crying In The Prettiest Places (EP)	2019	
"Robbers" ‡	The 1975	Matthew Healy; George Daniel; Ross MacDonald; Adam Hann	The 1975	2013	
"Roadkill"	The 1975	Matthew Healy; George Daniel; Ross MacDonald; Adam Hann	Notes on a Conditional Form	2020	
"Saint Laurent" †	No Rome	Matthew Healy; George Daniel; No Rome	RIP Indo Hisashi (EP)	2018	
"Settle Down" ‡	The 1975	Matthew Healy; George Daniel; Ross MacDonald; Adam Hann	The 1975	2013	
"Settle Down" (Dan Lissvik remix)	The 1975; Dan Lissvik	Matthew Healy; George Daniel; Ross MacDonald; Adam Hann	The 1975 (iTunes deluxe edition)	2013	
"Sex" ‡	The 1975	Matthew Healy; George Daniel; Ross MacDonald; Adam Hann	Sex (EP) and The 1975 (Deluxe Edition)	2012 and 2013	
"Sex" (acoustic version)	The 1975	Matthew Healy; George Daniel; Ross MacDonald; Adam Hann	Sex (EP) and The 1975 (Deluxe Edition)	2012 and 2013	
"Seventeen" †	No Rome	Matthew Healy; George Daniel No Rome	RIP Indo Hisashi (EP)	2018	
"Sister" †	The Japanese House	Matthew Healy; George Daniel; The Japanese House	Pools to Bathe In (EP)	2015	
"She Lays Down"	The 1975	Matthew Healy; George Daniel; Ross MacDonald; Adam Hann	I Like It When You Sleep, for You Are So Beautiful yet So Unaware of It	2016	
"She's American" ‡	The 1975	Matthew Healy; George Daniel; Ross MacDonald; Adam Hann	I Like It When You Sleep, for You Are So Beautiful yet So Unaware of It	2016	
"She Way Out"	The 1975	Matthew Healy; George Daniel; Ross MacDonald; Adam Hann	The 1975	2013	
"She Way Out" (Cid Rim remix)	Matty Healy; Cid Rim	Matthew Healy; George Daniel; Ross MacDonald; Adam Hann	The 1975 (iTunes deluxe edition)	2013	
"Shiny Collarbone"	The 1975	Matthew Healy; George Daniel; Ross MacDonald; Adam Hann	Notes on a Conditional Form	2020	
"So Far (It's Alright)"	The 1975	Matthew Healy; George Daniel; Ross MacDonald; Adam Hann	IV (EP)	2012 and 2013	
"Somebody Else" ‡	The 1975	Matthew Healy; George Daniel; Ross MacDonald; Adam Hann	I Like It When You Sleep, for You Are So Beautiful yet So Unaware of It	2016	
"Sincerity Is Scary" ‡	The 1975	Matthew Healy; George Daniel; Ross MacDonald; Adam Hann	A Brief Inquiry into Online Relationships	2018	
"Sleep Tight"	Holly Humberstone	Holly Ffion Humberstone; Rob Milton; Matthew Healy		2022	
"Somebody You Found" †	The Japanese House	Matthew Healy; George Daniel; The Japanese House	Saw You In A Dream (EP)	2017	
"Spinning"	Matty Healy; No Rome; Charli XCX	Matthew Healy; Andrew Wyatt; Charli XCX; No Rome; George Daniel		2021	
"Still" †	The Japanese House	Matthew Healy; George Daniel; The Japanese House	Pools to Bathe In (EP)	2015	
"Streaming"	The 1975	Matthew Healy; George Daniel; Ross MacDonald; Adam Hann	Notes on a Conditional Form	2020	
"Stoned in the Valley" †	No Rome	Matthew Healy; George Daniel; No Rome	Crying In The Prettiest Places (EP)	2019	
"Sugar Pill" †	The Japanese House	Matthew Healy; George Daniel; The Japanese House	Clean (EP)	2015	
"Sunshine Baby" ‡	Matty Healy; The Japanese House	George Daniel; The Japanese House; Chloe Kramer	In the End It Always Does	2022	
"Surrounded by Heads and Bodies"	The 1975	Matthew Healy; George Daniel; Ross MacDonald; Adam Hann	A Brief Inquiry into Online Relationships	2018	
"Talk!"	The 1975	Matthew Healy; George Daniel; Ross MacDonald; Adam Hann	The 1975	2013	
"Talk!" (Hackman remix)	The 1975; Hackman	Matthew Healy; George Daniel; Ross MacDonald; Adam Hann	The 1975 (iTunes deluxe edition)	2013	
"Television Romance" †	Pale Waves	Matthew Healy; George Daniel; Ciara Doran; Heather Baron-Gracie	My Mind Makes Noises	2018	
"The City"	The 1975	Matthew Healy; George Daniel; Ross MacDonald; Adam Hann	Facedown (EP) and The 1975 (Deluxe Edition)	2012 and 2013	
"Teeth" †	The Japanese House	Matthew Healy; George Daniel; The Japanese House	Pools to Bathe In (EP)	2015	
"The 1975" (2013)	The 1975	Matthew Healy; George Daniel; Ross MacDonald; Adam Hann	The 1975	2013	
"The 1975" (2016)	The 1975	Matthew Healy; George Daniel; Ross MacDonald; Adam Hann	I Like It When You Sleep, for You Are So Beautiful yet So Unaware of It	2016	
"The 1975" (2018)	The 1975	Matthew Healy; George Daniel; Ross MacDonald; Adam Hann	A Brief Inquiry into Online Relationships	2018	
"The 1975" (2020)	The 1975; Greta Thunberg	Matthew Healy; George Daniel; Greta Thunberg	Notes on a Conditional Form	2020	
"The 1975" (2022)	The 1975	Matthew Healy; George Daniel; BJ Burton; Tommy King	Being Funny in a Foreign Language	2022	
"The Ballad of Me and My Brain"	The 1975	Matthew Healy; George Daniel; Ross MacDonald; Adam Hann	I Like It When You Sleep, for You Are So Beautiful yet So Unaware of It	2016	
"The Birthday Party" ‡	The 1975	Matthew Healy; George Daniel; Ross MacDonald; Adam Hann	Notes on a Conditional Form	2020	
"The End (Music for Cars)"	The 1975	Matthew Healy; George Daniel; Ross MacDonald; Adam Hann	Notes on a Conditional Form	2020	
"The Sound" ‡	The 1975	Matthew Healy; George Daniel; Ross MacDonald; Adam Hann	I Like It When You Sleep, for You Are So Beautiful yet So Unaware of It	2016	
"The Man Who Married a Robot / Love Theme"	The 1975	Matthew Healy; George Daniel; Ross MacDonald; Adam Hann	A Brief Inquiry into Online Relationships	2018	
"Then Because She Goes"	The 1975	Matthew Healy; George Daniel; Ross MacDonald; Adam Hann	Notes on a Conditional Form	2020	
"There's a Honey" † ‡	Pale Waves	Matthew Healy; George Daniel; Ciara Doran; Heather Baron-Gracie	My Mind Makes Noises	2018	
"This Must Be My Dream"	The 1975	Matthew Healy; George Daniel; Ross MacDonald; Adam Hann	I Like It When You Sleep, for You Are So Beautiful yet So Unaware of It	2016	
"Tonight (I Wish I Was Your Boy)"	The 1975	Matthew Healy; George Daniel; Ross MacDonald; No Rome; Hiroshi Sato	Notes on a Conditional Form	2020	
"TooTimeTooTimeTooTime" ‡	The 1975	Matthew Healy; George Daniel; No Rome	A Brief Inquiry into Online Relationships	2018	
"Ugh!" ‡	The 1975	Matthew Healy; George Daniel; Ross MacDonald; Adam Hann	I Like It When You Sleep, for You Are So Beautiful yet So Unaware of It	2016	
"Undo"	The 1975	Matthew Healy; George Daniel; Ross MacDonald; Adam Hann	Sex (EP) and The 1975 (Deluxe Edition)	2012 and 2013	
"What Should I Say"	The 1975	Matthew Healy; George Daniel; Ross MacDonald; Adam Hann	Notes on a Conditional Form	2020	
"When We Are Together"	The 1975	Matthew Healy; George Daniel; Rob Milton	Being Funny in a Foreign Language	2022	
"Wintering"	The 1975	Matthew Healy; George Daniel; Jacob Bugden	Being Funny in a Foreign Language	2022	
"Woman"	The 1975	Matthew Healy; George Daniel; Ross MacDonald; Adam Hann	Facedown (EP) and The 1975 (Deluxe Edition)	2012 and 2013	
"Yeah I Know"	The 1975	Matthew Healy; George Daniel; Ross MacDonald; Adam Hann	Notes on a Conditional Form	2020	
"You"	The 1975	Matthew Healy; George Daniel; Ross MacDonald; Adam Hann	Sex (EP) and The 1975 (Deluxe Edition)	2012 and 2013	
"You're Here That's the Thing"	Beabadoobee	Matthew Healy; Beatrice Ilejay Laus; Jacob Bugden	Beatopia	2022	

== Unreleased songs ==
Name of song, featured performers, writers
Song	Artist(s)	Writer(s)	Notes	Ref.
"28"	The 1975	Matthew Healy; George Daniel; Ross MacDonald; Adam Hann	First played by the band at their headlining show at Latitude Festival in 2017	
"Au Bord De La Mer"	Drive Like I Do	Matthew Healy; George Daniel; Ross MacDonald; Adam Hann		
"And Then The Sand We Sink In"	Truman Black	Matthew Healy		
"Clean"	The 1975	Matthew Healy; George Daniel; Ross MacDonald; Adam Hann		
"Depth"	The 1975	Matthew Healy; George Daniel; Ross MacDonald; Adam Hann		
"Forward"	The 1975	Matthew Healy; George Daniel; Ross MacDonald; Adam Hann		
"Foreword"	Drive Like I Do	Matthew Healy; George Daniel; Ross MacDonald; Adam Hann		
"Ghosts"	BIGSLEEP	Matthew Healy; George Daniel; Ross MacDonald; Adam Hann	Written when the 1975 was called BIGSLEEP	
"I Can’t Believe We’re Back on Emerald Hill"	Drive Like I Do	Matthew Healy; George Daniel; Ross MacDonald; Adam Hann		
"Jump.Start.Souxie."	Drive Like I Do	Matthew Healy; George Daniel; Ross MacDonald; Adam Hann		
"Kobra Kai Never Dies"	Drive Like I Do	Matthew Healy; George Daniel; Ross MacDonald; Adam Hann		
"Liu Kang vs. Ryu"	Drive Like I Do	Matthew Healy; George Daniel; Ross MacDonald; Adam Hann		
"Loads of Crisps"	The 1975	Matthew Healy; George Daniel	Described by Healy as a precursor to "Paris"	
"Lost Boys"	Drive Like I Do	Matthew Healy; George Daniel; Ross MacDonald; Adam Hann		
"Make It Happen"	The 1975	Matthew Healy; George Daniel; Ross MacDonald; Adam Hann		
"Moon"	Drive Like I Do	Matthew Healy; George Daniel; Ross MacDonald; Adam Hann		
"More Than You"	Slowdown	Matthew Healy; George Daniel; Ross MacDonald; Adam Hann		
"Nice Sweater (thank you means a lot)"	Drive Like I Do	Matthew Healy; Jacob Bugden		
"Penelope"	Drive Like I Do	Matthew Healy; George Daniel; Ross MacDonald; Adam Hann		
"Plastic Boyfriend"	The 1975	Matthew Healy; George Daniel		
"Scary Monsters"	Drive Like I Do	Matthew Healy; George Daniel; Ross MacDonald; Adam Hann		
"Take Out Your Air Guns, They’ll Come"	Drive Like I Do	Matthew Healy; George Daniel; Ross MacDonald; Adam Hann		
"Shoot Out at the University Fair"	Drive Like I Do	Matthew Healy; George Daniel; Ross MacDonald; Adam Hann		
"The Go"	Drive Like I Do	Matthew Healy; George Daniel; Ross MacDonald; Adam Hann		
"This Feeling"	The 1975	Matthew Healy; George Daniel	First conceptualized during the production of the 1975's fourth studio album Notes on a Conditional Form; Was originally on the 1975's fifth studio album Being Funny in a Foreign Language but Healy pulled it off from the record as it reminded him of a recent breakup; Healy and Daniel completed the song “When We Are Together” in under 48 hours as a replacement	
"Unreleased Midnights song"	The 1975; Taylor Swift	Matthew Healy; Taylor Swift; George Daniel; Jack Antonoff		
"Unreleased Lewis Capaldi song"	Lewis Capaldi	Matthew Healy; Lewis Capaldi		
"We Are The Streetfighters"	Drive Like I Do	Matthew Healy; George Daniel; Ross MacDonald; Adam Hann		
"Wolves"	Drive Like I Do	Matthew Healy; George Daniel; Ross MacDonald; Adam Hann		
"Youth Collective"	Drive Like I Do	Matthew Healy; George Daniel; Ross MacDonald; Adam Hann		
