= George Daniel =

Belgian-British drummer (born 1990)

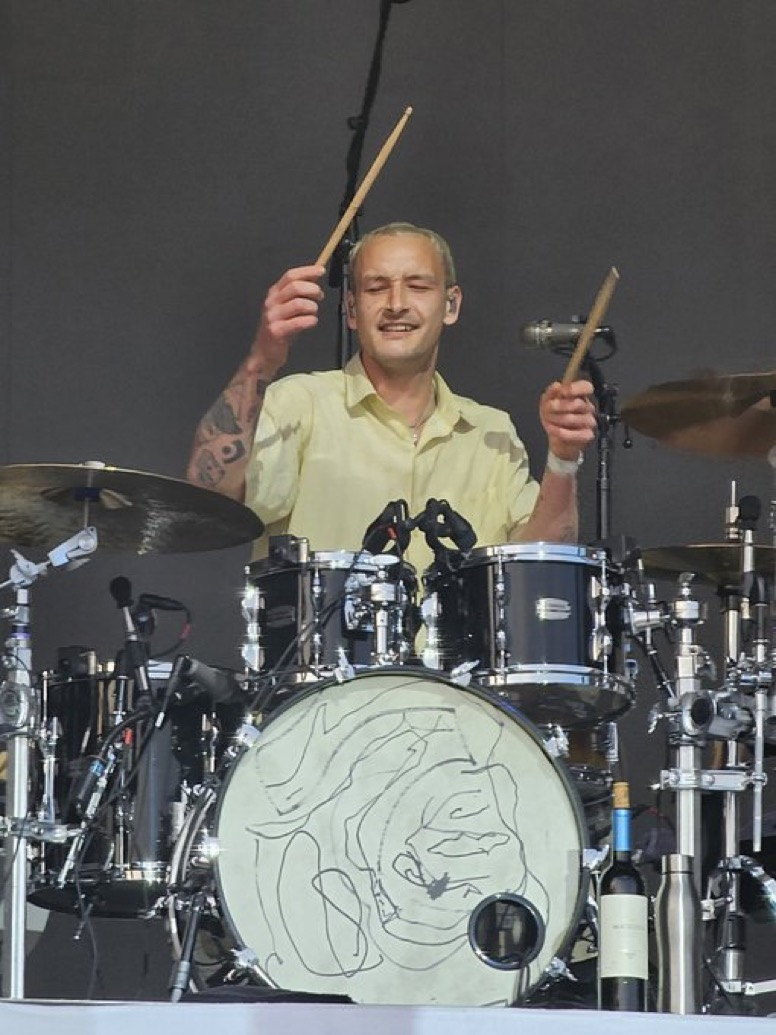
- Daniel performing in Dublin in 2023

Background information
- Born: George Bedford Daniel; 23 March 1990 (age 36); Brussels, Belgium
- Origin: Wilmslow, England
- Occupations: Musician; record producer
- Years active: 2002–present
- Label: DH2
- Member of: The 1975
- Spouse: Charli XCX (m. 2025)

George Bedford Daniel (born 23 March 1990) is a Belgian-British drummer, record producer, DJ and electronic musician. He came to prominence as a member of the rock band the 1975, as part of which he released five albums that topped the UK Albums Chart. His songwriting and producing partnership with the band's vocalist Matty Healy made him the co-recipient of multiple awards and nominations including two Ivor Novello Awards and four Brit Awards. He has also been co-nominated twice for the Mercury Prize and once for the Grammy Awards. He released his debut single, "Screen Cleaner", in August 2024.

Daniel married British singer and songwriter Charli XCX in July 2025. He has produced several of her tracks, including "In the City", "Club Classics" and "Apple". "In the City" and "Apple" charted on the UK singles chart at numbers 41 and 8, respectively. He also co-produced the Japanese House's Good at Falling (2019) and In the End It Always Does (2023), which charted on the UK Albums Chart at numbers 64 and 29 respectively.

== Early life ==
George Bedford Daniel was born on March 23, 1990, in Brussels, Belgium, and grew up in Seattle, Washington, US. He was first inspired by the airiness of Fleetwood Mac's works. He later moved to England and enrolled at Wilmslow High School. In 2002, he joined the 1975 as drummer, replacing Matty Healy, who had been promoted to lead singer, replacing future Editors keyboardist Elliott Williams. At the time, the band made emo music and used the name Drive Like I Do. Having taken music technology at GCSE, Daniel left school at sixteen and studied electronic music at a Manchester college. While there, his tutors introduced him to works by Aphex Twin, Luke Vibert, Squarepusher, and Boards of Canada, and Daniel would regularly use the studio at college to work on the band's wares, even going so far as to submit 1975 content as coursework. To keep the band together, Daniel and bandmates Adam Hann and Ross MacDonald went to university in Manchester, during which time all four members worked as delivery drivers for a Chinese restaurant.

== Career ==
=== The 1975 ===
By 2010, The 1975 was being managed by Jamie Oborne. After finding that labels were not interested, Oborne set up Dirty Hit, and signed the band for £20. On that label, the 1975 released four extended plays (Facedown in August 2012, Sex in November 2012, Music for Cars in March 2013 and IV in May 2013), the UK Albums Chart-topping albums The 1975 (2013), I Like It When You Sleep, for You Are So Beautiful yet So Unaware of It (2016), A Brief Inquiry into Online Relationships (2018), Notes on a Conditional Form (2020) and Being Funny in a Foreign Language (2022), and multiple singles including "Give Yourself a Try" and "Love It If We Made It". Their second and third albums were nominated for the Mercury Prize, (Note: For the second, see.; For the third, see.) with the latter winning a Brit Award for British Album of the Year in 2019, while "Give Yourself a Try" was nominated for a Grammy Award for Best Rock Song in 2020 and "Love It If We Made It" won an Ivor Novello Award for Best Contemporary Song. With Healy, Daniel was jointly nominated for Songwriter of the Year at the 2023 Ivor Novello Awards, and with the 1975, Daniel is joint recipient of 2017's Brit Award for British Group, 2019's GQ Band of the Year award at the GQ Men of the Year Awards and Ivor Novello Award for Songwriter of the Year, 2020's NME Band Of The Decade Award, Best British Band and NME Innovation Award at that year's NME awards, and 2023's Brit Award for British Rock/Alternative Act.

In May 2016, Daniel broke his shoulder after slipping off their tour bus. He was temporarily replaced by the Japanese House's drummer Freddy Sheed, whom he later congratulated for learning their entire set in less than 24 hours. The band toured their Music for Cars tour between 2018 and March 2020, when the COVID-19 pandemic ended it early. Daniel spent lockdown practicing his DJing skills.

The 1975's fifth album was delayed by the band hitting a wall as a result of Daniel's depression and Healy's breakup with FKA Twigs. The band resumed touring in March 2022 and later mounted the At Their Very Best and Still... At Their Very Best tours; Daniel spent post-pandemic 1975 afterparties deejaying. After a gig at Finsbury Park, which took place on 2 July 2023 and saw Healy apologise for multiple personal indiscretions, Dirty Hit's general manager suggested mounting a Dirty Hit club night, prompting a suggestion that the label launch an imprint. At the time, Charli XCX's managers had just began managing Kelly Lee Owens, who Daniel had been wanting to collaborate with for some years. Later that month, comments made by Healy at Malaysia's Good Vibes Festival got the festival cancelled two days early, prompting its organiser to sue the band's individual members for restitution. Healy later stated in a September 2023 concert in Sacramento that the band would go on "indefinite hiatus" after finishing their booked run of concerts; at the time, their last scheduled gig was in March 2024.

Daniel later signed Owens to Dh2, which launched in July 2024 with her single "Love You Got" and with a party at Phonox in Brixton. The party involved performances from the imprint's first signing Kelly Lee Owens and from DJs Oscar Farrell and TimFromTheHouse. The following month, he released "Screen Cleaner", a glitchy three-minute-30-second dance track cowritten by both its vocalist Tove Lo (Note: For the fact that she wrote it, see.; For the fact that she sung on it, see.) and TimFromTheHouse. The track had previously been performed at various events including appearances with Charli XCX at Glastonbury Festival, Boiler Room New York, Amnesia in Ibiza, and Venue MOT with Jamie xx in London. Remixes were later released by Farrell and Kelbin. In November 2024, Daniel released a further track, "Chlorine", which combined ambient music and techno. A further track, February 2025's "Volc3", featured Farrell.

=== Other works ===
In October 2012, he played drums on "Bayonne" on Little Comets's Life Is Elsewhere, which charted at No. 70 on the UK Albums Chart. In 2015, after Healy met the Japanese House via an ex-girlfriend, he and Daniel coproduced her EP Pools to Bathe In. She and Daniel would later coproduce her EPs Clean (2015, with Healy), Swim Against the Tide (2016), and Saw You in a Dream (2017, with Healy), followed by her albums Good at Falling (2019, with BJ Burton) and In the End It Always Does (2023, with Chloe Kraemer). The last two of these which charted at numbers 64 and 29 on the UK Albums Chart. In 2017, Healy and Daniel produced Pale Waves's "There's a Honey" and "Television Romance".

In 2018, after Healy emailed No Rome inviting him to the UK, he and Daniel produced Rome's third EP, RIP Indo Hisashi, as well as his fourth EP the following year, Crying in the Prettiest Places. In 2021, Daniel and Burton coproduced Rome's album It's All Smiles. In June 2021, Healy and Daniel coproduced Beabadoobee's Our Extended Play. The following year, Daniel co-produced Beabadoobee and PinkPantheress's "Tinkerbell is Overrated". The track later appeared on Beabadoobee's album Beatopia, which charted at No. 4 on the UK Albums Chart. In March 2023, Coupdekat stated that "Tinkerbell is Overrated" had inspired her 2023 song "Babyteef".

In March 2022, Daniel and A. G. Cook produced the title track to Charli XCX's album Crash, and later that month Daniel produced its deluxe version tracks "Selfish Girl" and "How Can I Not Know What I Need Right Now". The following July, he produced her single "Hot Girl", which appeared on the soundtrack for Bodies Bodies Bodies, and the following month he coproduced her and Leo Birenberg's Bottoms. In January 2023, they teamed up for a remix of Caroline Polachek's "Welcome to My Island", and that October, he co-produced Charli XCX's and Sam Smith's single "In the City", which charted at No. 41 on the UK singles chart. For her 2024 album Brat, he produced Charli XCX's "Club Classics" and "Apple", the latter of which charted at No. 8 on the UK singles chart. "Club Classics" was released as a single alongside "B2B", which featured Daniel on the cover art. Daniel later went viral after refusing to take part in "Apple"'s dance, only relenting on the opening date of her Brat tour. In addition, Brat's "Sympathy Is a Knife" and "Club Classics" mention Daniel by name.

In May 2023, he coproduced "Feels Like My Hands Are On Fire" from Salute's EP Shield, which also featured contributions from Sammy Virji and No Rome. Shaad D'Souza of The Face wrote in August 2024 that dance acts like Salute, Virji, and Floating Points had "energised" Daniel in "recent years". The following month, Daniel released two remixes of Salute and Minami Nakamura's "Go!" from the former's album True Magic. In August 2023, he released a remix of Carly Rae Jepsen's "Shadow", an album track from The Loveliest Time, which she had released the previous month. That September, he remixed Coco & Clair Clair's "The Hills", featuring Deela, which appeared on the deluxe version of their album Sexy.

== Personal life ==
At the 2019 GQ Awards, he was photographed with Charli XCX, who announced their relationship in May 2022; her 2024 track "Talk Talk" was about an incident at the 2020 NME Awards in which Charli XCX, who had been talking to Daniel online but had not yet met him in person, almost followed him into a toilet but stopped short of introducing herself. Both Charli XCX and the 1975 featured on "Spinning", a UK No. 94 single for No Rome, which they had worked on at that year's St Jerome's Laneway Festival in 2020. Charli XCX announced their engagement in November 2023, in a selfie uploaded to her private Instagram account in which she flaunted a diamond ring. In subsequent since-deleted photos with Daniel uploaded to her public Instagram account, Charli XCX stated that the pair were "fucking for life". On 19 July 2025, the pair married at the Hackney Town Hall in Hackney, London. On 14 September 2025, the pair had a second wedding in Scopello, Sicily, attended by friends and family.

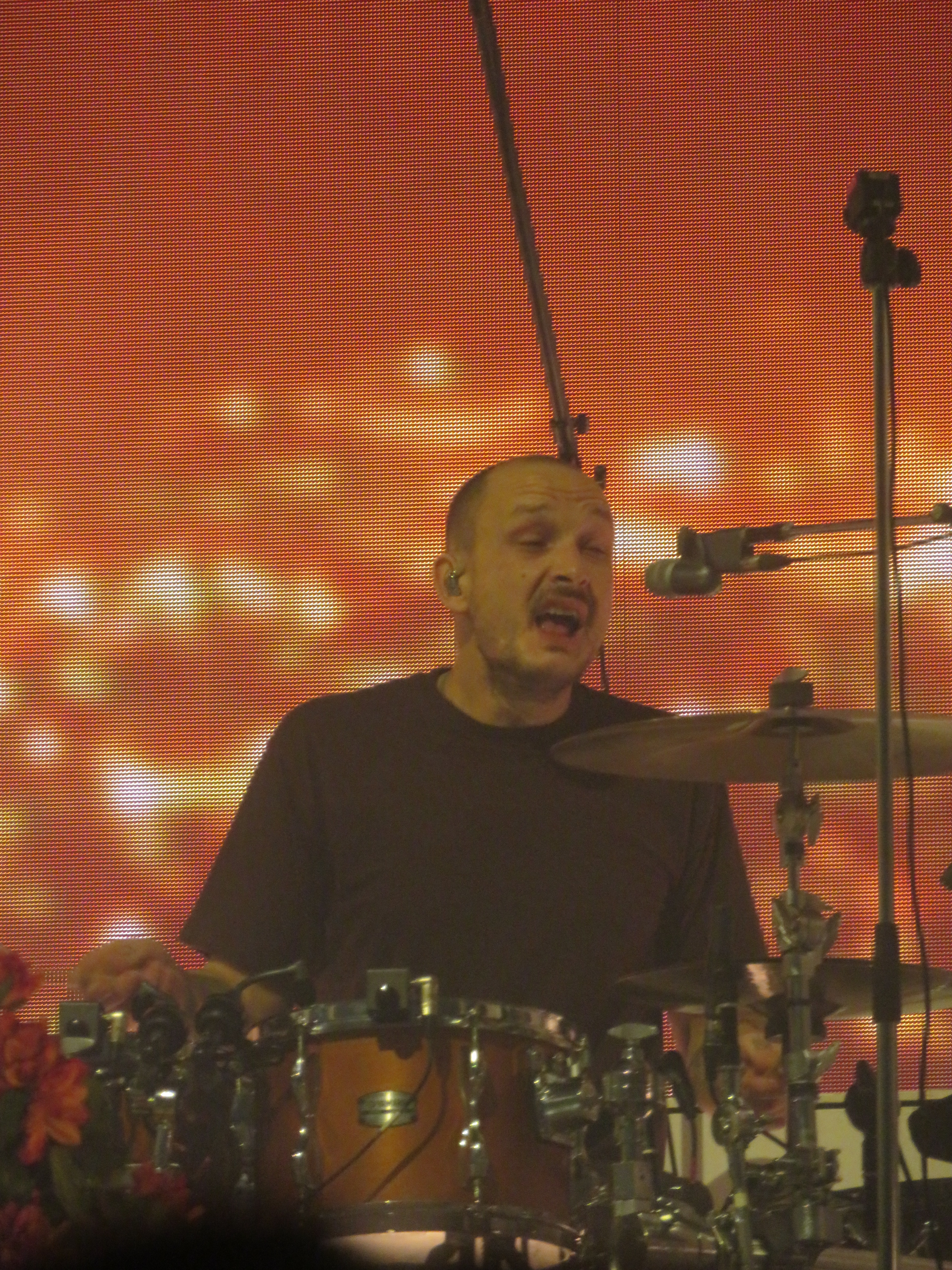
Daniel performing in Manchester in 2024
