= In the End It Always Does =

Studio album by the Japanese House
- Released: 30 June 2023
- Length: 44:58
- Label: Dirty Hit
- Producers: Amber Bain; George Daniel; Chloe Kraemer

The Japanese House chronology
Chewing Cotton Wool (2020)	In the End It Always Does (2023)	ITEIAD Sessions (2023)

Singles from In The End It Always Does
- 1. "Boyhood" Released: 20 March 2023; 2. "Sad to Breathe" Released: 18 April 2023; 3. "Sunshine Baby" Released: 18 May 2023; 4. "One for Sorrow, Two for Joni Jones" Released: 8 June 2023

In the End It Always Does is the second studio album by English indie pop musician Amber Bain, under the name the Japanese House. It was released on 30 June 2023 through Dirty Hit. The 12 tracks run 45 minutes. The album was received positively.

== Background ==
The record was written in late 2021 and sees the musician "returning to her muse". Inspiration came from her "current relationship to her identity" and "growing up queer", mainly tackled by the lead single "Boyhood". The album came together as a result of all the relationships she has begun and lost over the years. Furthermore, it explores her experience of moving to Margate for a relationship that eventually came to an end. Diving more into the pop genre, the artist explores a multitude of topics, such as "beginnings and endings", "obsession and mundanity" and "falling in love and falling apart". Bain created the album with the help of Matty Healy and George Daniel from the 1975, Katie Gavin of Muna and Justin Vernon of Bon Iver, amongst others. Production and engineering was handled by Chloe Kraemer, an experience she describes as "life-changing".

Bain announced the album in April 2023. Upon announcing the record, she released the second single "Sad to Breathe", a song she wrote "a long time ago" and which is in fact "one of the oldest" on the album. The song talks about disbelief following the departure of a person.

== Critical reception ==
Professional ratings
Aggregate scores
Source	Rating
Metacritic	82/100
Review scores
Source	Rating
Gigwise	8/10 stars
Pitchfork	7.0/10
The Skinny	3/5 stars
Slant Magazine	3.5/5 stars

In the End It Always Does received a score of 82 out of 100 on review aggregator Metacritic based on ten critics' reviews, indicating "universal acclaim". Adele Julia of Gigwise described the album as "a candid portrait of navigating the romantic world" and felt that "one of the record's greatest strengths is its unabashed discussions surrounding queerness and sexuality". Julia concluded that it is "so rare to find pop music [...] that holds honesty at its core despite the potential for rejection, creating an album that feels immediately resonant". The Skinny's Katie Cutforth remarked that the album has "a summery ambience, songs about emotional distance, and [Bain's] unmistakable voice", with her approach seeming as if "it's been flipped, with vocal hooks taking a backseat to highly textured folktronica instrumentation and a more impressionistic rendering of desire". Eric Mason of Slant Magazine called the album "heartfelt and fun in equal measure, flitting between moods and styles", although "with all this exploration, the record lacks a little impact, not quite achieving the cohesion and emotional gravity of Good at Falling". Brady Brickner-Wood of Pitchfork felt that the album "strikes a beautiful equilibrium, wedding perceptive writing with bright, buoyant production", writing that Bain is "at her best when she's embracing a sense of playfulness, winking as subtly as she cries, sashaying between humor and hurt".

== Track listing ==
All tracks are written by Amber Bain, except where noted. All tracks are produced by Bain, George Daniel, and Chloe Kraemer, except where noted.

No.	Title	Writer(s)	Producer(s)	Length
1.	"Spot Dog"	Amber Bain; George Daniel	Bain	4:28
2.	"Touching Yourself"		Bain; Daniel	3:01
3.	"Sad to Breathe"			3:34
4.	"Over There"	Bain; Phil Cook; Justin Vernon	Bain; Daniel	4:42
5.	"Morning Pages" (featuring Muna)	Bain; Katie Gavin		3:47
6.	"Boyhood"	Bain; Kraemer; Jessica Miller		3:09
7.	"Indexical Reminder of a Morning Well Spent"		Bain; Daniel	4:42
8.	"Friends"	Bain; Charlotte Aitchison		3:08
9.	"Sunshine Baby"	Bain; Daniel; Kraemer	Bain	3:39
10.	"Baby Goes Again"			3:31
11.	"You Always Get What You Want"			2:47
12.	"One for Sorrow, Two for Joni Jones"	Bain; Gavin; Kraemer		4:30
Total length:				44:58

Notes

- "Indexical Reminder of a Morning Well Spent", "Baby Goes Again", "You Always Get What You Want", and "One for Sorrow, Two for Joni Jones" are all stylised in sentence case.

== Charts ==
Chart performance for In the End It Always Does
Chart (2023)	Peak position
Scottish Albums (Official Charts)	12
UK Albums (Official Charts)	29
UK Independent Albums (Official Charts)	3
