= Face Like Thunder =

Single by The Japanese House

from the EP Swim Against the Tide
- Released: 26 September 2016
- Length: 4:13
- Label: Dirty Hit
- Songwriter: Amber Bain

The Japanese House singles chronology
"Sugar Pill" (2015)	"Face Like Thunder" (2016)	"Swim Against the Tide" (2016)

"Face Like Thunder" is a single by English indie pop act The Japanese House (Amber Bain) from her third EP Swim Against the Tide. "Face Like Thunder" was released on 26 September 2016.

== Background ==
Bain originally wrote "Face Like Thunder" years in advance of its release, before she released her debut EP Pools to Bathe In in 2015. It was later included as the first single from Swim Against the Tide, Bain's third EP. In an interview with Atwood Magazine, Bain stated that the song was "vaguely I guess, about a couple, maybe breaking up or maybe coming to the end of the relationship—maybe it's a couple or maybe it's two parts of the same person".

The desert imagery of the song's music video was inspired by the song's themes of loneliness and endings. When planning the music video for "Face Like Thunder", Bain, who is a lesbian, decided to cast a male as her romantic interest to avoid accusations that she was "[jumping] on the lesbian bandwagon". She later described this as "stupid" and said that she no longer cared what people thought about her sexuality.

== Release ==
Professional ratings
Review scores
Source	Rating
Red Hawk Radio	8.5/10 stars

"Face Like Thunder" was premiered on Annie Mac's BBC Radio 1 show on 26 September 2016 and was released the same day. Bain released a music video for "Face Like Thunder" directed by Gareth Philips on 17 October 2016.

== Reception ==
"Face Like Thunder" was well received by critics, with several making comparisons between Bain's vocals and those of Imogen Heap. Consequence of Sound praised the song's use of cheerful pop sounds to mask emotionally heavy lyrics, and made positive comparisons to Future and Of Montreal. In its review of the Swim Against the Tide EP, Dork called the single "arguably the perfect soundtrack to any late-summer drive, with the sort of hook that would bring Smash Hits back to life in a heartbeat".
