= The LA Sessions =

2019 EP by The Japanese House

EP by The Japanese House
- Released: 8 August 2019
- Length: 13:35
- Label: Dirty Hit
- Producer: Amber Bain; George Daniel; Matthew Healy

The Japanese House chronology
Good at Falling (2019)	The LA Sessions (2019)	Chewing Cotton Wool (2020)

The LA Sessions is the fifth extended play by English indie pop act The Japanese House (Amber Bain). It features reimagined live versions of four tracks from Bain's discography. The EP was recorded live in Los Angeles and released on 8 August 2019 through Dirty Hit.

== Overview ==
The EP was recorded live in Los Angeles, and features live renditions of three tracks from The Japanese House's first LP Good at Falling, as well as the single "Somebody You Found" from Saw You in a Dream. The songs were stripped back and sections were reimagined for inclusion on the EP. Live videos were released to accompany the tracks.

== Track listing ==
No.	Title	Length
1.	"Lilo" (live)	3:34
2.	"Somebody You Found" (live)	3:41
3.	"You Seemed So Happy" (live)	2:45
4.	"Everybody Hates Me" (live)	2:59
Total length:		20:01
