= Lilo (song) =

Single by The Japanese House

from the album Good at Falling
- Released: 27 September 2018
- Length: 4:10
- Label: Dirty Hit; Interscope
- Songwriter: Amber Bain

The Japanese House singles chronology
| "Saw You in a Dream" (2017) | "Lilo" (2018) | "Follow My Girl" (2018) |

"Lilo" is a song by the English indie pop act The Japanese House (Amber Bain). It was released on 27 September 2018 as the lead single from her 2019 debut album Good at Falling.

== Background ==
Bain has stated that "Lilo" was about her relationship with singer-songwriter Marika Hackman. The lyrics deal heavily with themes of falling in love and subsequently falling out of love, wrapped around the imagery of a "lilo", British slang for a personal flotation device. Bain later asked Hackman to appear in the music video, after the actress originally cast dropped out.

== Release ==
"Lilo" was premiered on Zane Lowe's Beats 1 show on 27 September 2018, the same day as the single's official release via Dirty Hit/Interscope Records. The music video was released on 29 October 2018. The music video was praised for its atmospheric cinematography and the intimacy of its subject matter.

== Reception ==
"Lilo" received positive reviews from critics, especially for its vocals, composition and lyrics. Gabriel Aikins of Substream magazine praised "Lilo" for Bain's vocals and use of electronic filters, and described the lyrics as "descriptive and affecting". Melodic's Jones Willingham also praised the single for its pacing and emotionality,

In 2019, Billboard included the song in its list of the "30 Lesbian Love Songs".
