= Medicine (The 1975 song) =

Single by The 1975
- Released: 31 October 2014
- Recorded: 2014
- Genre: Ambient pop; dream pop
- Length: 5:52
- Label: Dirty Hit
- Songwriters: Matthew Healy; George Daniel
- Producers: Matthew Healy; George Daniel

The 1975 singles chronology
"Heart Out" (2014)	"Medicine" (2014)	"Love Me" (2015)

"Medicine" is a standalone song by the English rock band The 1975, released on 31 October 2014 for the 2014 Drive re-release. It was written, produced and performed by members Matty Healy and George Daniel.

== Background and release ==
The song was written and produced by Healy and Daniel, and it was only performed by them as well. Healy stated:

"We wrote Medicine for our chosen scenes. Medicine, its title and sentiment, goes all the way back to the original The 1975 project that was based in my bedroom. It's a new piece of music informed by the genesis of our band and our love for Drive as a film. ... The movie itself plays with the duality of resignment and hope - and this is most obvious and stirring in the scenes we chose to score. The song is a testament to that same idea and has in turn become one of our most personal and best loved pieces of music to date."

It was premiered on BBC Radio 1 at 7:30 pm on 30 October 2014, a few hours before Drive was shown on BBC Three. The single was released to iTunes as a digital download the next day.

== Track listing ==
No.	Title	Length
1.	"Medicine"	5:52

B-side (Only appears on vinyl release)
No.	Title	Length
2.	"Medicine (reprise)"	2:18

== Charts ==
Chart (2014)	Peak position
Ireland (IRMA)	74
UK Singles (Official Charts)	53
UK Indie (Official Charts)	1
US Hot Rock & Alternative Songs (Billboard)	46

== See also ==
- The 1975 discography
- List of songs by Matty Healy
