= Good at Falling =

2019 studio album by the Japanese House

Studio album by the Japanese House
- Released: 1 March 2019
- Length: 44:08
- Label: Dirty Hit
- Producer: The Japanese House; George Daniel; BJ Burton

The Japanese House chronology
Saw You in a Dream (2017)	Good at Falling (2019)	The LA Sessions (2019)

Professional ratings
Aggregate scores
Source	Rating
AnyDecentMusic?	7.4/10
Metacritic	82/100
Review scores
Source	Rating
Clash	9/10
DIY	4/5 stars
NME	4/5 stars
Pitchfork	7.5/10
PopMatters	8/10
Sputnikmusic	2.9/5

Good at Falling is the debut studio album by English indie pop musician Amber Bain, under the name the Japanese House. It was released on 1 March 2019 by Dirty Hit, after Bain released four extended plays spanning three years; Pools to Bathe In, Clean, Swim Against the Tide and Saw You in a Dream. The album was produced by Amber Bain alongside BJ Burton and the 1975 drummer/producer George Daniel.

== Track listing ==
All tracks are written by Amber Bain. All tracks produced by the Japanese House, BJ Burton and George Daniel.

No.	Title	Length
1.	"Went to Meet Her (Intro)"	2:31
2.	"Maybe You're the Reason"	3:39
3.	"We Talk All the Time"	3:15
4.	"Wild"	3:43
5.	"You Seemed So Happy"	2:42
6.	"Follow My Girl"	4:04
7.	"Somethingfartoogoodtofeel"	4:26
8.	"Lilo"	4:10
9.	"Everybody Hates Me"	3:09
10.	"Marika Is Sleeping"	3:03
11.	"Worms"	3:18
12.	"Faraway"	2:50
13.	"I Saw You in a Dream"	3:20
Total length:		44:08

Notes

- Track 12 features backing vocals by Matty Healy and is stylised as "f a r a w a y".

== Charts ==
Chart (2019)	Peak position
Australian Hitseekers Albums (ARIA)	8
UK Albums (OCC)	64
US Heatseekers Albums (Billboard)	6
US Vinyl Albums (Billboard)	23
