= Saw You in a Dream (song) =

Single by The Japanese House

from the EP Saw You in a Dream
- Released: 26 April 2017
- Length: 3:28
- Label: Dirty Hit
- Songwriter: Amber Bain

The Japanese House singles chronology
"Good Side In" (2016)	"Saw You in a Dream" (2017)	"Somebody You Found" (2017)

"Saw You in a Dream" is a song by English indie pop act the Japanese House (Amber Bain), released in 2017 as the lead single from the EP Saw You in a Dream. It was later rerecorded for her 2019 debut album Good at Falling, which removed the drum machine.

== Release ==
"Saw You in a Dream" was released on 26 April 2017 as the first single from Bain's EP of the same name. George Daniel of The 1975 was featured as a drummer on the single. A music video for "Saw You in a Dream" was released on 16 May 2017 and featured Bain in a surreal film studio sets which symbolized shifting between different dreams.

== Reception ==
"Saw You in a Dream" received positive reviews when it was released, with critics praising Bain's vocals, and the contrast of peaceful nostalgic composition with mournful lyrics. Atwood Magazine called praised the song's descriptive yet simple lyrics and Bain's trademark use of layered vocals. El Hunt of DIY Mag noted the song's departure from Bain's usual production heavy electronic style in favour of a more stripped down, melodic composition.
