= Bottoms (soundtrack) =

Bottoms (Original Motion Picture Score)

Soundtrack album by Charli XCX and Leo Birenberg
- Released: August 25, 2023
- Length: 45:05
- Label: Milan
- Producers: George Daniel; A. G. Cook; Ramiro Rodriguez Zamarripa; Leo Birenberg

Charli XCX chronology
Crash (2022)	Bottoms (2023)	Brat (2024)

Leo Birenberg chronology
Twisted Metal (2023)	Bottoms (2023)	Obliterated (2023)

Bottoms (Original Motion Picture Score) is the soundtrack to the 2023 film of the same name directed by Emma Seligman. Released in conjunction with the film's limited theatrical premiere on August 25, 2023, by Milan Records, the album consists of 27 tracks from the film's score composed in a collaborative effort between singer-songwriter Charli XCX and composer Leo Birenberg; Bottoms marked the former's feature film scoring debut. The soundtrack is further produced by George Daniel and A. G. Cook, who also composed additional music with Ramiro Rodriguez Zamarripa.

== Development ==
During production of the film, director Emma Seligman and lead actress-screenwriter Rachel Sennott wanted a Y2K sad girl anthem for the film, based on the lines of "Come Clean" by Hilary Duff. Seligman listened to songs by Charli XCX in her playlist while writing the script, and Charli XCX happened to record the song "Hot Girl" for Bodies Bodies Bodies (2022), which also starred Sennott. In a podcast conversation with Sennott, Charli XCX claimed that she was a fan of Sennott and Seligman's Shiva Baby (2020) and insisted on contributing to the film. Though Sennott felt that Charli XCX would only collaborate on one of the songs, she persuaded her to write the film's score. Seligman stated:

What is so amazing about her, not only does she have a singular voice, but she can do an emotional [song], she can do fun, she can do exciting, everything. She also happens to be a queer icon who is so beloved, is such an incredible straight ally, and supports queer artists so much.

Birenberg was later involved in the music composition process by augmenting the production and solely composing a few themes, making it a collaboration between the two artists.

== Reception ==
Katie Rife of IGN wrote "Even the music has a lot going on, combining Charli XCX's 1980s-style synth score with hilariously timed needle drops from Avril Lavigne and Bonnie Tyler. An excess of material is far from the worst problem a comedy can have, to be fair." Monica Castillo of RogerEbert.com complimented "The movie features needle drops aplenty, and extra modern beats provided by Leo Birenberg and Charli XCX. It's one silly bit after another, like candies rolling off a conveyor belt."

== Track listing ==
Bottoms (Original Motion Picture Score) track listing
No.	Title	Music	Length
1.	"Bottoms"	Charlotte Aitchison; Leo Birenberg	1:54
2.	"Yes No Okay"	Aitchison	3:05
3.	"School Fair"	Aitchison; Birenberg	1:32
4.	"Jeff"	Birenberg	0:41
5.	"Vehicular Jeff-slaughter"	Birenberg	1:16
6.	"Tim to the Rescue"	Birenberg	0:52
7.	"Lockers"	Aitchison; Birenberg	0:39
8.	"Huntington Horrors"	Birenberg	1:09
9.	"Mr. G"	Aitchison; Birenberg	1:21
10.	"Teaching Each Other"	Aitchison; Birenberg	1:10
11.	"Tim's Suspicions"	Birenberg	0:55
12.	"Josie at Juvie"	Aitchison; Birenberg	1:16
13.	"Study Buddies"	Birenberg	0:44
14.	"Car Wash"	Aitchison; Birenberg	1:15
15.	"Not in the System"	Birenberg	0:36
16.	"Sex with Mrs. Callahan"	Birenberg	0:32
17.	"All Night"	Aitchison; Birenberg	3:22
18.	"Be With"	Aitchison; Birenberg	3:46
19.	"Thank You for Attending Today's Pep Rally"	Birenberg	4:22
20.	"QB Murders"	Birenberg	0:34
21.	"The Final Fucking Hour"	Aitchison; Birenberg	1:21
22.	"Need to Stop the Game"	Birenberg	2:18
23.	"Setting Up the Bomb"	Birenberg	1:52
24.	"Pineapple Juice"	Aitchison; Birenberg	1:46
25.	"Final Face-Off"	Aitchison; Birenberg	1:06
26.	"End Credits"	Birenberg	3:47
27.	"Dream (Alternate Fight Sequence)"	Aitchison; Birenberg	1:54
Total length:			45:05
