= Saw You in a Dream =

2017 EP by the Japanese House

EP by the Japanese House
- Released: 30 June 2017
- Genre: Dream pop; electropop; yacht rock; indie pop
- Length: 20:01
- Label: Dirty Hit
- Producer: Amber Bain; George Daniel; Matty Healy

The Japanese House chronology
Swim Against the Tide (2016)	Saw You in a Dream (2017)	Good at Falling (2019)

Saw You in a Dream is the fourth extended play by English indie pop act the Japanese House, released on 30 June 2017 through Dirty Hit. It was preceded by Swim Against the Tide, and was followed by her debut album Good at Falling, released 1 March 2019. Upon release, it received mostly positive reviews from critics, with some criticism for a lack of deviation from Bain's established style.

== Background ==
The EP's lead single, "Saw You in a Dream", was inspired by an experience Bain had dreaming of someone she had known who had recently died. The title track "Saw You In a Dream" was released as a single on 26 April 2017.

== Musical style ==
The EP has been described as dream pop, electropop, yacht rock and indie pop. The EP includes a combination of 80s-esque synth beats, acoustic guitars, layered vocals, and melancholic lyrics.

== Reception ==
Professional ratings
Review scores
Source	Rating
Dork	5/5 stars
Riot Mag	4/5 stars
Spectrum Culture	2.75/5 stars
The Student Playlist	7/10 stars
The Edge	4/5 stars

Saw You in a Dream received mostly positive reviews for its composition, symphonic arrangements, and Bain's development of a distinctive style compared to the varied and experimental style of her previous releases. Nicole Almeida of Atwood Magazine positively reviewed the EP, commenting that Bain "talks about love, friendship, loss, and life through mesmerizing and descriptive lyrics which, when coupled with her hypnotizing melodies, result in honest and heartwarming songs."

The single "Saw You in a Dream" was especially well-received for its heartfelt lyrics and contrastingly upbeat melodies. "Count to Nine" was also praised for its dreamy quality, and complex progression.

Joshua Palmer gave a mixed review for Spectrum Culture, on the one hand praising its composition and combination of 80's synthpop with more laidback, minimalistic harmonies, while also criticising both Bain's reluctance to release a full length album and a lack of development between Saw You in a Dream and Bain's previous releases. He concluded that "since Pools to Bathe In, it feels as though the musical and emotional stakes have been falling lower and lower. Hopefully a fully realized album is just around the corner."

== Track listing ==
No.	Title	Length
1.	"Saw You in a Dream"	3:28
2.	"Somebody You Found"	3:33
3.	"3/3"	4:00
4.	"Count to Nine"	9:00
Total length:		20:01
