= The Japanese House =

English musician (born 1995)

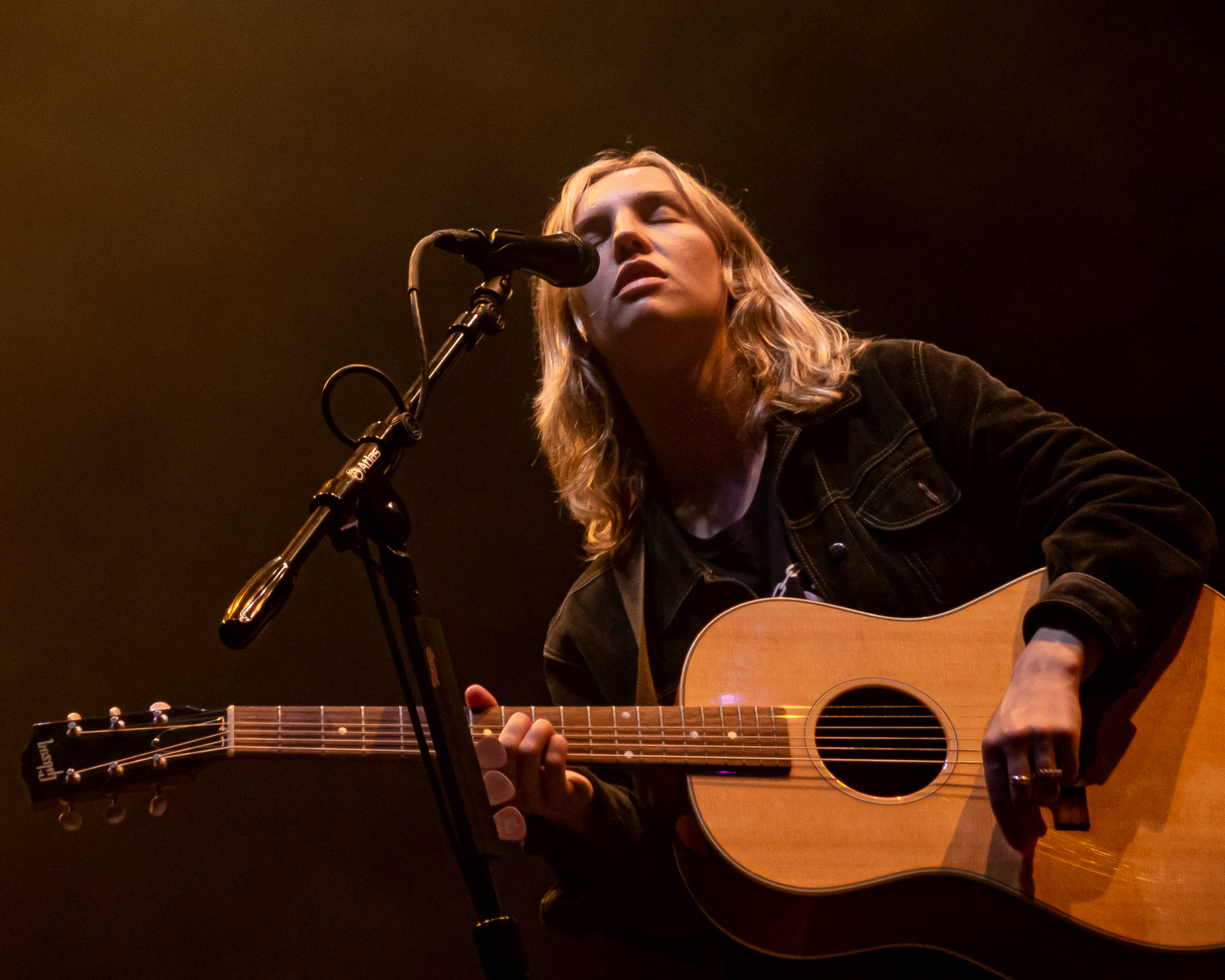
- Bain at The Wiltern in 2019

Background information
- Born: Amber Mary Bain; 13 July 1995 (age 31); Aylesbury, England
- Origin: Buckinghamshire, England
- Genres: Dream pop; indie pop; electropop; yacht rock
- Instruments: Vocals; guitar; keyboards; sampler
- Years active: 2012–present
- Label: Dirty Hit
- Website: thejapanesehouse.co.uk

Amber Mary Bain (born 13 July 1995), known professionally as The Japanese House, is an English indie pop musician from Buckinghamshire. Bain contributes vocals and plays guitar, samplers and keyboards for her music. Bain decided to pursue a career in music as a teenager. She began writing music under the moniker The Japanese House in 2012, after being introduced to Matty Healy of the 1975, who offered to help produce her music under the label Dirty Hit. She first rose to prominence after the release of her first single, "Still", which was a critical success and premiered on BBC Radio 1.

In 2015, Bain released her debut EP Pools to Bathe In and the follow-up Clean. These first two EPs were rooted in indie pop and synth-pop but included experimentation with genres such as dream pop, folktronica and electropop. She toured with Dirty Hit labelmates the 1975 and Wolf Alice in 2015 and 2016 before headlining tours of her own.

Her third EP, Swim Against the Tide (2016), was influenced by 1980s synth-pop. Her fourth EP, Saw You in a Dream (2017), saw her continued experimentation with different genres of electronica and rock. Bain co-produced her first full-length album Good at Falling (2019) with George Daniel and American record producer BJ Burton. Her fifth EP, The LA Sessions (2019), featured live recordings of reimagined tracks from Good at Falling and Saw You in a Dream. In 2023, she released her second album, In the End It Always Does.

== Early life ==
Bain was born in Watford and lived in Harrow, Hemel Hempstead, Buckinghamshire, and Hertfordshire throughout her childhood. As a child, she was taught music by her father, who was also a musician. She continued practicing and recording music throughout her childhood. She began recording music at the age of 11, when she visited her father's house. As a teenager, Bain pursued a career in music rather than going to university, a decision which her father supported as he felt she had "a clear opportunity".

== Career ==
=== 2012–2015: Early career, Pools to Bathe In and Clean ===
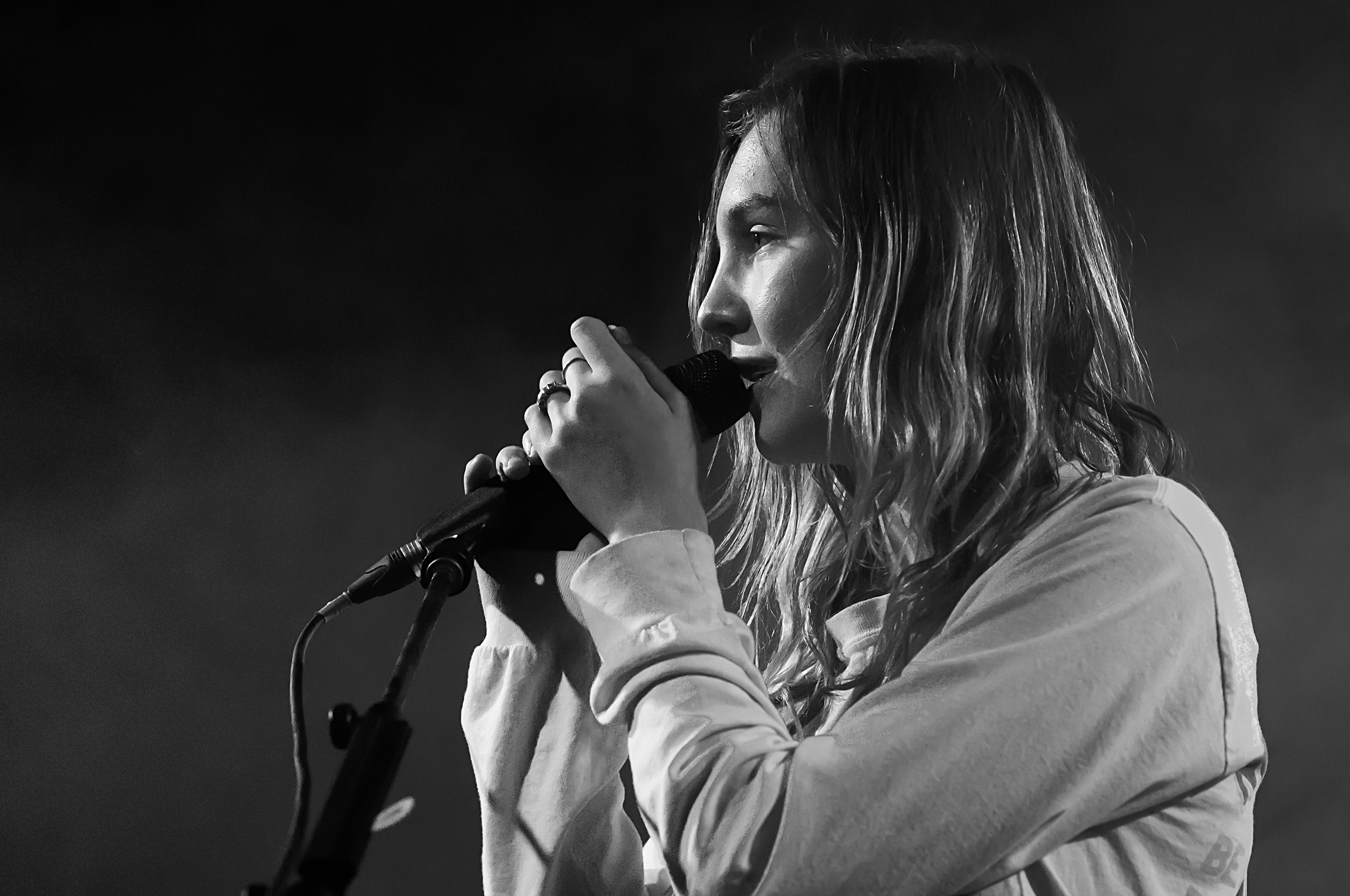
Bain performing in Los Angeles in December 2016

In 2012 Bain's friend introduced her to singer Matty Healy of the 1975, who Bain's friend was dating at the time. Bain began working closely with The 1975, and signed to their label Dirty Hit.

Bain settled on the stage name The Japanese House because she did not feel ready to reveal her name or gender. As a result, very little was known about The Japanese House when her debut single "Still" was premiered on BBC Radio 1 with Zane Lowe on 2 March 2015.

Bain's androgynous voice and avoidance of press photography fuelled speculation about her gender and identity. After the release of "Still", there was widespread speculation that the singer behind The Japanese House was a man, and some fans even speculated that it was a side project of Healy's. Bain went on her first tour as an opening act for the 1975 in 2015. Bain subsequently released three more singles. "Pools to Bathe In" was released on 25 March 2015, "Teeth" on 8 April 2015, and "Sister" on 21 April 2015. Bain's first EP Pools to Bathe In, a compilation of her four previous singles, was released on 27 April 2015 to favourable reviews.

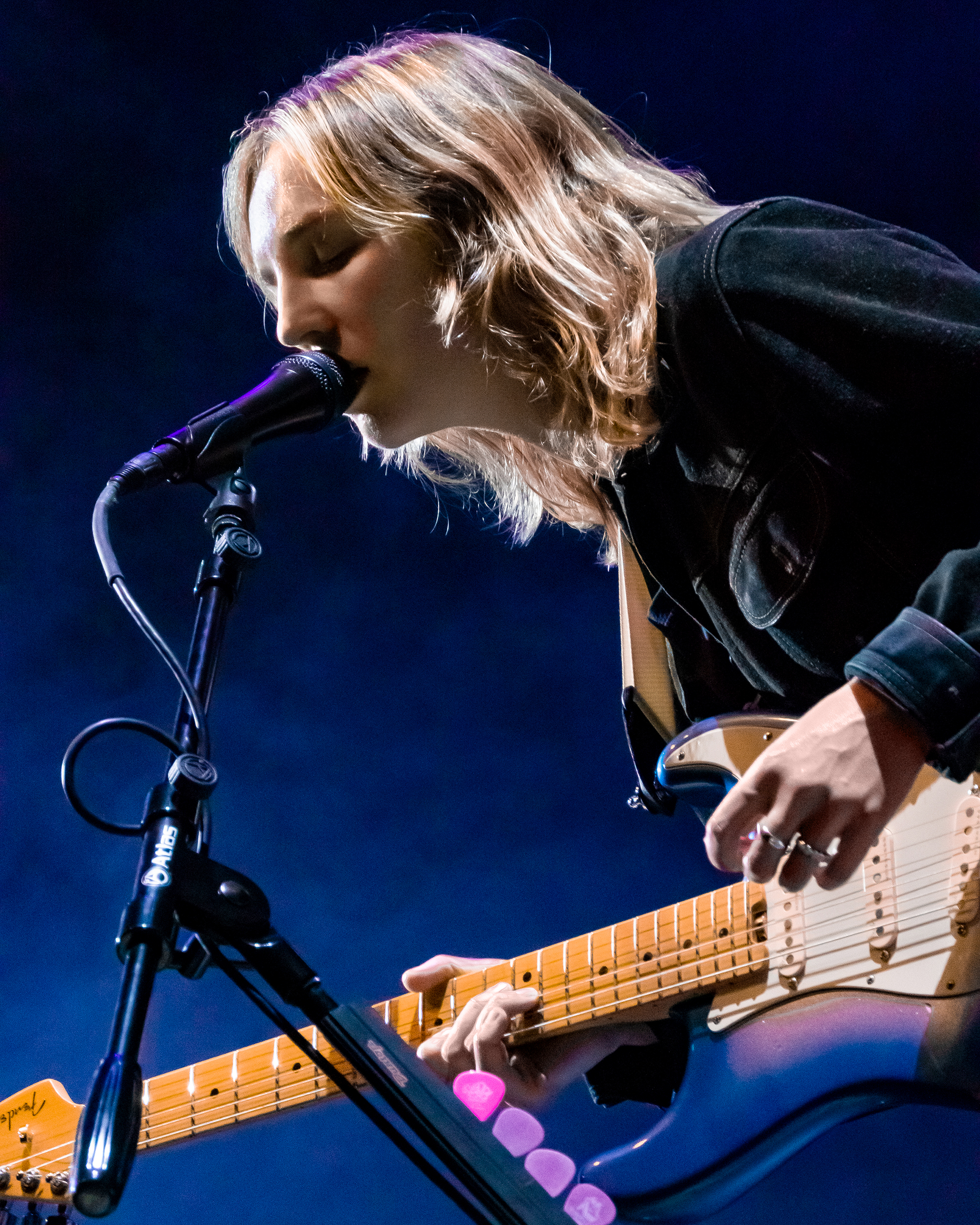
Bain performing at the Wiltern in October 2019

The titular single from the EP Clean was released on 7 September 2015 and premiered on BBC Radio 1 that same day. The EP's second single, "Cool Blue" was released 15 September, followed by "Letter by the Water" on 27 October 2015. The final single, "Sugar Pill" was released on 3 November 2015. Clean was released on 6 November 2015, and received positive reviews from critics.

=== 2016–2017: Swim Against the Tide and Saw You in a Dream ===
On 26 September 2016 Bain released "Face Like Thunder", the first single from her upcoming EP Swim Against the Tide. Bain stated that the EP's title was inspired by the feeling of falling in love and losing someone, saying "[it] feels like you're swimming against the tide. In a sense it's a struggle". The track received favourable reviews for its emotional subject matter and melodic beat.

Bain released Swim Against the Tide on 11 November 2016. She supported the 1975 on their 2016 North American tour to promote their second album, I Like It When You Sleep, for You Are So Beautiful yet So Unaware of It. The Japanese House headlined a North American tour beginning on 21 February 2017 and ending on 28 March.

On 26 April 2017 Bain released the single "Saw You in a Dream". The single was noted for using fewer layered tracks, and having a starker, less production heavy sound than many of Bain's previous songs. The full EP Saw You in a Dream was originally scheduled for release on 16 June 2017 but was released on 30 June. The EP was praised for showcasing the evolution of Bain's dreamy style, with strong vocals and a more reserved use of production effects.

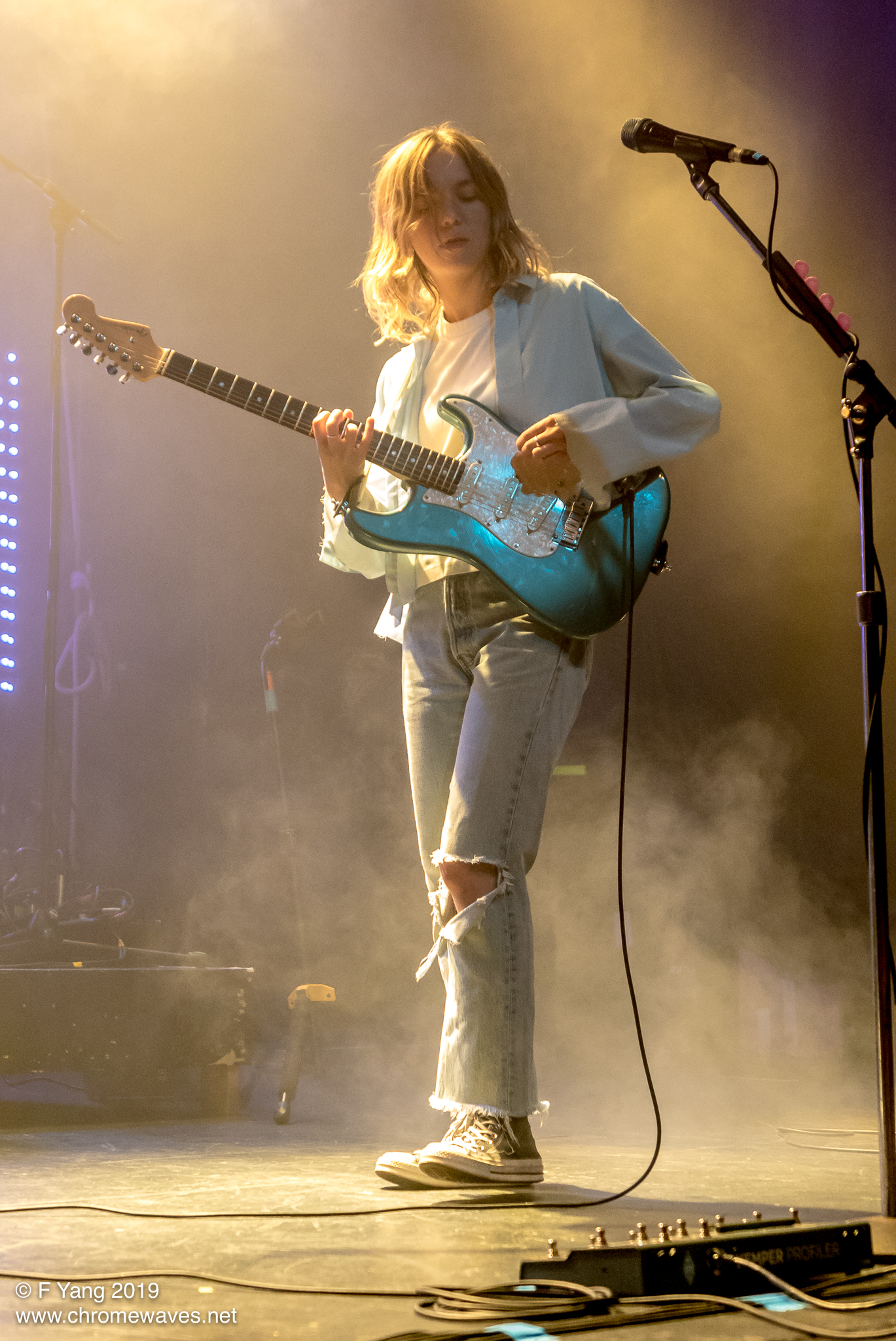
Bain on 27 October 2019 during her Good at Falling tour

=== 2018–2020: Good at Falling and Chewing Cotton Wool ===
Bain released the single "Lilo" on 27 September 2018. After the release of "Lilo", The Japanese House announced a North American tour in December 2019. On 12 November 2018 Bain released "Follow My Girl", the album's second single. That same day, Billboard announced that The Japanese House's debut album Good at Falling was to be released on 1 March 2019. The album was co-produced with George Daniel (of The 1975) and BJ Burton.

Upon its release, Good at Falling received mostly positive reviews. Megan Buerger of Pitchfork called it "confident and intoxicating", although she commented that its melancholic lyrical content almost exasperated her at points. Bain announced her second Good at Falling tour in the US for October and November 2019.

Bain released the EP The LA Sessions on 8 August 2019. The LA Sessions featured re-imagined tracks from Good at Falling and Saw You in a Dream which were recorded live in Los Angeles. On 27 September 2019, Bain released a single titled "Something Has to Change", and announced an upcoming extended play of the same name. The EP was announced to be released in November 2019, but was delayed into early 2020. On 22 November 2019, she released a single titled "Chewing Cotton Wool." On 10 August 2020, Bain announced that the EP, now titled Chewing Cotton Wool, was to be released on 12 August 2020. Bain released the EP on 12 August 2020. It featured four songs, one of which was a collaboration with Justin Vernon of indie folk band Bon Iver, as well as the previously released singles. Upon its release, Chewing Cotton Wool received praise for showing further growth of Bain's signature lush, hazy production, introducing more textured and sporadic electronics.

=== 2023–present: In the End It Always Does ===
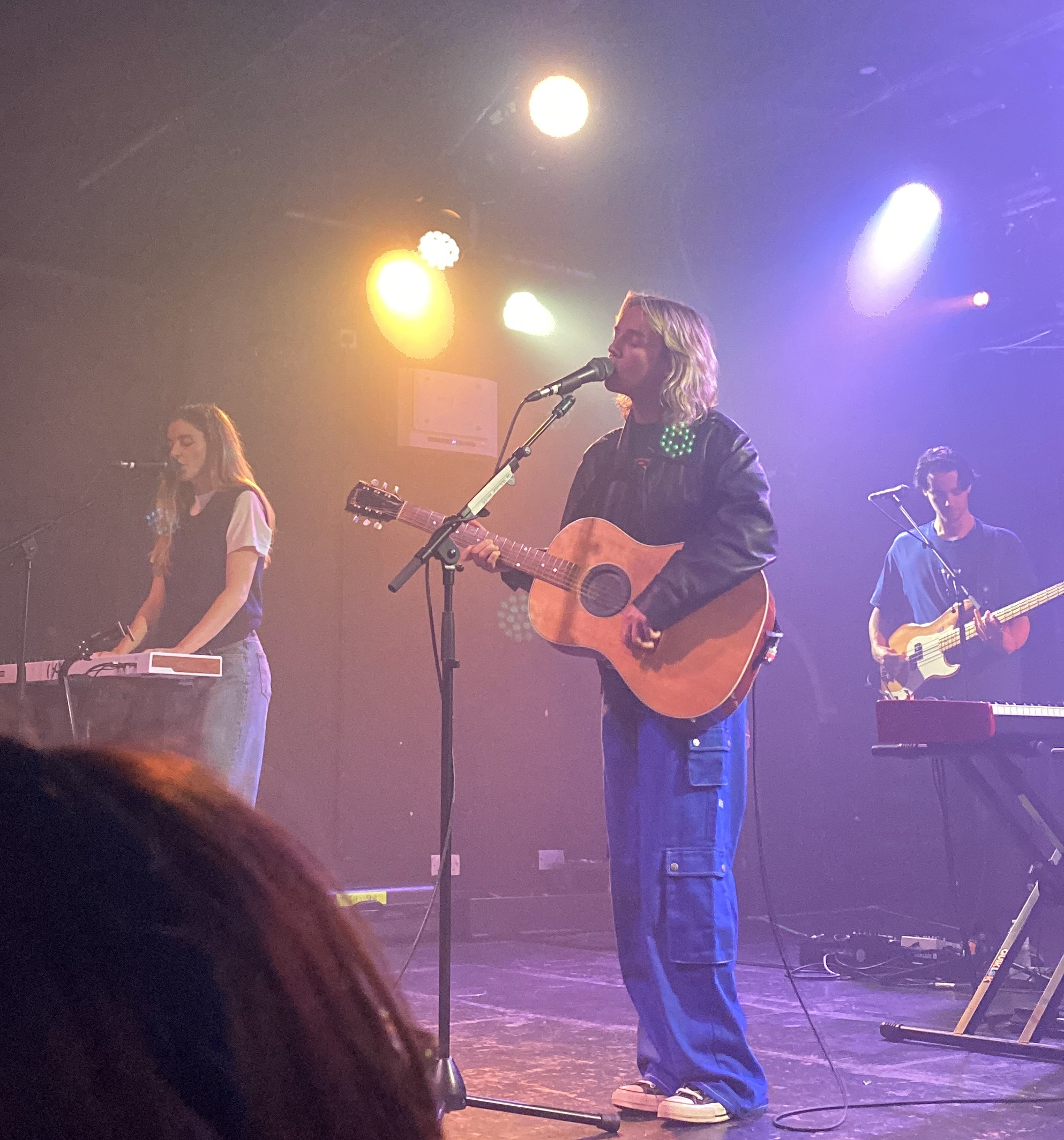
The Japanese House performing at the Trinity Centre, Bristol, during part of her 2023 UK Tour.

Bain released a new single on 20 March 2023, titled "Boyhood", the lead single to her second album In the End It Always Does. The album was announced on 18 April 2023, concurrent with the release of the second single "Sad to Breathe". In the End It Always Does was released on 30 June 2023, and was revealed to feature credits from previous collaborators George Daniel, Matty Healy, Justin Vernon, and new collaborators Charli XCX, Muna, Chloe Kraemer and more. In May 2023, Bain announced tours in North America and the United Kingdom.

On 12 January, it was announced Bain would join The 1975 for select dates on their 2024 UK tour.

In October 2024, a billboard themed after Charli XCX's highly anticipated remix album Brat and It's Completely Different but Also Still Brat was found in The Japanese House's hometown, London. After some speculations, it was officially revealed that The Japanese House would feature on the remixed version of the song "Apple". Bain went on to support Charli XCX on her 2025 international tour.

On 8 May 2025, it was announced that Bain would join Lorde for select dates on her 2025 Ultrasound World Tour.

Bain is scheduled to perform as the opening act for Gracie Abrams for four nights of The Look at My Life Tour in March 2027.

== Public image and anonymity ==
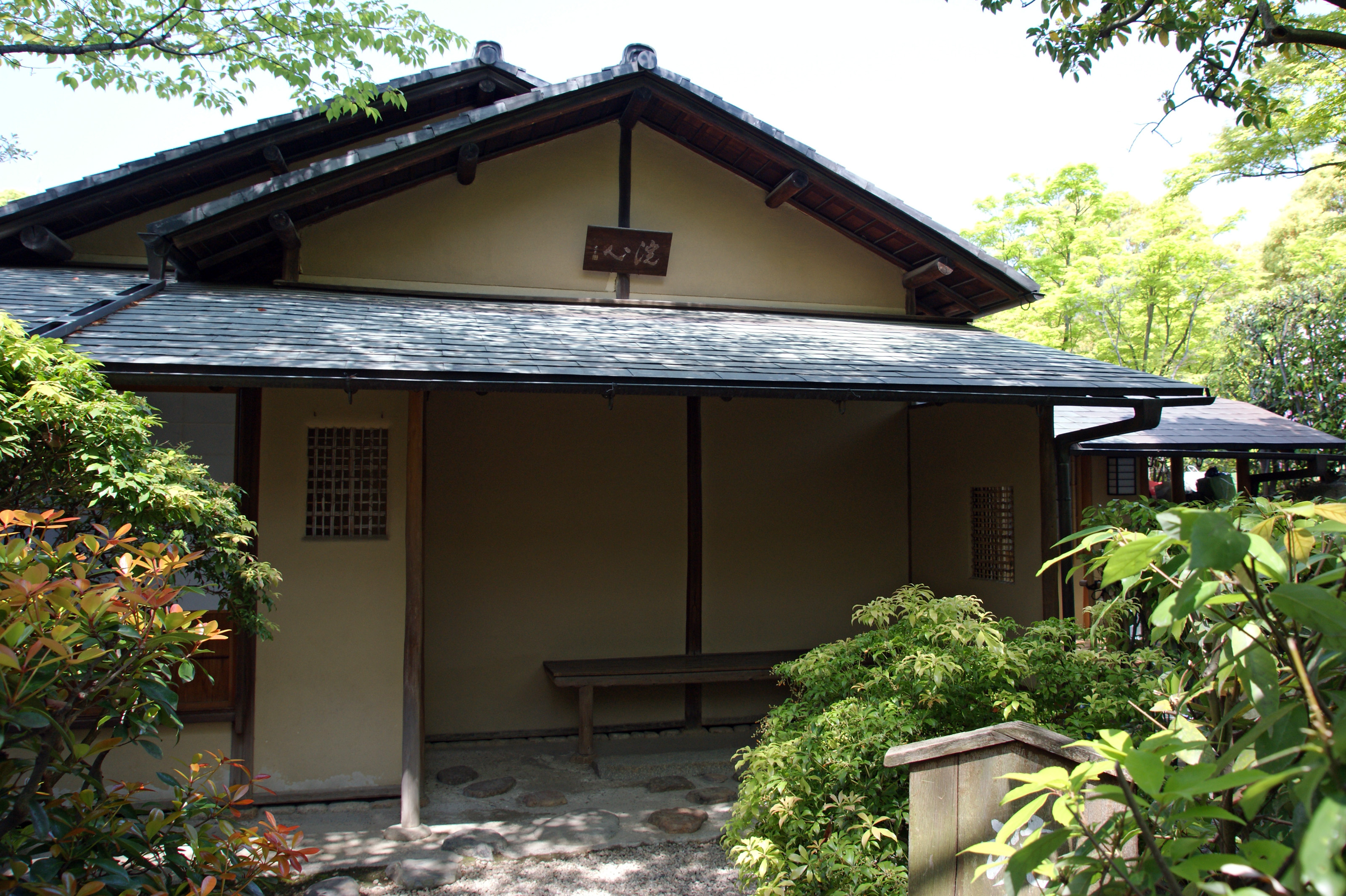
A traditional Japanese Tea House

Bain began producing music professionally under the pen name "The Japanese House". She has stated that her reasons for using a pseudonym include not wanting to be defined by her gender and wanting to avoid the public eye. The name "The Japanese House" was inspired by a cottage in Cornwall, England, in which she and her family had vacationed for a week during her childhood. The property had been previously owned by Kate Winslet, with furnishings reminiscent of traditional Japanese tea houses, and during her stay in Cornwall, Bain posed as a boy.

During her early career, Bain avoided photo shoots and publicity which, combined with her androgynous vocals, led many outlets to label her as an anonymous artist. After the release of her debut EP Pools to Bathe In, fans speculated about her gender and identity, with some even claiming that The Japanese House was Matty Healy of the 1975.

Despite the shroud of anonymity which surrounded The Japanese House, Bain never hid her personal identity online. In a 2019 interview, she noted that her official social media accounts even used her full name, Amber Bain. She eventually became more public, appearing in interviews and photo shoots, stating that the reason for this was that she had become more comfortable with being in the spotlight and "didn't want the mystery to become bigger than the music".

Bain is known for her androgynous style and wavy blond hair, the latter of which has been compared to that of American musician Kurt Cobain. Megan Buerger of Pitchfork described Bain at the beginning of her career as "a soft-spoken, queer 19-year-old girl with Kurt Cobain hair and boyish style".

== Artistry ==
=== Influences ===
Bain has been compared to pop acts with strong melodic styles such as the xx, the Beatles, and the Beach Boys. She has been compared to the 1975 with whom she has toured, particularly band members Matty Healy and George Daniel who helped produce many of her tracks. Bain has cited musicians like Brian Wilson, Blondie, Bon Iver, and Franki Valli & the Four Seasons as influences on her work. In a 2019 interview with W Magazine, she described herself as "a modern day, more depressing ABBA".

=== Musical style and themes ===
Pools to Bathe In was a synth-pop album, and her subsequent releases have prominently incorporated synth-pop. Her experimental musical style also contains dream pop, electropop, synth-pop, indie pop, and alt pop. Andy Meek of Billboard described Bain's discography as a combination of experimental electronica and "catchy pop hooks backed by drums and chugging guitars".

Her later releases were increasingly influenced by art pop and rock music. Saw You in a Dream was a yacht rock album, while Good at Falling was influenced by rock and art pop. She is known for her atmospheric tracks and moody lyrical themes. Max Migowksi, writing for Indie Mag, summarized Bain's musical style as "[an] androgynous voice embedded in ethereal, post-indie pop synths with hints at gentle acoustic guitar".

Many of Bain's releases explore themes such as love, loss, solitude, and personal growth. Her later releases have been favorably compared to her first two EPs, with critics noting the more mature lyrics and refined composition of Swim Against the Tide and Good at Falling. Bain's debut album Good at Falling was praised by its critics for its dark, heartfelt lyrics and light, pop melodies.

=== Voice ===
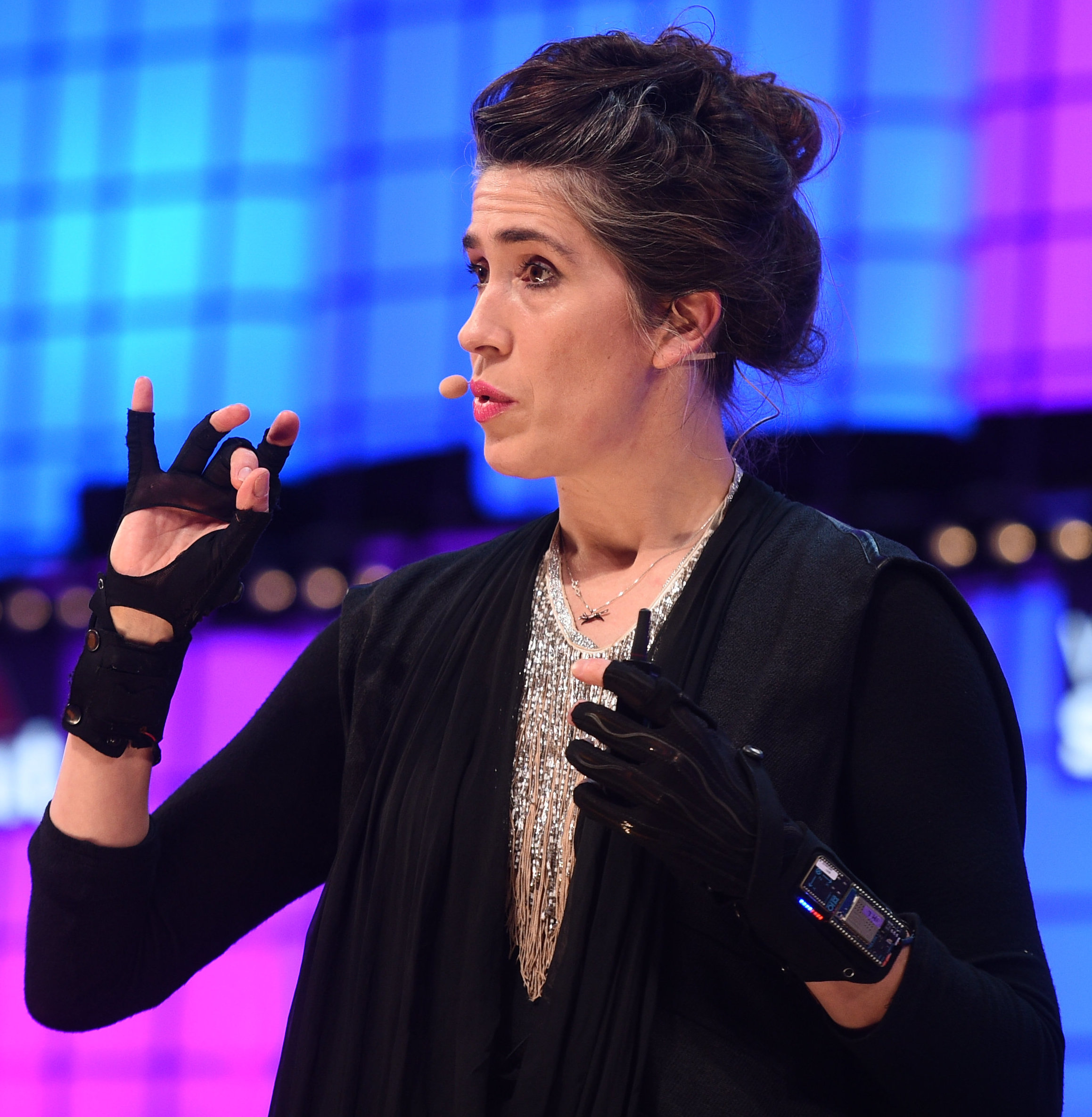
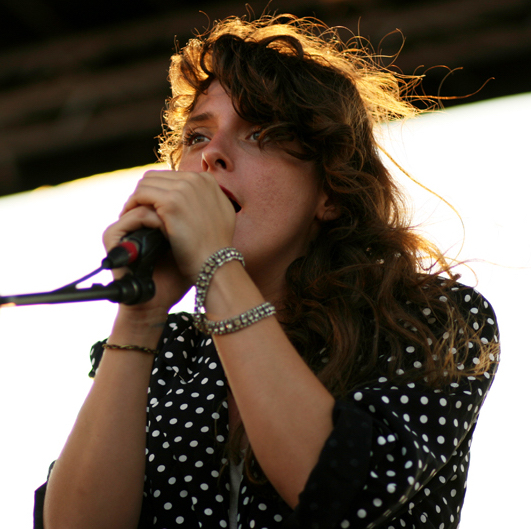
Bain's vocals are often compared to Imogen Heap (left) and Victoria Legrand (right).

Bain's singing vocal range extends from contralto to tenor and has been especially noted for its androgynous character. Critics have favorably compared her vocals to Victoria Legrand and Imogen Heap, though Bain rejects comparisons to Heap. A distinctive feature of Bain's discography is her use of layered harmonies, often three tracks or more, which simulates the effect of a vocoder. Her use of overlapping harmonies to create "a kind of thick, organic Auto-tune [sic]" has been praised for lending depth to her tracks. Alice French of Varsity called Bain's vocals one of the highlights of her performance.

== Personal life ==
At the time of a 2015 article, Bain resided in east London. Bain has a pet German Shepherd named Calvin and a Dachshund named Joni Jones after Joni Mitchell. She has been open about her struggle with alcohol abuse and stated that she became sober after the release of Good at Falling. The song "Maybe You're the Reason" from Good at Falling deals with her past struggles with an eating disorder, and this subject is also depicted in the music video for "Lilo".

Bain was in a four-year relationship with singer-songwriter Marika Hackman until 2018. Hackman later appeared in the music video for "Lilo". At the time of a 2019 interview with W Magazine, Bain stated that she was in a three-way polyamorous relationship with Polly Mackey, also known as Art School Girlfriend. As of 2023, Bain has been together with her partner, Alyssa. The couple announced their engagement on 2 April 2024. On 21 March 2025, Alyssa revealed the two had married.

Bain stated in 2020 that although she previously felt that being gay explained her gender expression, due to changing perceptions of sexuality, "maybe [she] would identify as nonbinary now, because [she doesn't] feel fully female."

In an interview with the Current recorded in 2023, Bain described her gender as fluid and stated a lack of preference for any particular gender pronoun set.

== Discography ==
=== Studio albums ===
Title	Details	Peak chart positions
Title	Details	UK
Good at Falling	Released: 1 March 2019; Label: Dirty Hit; Formats: CD, LP, digital download, cassette	64
In the End It Always Does	Released: 30 June 2023; Label: Dirty Hit; Formats: CD, LP, digital download, cassette	29

=== Extended plays ===
Title	Details	Notes
Pools to Bathe In	Released: 27 April 2015; Label: Dirty Hit; Formats: 12", digital download	
Clean	Released: 6 November 2015; Label: Dirty Hit; Formats: 12", digital download	
Swim Against the Tide	Released: 11 November 2016; Label: Dirty Hit; Formats: 12", digital download	
Saw You in a Dream	Released: 30 June 2017; Label: Dirty Hit; Formats: 12", digital download	
Spotify Singles	Released: 26 July 2017; Label: Dirty Hit; Format: Streaming	No. / Title / Length; 1. / "Face Like Thunder" (recorded at Spotify Studios NYC) / 4:14; 2. / "Landslide" (recorded at Spotify Studios NYC) / 3:53; Total length: / / 8:07
The LA Sessions	Released: 8 August 2019; Label: Dirty Hit; Format: Digital download	
Chewing Cotton Wool	Released: 12 August 2020; Label: Dirty Hit; Formats: 12", Digital download	No. / Title / Length; 1. / "Sharing Beds" / 1:49; 2. / "Something Has to Change" / 3:11; 3. / "Dionne" (featuring Justin Vernon) / 4:44; 4. / "Chewing Cotton Wool" / 3:29; Total length: / / 13:13
ITEIAD Sessions	Released: 22 November 2023; Label: Dirty Hit; Format: Digital download, LP	No. / Title / Length; 1. / "Sad to Breathe" (ITEIAD Sessions) / 3:57; 2. / "Touching Yourself" (ITEIAD Sessions) / 3:02; 3. / "Sunshine Baby" (ITEIAD Sessions) / 3:40; 4. / "Boyhood" (ITEIAD Sessions) / 3:02; 5. / "One for Sorrow, Two for Joni Jones" (ITEIAD Sessions) / 4:30; 6. / "Super Trouper" (ABBA cover) / 2:59; Total length: / / 21:11

=== Singles ===
Title	Year	Album
"Still"	2015	Pools to Bathe In
"Pools to Bathe In"	2015	Pools to Bathe In
"Teeth"	2015	Pools to Bathe In
"Sister"	2015	Pools to Bathe In
"Clean"	2015	Clean
"Cool Blue"	2015	Clean
"Letter by the Water"	2015	Clean
"Sugar Pill"	2015	Clean
"Face Like Thunder"	2016	Swim Against the Tide
"Swim Against the Tide"	2016	Swim Against the Tide
"Good Side In"	2016	Swim Against the Tide
"Saw You in a Dream"	2017	Saw You in a Dream
"Somebody You Found"	2017	Saw You in a Dream
"3/3"	2017	Saw You in a Dream
"Lilo"	2018	Good at Falling
"Follow My Girl"	2018	Good at Falling
"Maybe You're the Reason"	2019	Good at Falling
"We Talk All the Time"	2019	Good at Falling
"Something Has to Change"	2019	Chewing Cotton Wool
"Chewing Cotton Wool"	2019	Chewing Cotton Wool
"Boyhood"	2023	In the End It Always Does
"Sad to Breathe"	2023	In the End It Always Does
"Sunshine Baby"	2023	In the End It Always Does
"One for sorrow, two for Joni Jones"	2023	In the End It Always Does
":)"	2024	Non-album single

=== Music videos ===
Title	Year	Director	Ref.
"Clean"	2015	Juliet Bryant	
"Cool Blue"	2015	Juliet Bryant	
"Letter by the Water"	2015	Juliet Bryant	
"Sugar Pill"	2015	Juliet Bryant	
"Face Like Thunder"	2016	Gareth Phillips	
"Saw You in a Dream"	2017	Lucy Tcherniak	
"Lilo"	2018	David East	
"Maybe You're the Reason"	2019	Harvey Pearson	
"Something Has to Change"	2019	Nadira Amrani	
"Boyhood"	2023	Max Barnett	

== Awards ==
Year	Award	Nominee/ work	Category	Result
2024	Ivor Novello Award	Sunshine Baby	Best Song Musically and Lyrically	Nominated
