= Swim Against the Tide =

2016 EP by The Japanese House

EP by The Japanese House
- Released: 11 November 2016
- Genre: Experimental pop; dream pop; electro
- Length: 15:04
- Label: Dirty Hit
- Producer: Amber Bain; George Daniel

The Japanese House chronology
Clean (2015)	Swim Against the Tide (2016)	Saw You in a Dream (2017)

Swim Against the Tide is the third extended play by the English indie pop act The Japanese House, released on 11 November 2016 through Dirty Hit. The EP's first two songs—"Swim Against the Tide" and "Face Like Thunder"—were released as singles before the EP's release. The EP peaked at number 12 on Billboard's Heatseekers albums chart.

== Background ==
The EP's lead single "Face Like Thunder" was written before the release of The Japanese House's debut album Pools to Bathe In, and was adapted for inclusion in Swim Against the Tide. Bain has stated that the inspiration for EP's final track, titled "Leon", came from the 1994 French film Léon: The Professional, and is based on the perspective of Matilda, a character from the film, after she had grown up.

== Promotion ==
The EP's first single, "Face Like Thunder", was released the day after its premiere on Annie Mac's BBC Radio 1 show as the EP's lead single. "Swim Against the Tide", the EP's title track, was released as a single on 24 October 2016. "Good Side In", the final single from Swim Against the Tide was released on 31 October 2016 and premiered on Zane Lowe's "World Record" on Beats 1. The full EP was released on 11 November 2016.

== Musical style ==
The EP has been described as experimental pop, dream pop, techpop, electro, and '80s pop. The EP featured Bain's distinctive use of overlapping harmonies and synths, and some tracks featured experimentation with instruments such as steelpans.

== Reception ==
Professional ratings
Review scores
Source	Rating
DIY	4/5 stars
The Outline	9/10 stars
The Skinny	4/5 stars
Dork	5/5 stars

DIY gave the EP a positive review, awarding it 5 out of 5 stars, and stating that the lead single "Face Like Thunder" was "Amber [Bain]’s most chart-ready pop hook to date". Atwood Magazine noted that it was lighter and more upbeat than her previous releases but "just as introspective and raw as her previous two EPs". "Face Like Thunder", the EP's lead single, was the most commercially successful track from the EP and had steady airplay on BBC Radio 1.

== Track listing ==
No.	Title	Length
1.	"Swim Against the Tide"	3:41
2.	"Face Like Thunder"	3:58
3.	"Good Side In"	3:49
4.	"Leon"	3:45
Total length:		15:18

== Charts ==
Chart (2019)	Peak position
US Heatseekers Albums (Billboard)	12
