= Clean (The Japanese House EP) =

2015 EP by The Japanese House

EP by The Japanese House
- Released: 6 November 2015
- Genre: Indie pop; electronica; experimental
- Length: 15:52
- Label: Dirty Hit
- Producer: Amber Bain; George Daniel; Matty Healy

The Japanese House chronology
Pools to Bathe In (2015)	Clean (2015)	Swim Against the Tide (2016)

Clean is the second extended play by English indie pop act The Japanese House, released on 6 November 2015 through Dirty Hit. It is the second EP released, following their debut EP, Pools to Bathe In, released seven months prior.

Once again, all four songs from the EP were released as singles ahead of its release. Upon release, it received positive reviews from critics.

== Background ==
After the release of the electronica-based debut EP Pools to Bathe In, The Japanese House started to receive recognition for the experimental and organic composition of their music. Five months after its release, multi-instrumentalist and primary member Amber Bain premiered the title track on BBC Radio 1 with Zane Lowe, being the second song in Bain's discography to premiere after "Still" from her debut EP. She also announced the EP after its premiere.

The release of a second EP in 2015 — Clean — would mark of series of EPs that The Japanese House would release annually up into 2017, starting with Pools to Bathe In and continuing with Swim Against the Tide and Saw You in a Dream.

== Promotion ==
The EP's title track premiered on BBC Radio 1 on 7 September 2015 and was released subsequently as the lead single that day. "Cool Blue", as the second single, was released on 15 September. "Letter By The Water" was released on 27 October, before "Sugar Pill" was released three days before the EP.

== Musical style ==
The EP has been described as indie pop, electronica and experimental. It was also noted for its diversity, often contrasting the production of Pools to Bathe In.

== Reception ==
Professional ratings
Review scores
Source	Rating
Consequence of Sound	B
DIY	4/5 stars
Fortitude	10/10 stars

Clean received positive reviews from critics, who praised the musical direction of the EP and often noted Bain's vocal performance. Jamie Milton, reviewing for DIY, stated that "it's still small steps for Amber Bain, but as The Japanese House, she’s bit-by-bit establishing herself as a pop force like no other." Praising the EP's themes and composition, Fortitude concluded that "each listen unveiling a new worn edge hidden in the spaces between Bain's lyrics and the music’s richly produced landscapes." Sasha Geffen of Consequence of Sound remarked that "the songwriting and its packaging reinforce each other", all the while positively concluding that "Bain might not yet have built enough of a platform to support the weight of her project’s nascent popularity, but Clean at least proves that she’s got the resources necessary to carry that spark of curiosity over into real fandom."

== Track listing ==
No.	Title	Length
1.	"Clean"	5:00
2.	"Cool Blue"	3:50
3.	"Letter by the Water"	3:28
4.	"Sugar Pill"	3:24
Total length:		15:52

== Charts ==
Chart (2019)	Peak position
US Heatseekers Albums (Billboard)	13
