= Pools to Bathe In =

2015 EP by The Japanese House

EP by The Japanese House
- Released: 27 April 2015
- Genre: Electropop; experimental; folk
- Length: 15:18
- Label: Dirty Hit
- Producer: Amber Bain; Matthew Healy; George Daniel

The Japanese House chronology
Pools to Bathe In (2015)	Clean (2015)

Pools to Bathe In is the debut extended play by the English indie pop act The Japanese House, released on 27 April 2015 through Dirty Hit. All four songs—"Still", "Pools to Bathe In", "Teeth" and "Sister"—were released as singles before the EP's release. The album was produced by The Japanese House alongside The 1975 band members Matty Healy and George Daniel.

== Background ==
At the time "Still" premiered on BBC Radio 1 with Zane Lowe on 2 March 2015, corresponding with its release as The Japanese House's debut single, very little was known about The Japanese House; specifically, Amber Bain herself. It was dubbed Lowe's "Hottest Record" on the show and Pools to Bathe In was announced for a release date of 27 April.

== Promotion ==
The EP's third track, "Still", was released a day after its premiere on BBC Radio 1 on SoundCloud as the EP's lead single and The Japanese House's debut single. The title track was released on 25 March as the second single. "Teeth" was released as the third single on 8 April before finishing with "Sister" on 22 April.

== Musical style ==
The EP has been mostly described as electropop, folk and experimental.

== Track listing ==
No.	Title	Length
1.	"Pools to Bathe In"	4:20
2.	"Teeth"	3:56
3.	"Still"	3:18
4.	"Sister"	3:44
Total length:		15:18
