= Notes on a Conditional Form =

2020 studio album by the 1975

- Standard cover for physical releases

Studio album by the 1975
- Released: 22 May 2020
- Recorded: August 2018 – February 2020
- Studios: Abbey Road (London, England); Angelic (Halse, England); British Grove (London); Conway (Los Angeles, California); EastWest (Los Angeles); Lush (Brisbane, Australia); E8 Hackney (London); Nightbird (Los Angeles); Perfect Sound (Los Angeles); RAK (London); Sleeper Sounds (London); Sony (Sydney, Australia); Storm Trooper Tour Bus (U.S.); Strongroom (London); The Church (London); TIC (Vienna, Austria)
- Genres: Rock; pop; electronic; experimental
- Length: 80:29
- Labels: Dirty Hit; Polydor
- Producers: Matthew Healy; George Daniel; Jonathan Gilmore

The 1975 chronology
A Brief Inquiry into Online Relationships (2018)	Notes on a Conditional Form (2020)	Being Funny in a Foreign Language (2022)

Alternative cover
- Digital-only cover

Singles from Notes on a Conditional Form
- 1. "People" Released: 22 August 2019; 2. "Frail State of Mind" Released: 24 October 2019; 3. "Me & You Together Song" Released: 16 January 2020; 4. "The Birthday Party" Released: 19 February 2020; 5. "Jesus Christ 2005 God Bless America" Released: 3 April 2020; 6. "If You're Too Shy (Let Me Know)" Released: 23 April 2020; 7. "Guys" Released: 13 May 2020

Notes on a Conditional Form is the fourth studio album by English band the 1975. It was released on 22 May 2020 by Dirty Hit and Polydor Records. Initially titled Music for Cars, the album was intended as the follow-up to I Like It When You Sleep, for You Are So Beautiful yet So Unaware of It (2016). It later came to denote an era spanning two albums. The first, A Brief Inquiry into Online Relationships, was released in November 2018. The band recorded much of the second album in London, Los Angeles, Sydney, Northamptonshire and in a mobile studio on their tour bus. The album faced several delays and was submitted only weeks before the onset of the global COVID-19 pandemic.

A maximalist experimental album, Notes on a Conditional Form has a free-flowing structure composed of conventional songs, classical orchestral interludes and ambient electronic instrumentals. The album contains loose song structures characterised by their stream of consciousness deliveries, neo-noir ambience, downcast string arrangements, melancholic orchestral flourishes and sudden contrasts. Guest contributors to the album include Phoebe Bridgers, FKA Twigs, Cutty Ranks, climate change activist Greta Thunberg, and Matty Healy's father, Tim.

Notes on a Conditional Form incorporates numerous genres, combining house, UK garage and various electronic music subgenres with guitar-based acoustic folk, emo, country and multiple rock music subgenres. Thematically, the album focuses on the intricacies of human existence and uses introspection, retrospection, self-reflection and straightforward storytelling. It explores themes of isolation, uncertainty and anxiety, inspired by the 2017 documentary Joan Didion: The Center Will Not Hold and Bruce Springsteen's 1982 album Nebraska. The album's lyrics provide a deconstruction of Healy's extroverted persona, with several reviewers regarding it as the 1975's most personal record.

Prior to the album's debut, the band released "The 1975" and the singles "People", "Frail State of Mind", "Me & You Together Song", "The Birthday Party", "Jesus Christ 2005 God Bless America", "If You're Too Shy (Let Me Know)" and "Guys". A North American leg of the band's Music for Cars Tour, planned in support of the album, was cancelled several months prior to the record's debut. An online art exhibition entitled Artists Respond to NOACF, featuring music videos created by various artists, was released in its place. The album debuted atop the UK Albums Chart and reached number one in Australia and Scotland. Elsewhere, it peaked within the top five in Ireland, New Zealand and the United States, and the top 20 in Canada and Japan. The album polarised contemporary music critics; some lauded it as the band's magnum opus, while others derided it as confusing, chaotic and directionless. Despite this, the album appeared on numerous year-end lists and was hailed as the best release of 2020 by The Music.

== Background and release ==
The 1975 released their second studio album, I Like It When You Sleep, for You Are So Beautiful yet So Unaware of It, in February 2016. The record peaked atop the UK Albums Chart and the US Billboard 200 and was considered by numerous critics to be one of the best albums of 2016. In February 2017, lead singer Matthew Healy tweeted: "Music for Cars – 2018". In an April interview on Zane Lowe's Beats 1 Radio show, the singer confirmed the title Music for Cars and announced a 2018 release, saying "[the album] has always been called that, and we were always gonna do a trilogy of records". He later told Tom Connick of NME that the title was a reference to the band's third extended play of the same name (2013), saying it "was always my favorite title of everything we'd ever done". With Music For Cars, the singer aimed to create the most important pop album of the decade, hoping to achieve the same impact as Radiohead's OK Computer (1997) and the Smiths' The Queen Is Dead (1986).

In August 2017, the 1975 stated they were in the editing process of Music for Cars, having over two hours worth of material. Healy also revealed the name of a new song, "Jesus Christ 2005 God Bless America" (2020), while the band's manager Jamie Oborne said the first recording sessions for the album were planned for September. Posters promoting the album began emerging around London and Manchester in April 2018. In May, the 1975 announced that Music for Cars would now serve as an umbrella term to denote an "era" comprising two albums. Regarding the decision to release two separate bodies of work rather than a double album, Healy called the double album format "prog and annoying ... they're self-serving".

The first part of the Music for Cars era, A Brief Inquiry into Online Relationships, was released on 30 November 2018. It received widespread critical acclaim and won British Album of the Year at the 2019 Brit Awards. Although Healy sought to release the second album in May 2019, Notes on a Conditional Form became available for pre-order on Apple Music shortly after the song "The 1975" appeared in July 2019, with an expected album release date of 21 February 2020. The official artwork was also unveiled, featuring a yellow stripe and the album's title written in various languages. The release date was later moved to 24 April as a result of vinyl production issues, before being delayed again to 22 May. A revised album cover was also revealed, featuring the album's name, the band's name and the phrase "Music for Cars" on the top, while the initials of Notes on a Conditional Form are featured in the upper-right corner. The former artwork would only be used for the digital version. Regarding the multiple delays, Healy said they were caused by giving interviewers arbitrary release dates. Ultimately, Notes on a Conditional Form was released on 22 May 2020.

== Recording and production ==
The recording of Notes on a Conditional Form took place over 19 months in 15 different studios, spanning four countries. The 1975 began writing the album during the same period as A Brief Inquiry into Online Relationships and continued throughout 2019 during their Music for Cars Tour. Most of the album's electronic elements were created in a mobile studio within their retrofitted tour bus, while the guitars and vocals were recorded between tour dates. The band's guitarist Adam Hann told Gregory Adams of Guitar World that it proved challenging to record and tour simultaneously, saying it was difficult switching between the bus and studio. From around late July, the band spent four months recording in Los Angeles. After returning to the UK, they took up residence at the Angelic Residential Recording Studio in Northamptonshire for "super extended" sessions. These sessions resulted in what Healy described as "the first record ... that's just us in a room". The final recording sessions took place in the basement of their record label's office in Sydney, Australia, while the band toured Australasia. Ultimately, the 1975 submitted the album only weeks before the COVID-19 pandemic overtook the world.

"Having No Head"
A 30-second sample of "Having No Head". Healy and Daniel were inspired by the work of virtuoso pianist Frédéric Chopin and wanted to incorporate a piano into an ambient piece, resulting in the song's creation.

The 1975 designed Notes on a Conditional Form as an experimental album meant to represent dance music in the UK, taking inspiration from the British club scene, Burial, the Streets and Brian Eno. Healy guided the album's creative direction, working closely with the band's primary producer and drummer, George Daniel, on all aspects of songwriting. Healy described their working relationship a symbiotic creative partnership built on a "shared musical vocabulary". During the album's recording, he focused on multiple loosely defined ideas simultaneously, while Daniel had a detail-oriented approach. The pair created most of the record's songs as rough ideas; Healy used a guitar or piano, while Daniel programmed snippets on his computer. After creating an instrumental, the former would then add the lyrics. The pair often listened to music for inspiration, analysing a song to identify the "vibes" they sought to emulate. Using "Having No Head" as an example, Healy told Ryan Dombal of Pitchfork that the song began after they listened to virtuoso pianist Frédéric Chopin. It sparked a conversation about the band's love for pianos in ambient music, which led to the creation of "Having No Head".

Collaborators on Notes on a Conditional Form

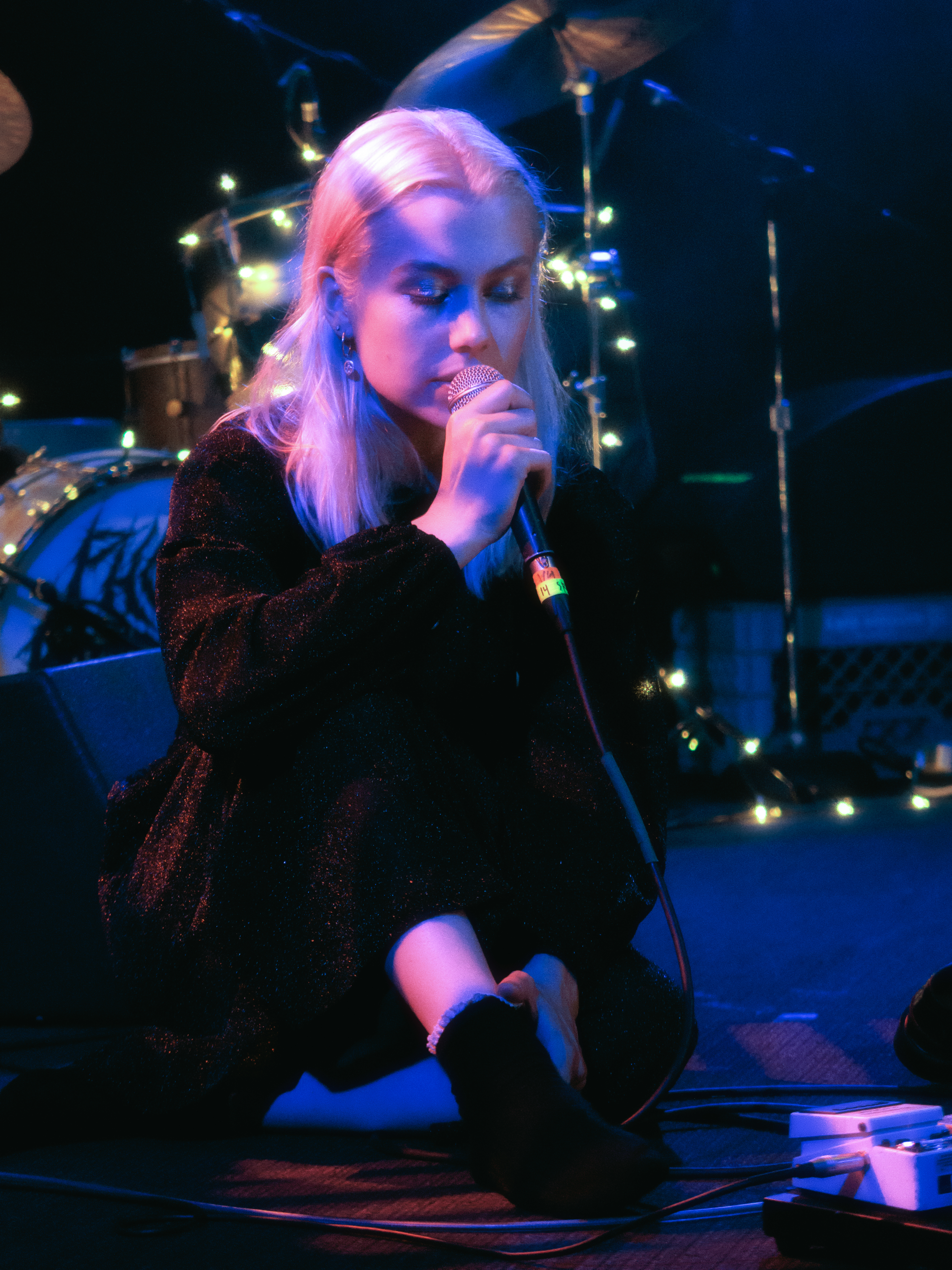
Contributing to four songs, Phoebe Bridgers is the most prominent collaborator on the album.

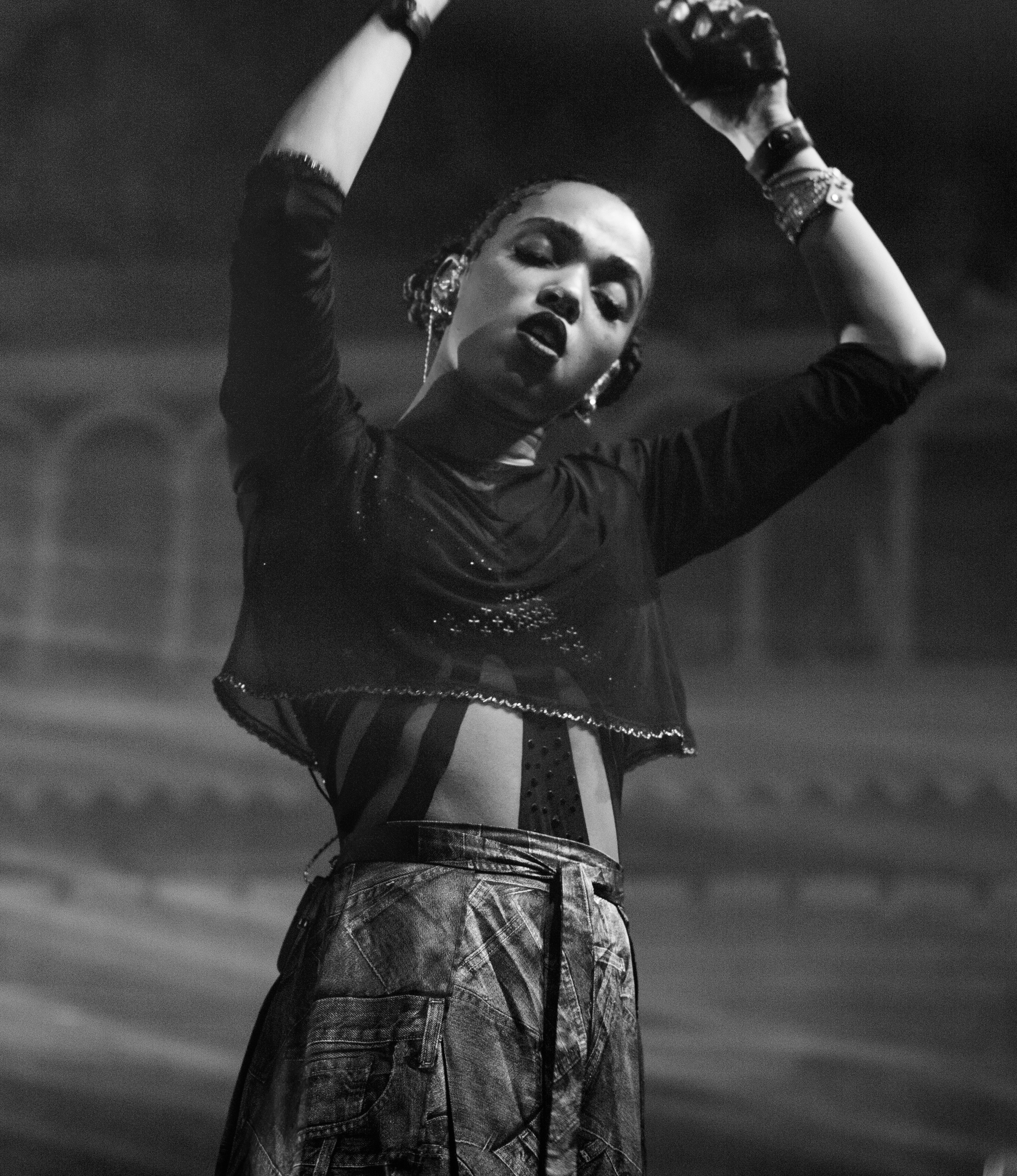
FKA Twigs lends her operatic vocals to "If You're Too Shy (Let Me Know)" and "What Should I Say".

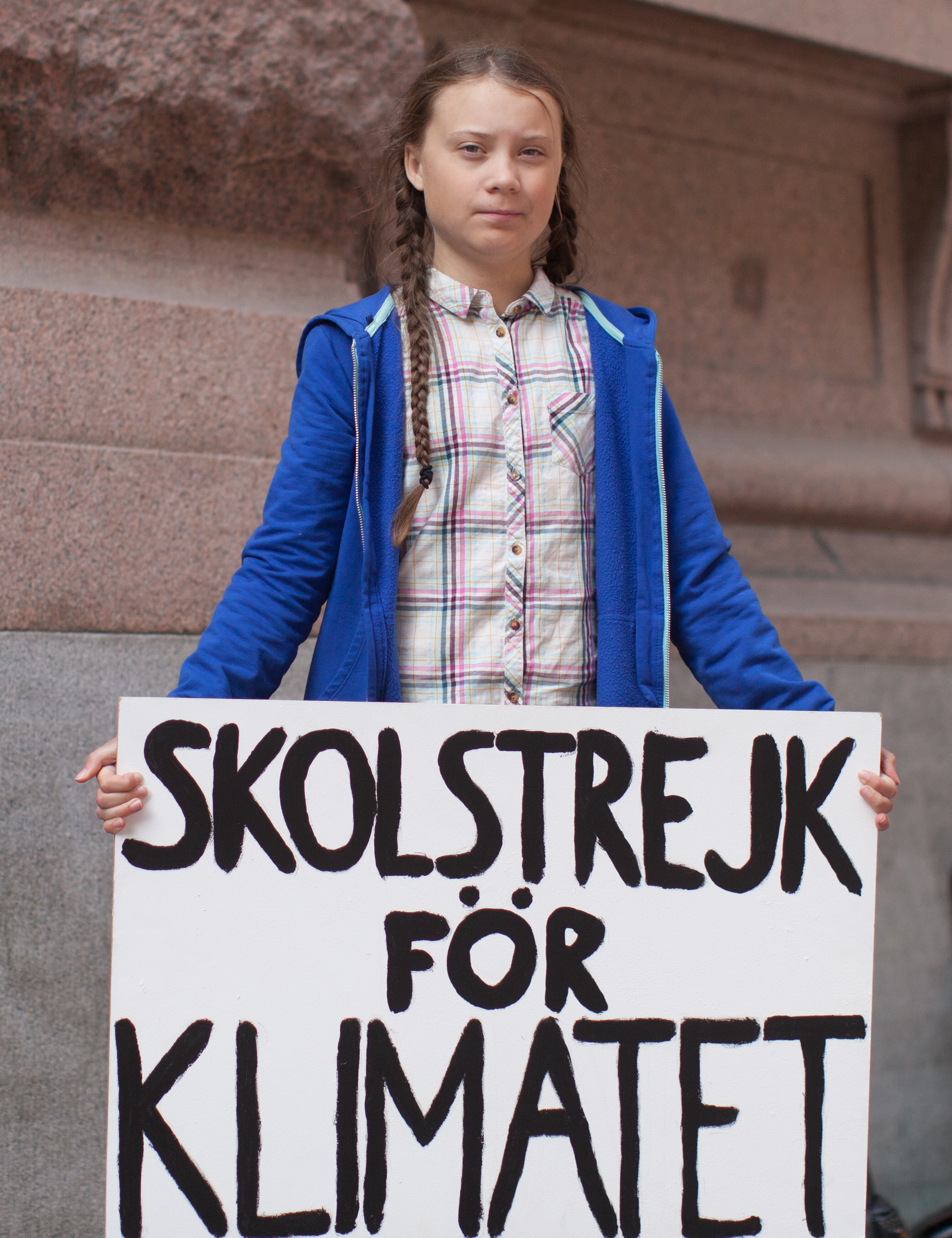
Teenage activist Greta Thunberg gives a climate change speech on "The 1975".

Notes on a Conditional Form is more collaborative than the 1975's previous albums. Healy said the prior omittance of other vocalists came from his dislike of the modern culture of features, feeling they were too commercialised and lacked authenticity. Speaking on the album's vocal collaborators, he said: "I think there's an authenticity to the collaboration[s] on this record because it came from nothing but friendship and excitement of music." Swedish teenage activist Greta Thunberg provides a speech on climate change in "The 1975", Cutty Ranks is the sole vocalist on "Shiny Collarbone", FKA Twigs provides introductory vocals on "If You're Too Shy (Let Me Know)" and additional vocals on "What Should I Say", and Tim Healy duets with his son on "Don't Worry".

Phoebe Bridgers represents the most prominent collaborator on Notes on a Conditional Form, contributing to four songs. Healy exchanged messages with Bridgers, a longtime fan of the 1975, and they began talking about each other's music. Daniel invited the singer and Marshall Vore, her drummer, to hangout while the band were in Los Angeles. She later became "inherently" part of the album, described by Healy as adding a "country-emo Americana" element. Healy said that he did not experience his usual collaboration-related anxiety when working with Bridgers, describing it as akin to playing an instrument. She recorded a solo version of "Jesus Christ 2005 God Bless America", which impressed Healy enough for him to ask her to record harmonies for other songs. She later travelled to England to record "Then Because She Goes", "Roadkill" and "Playing on My Mind", telling Salvatore Maicki of The Fader: "I love their turnaround time, it's fucking great. That's, like, true punk rock."

== Music and structure ==
Notes on a Conditional Form is a sonically experimental album that explores an expansive array of genres, incorporating sounds, styles and textures extrapolated from a diverse set of scenes and eras. Growing comfortable with their identity, the 1975 incorporated ideas from a planned electronic album into the record, extensively utilising house music and UK garage. Brenton Blanchet of Clash said Notes on a Conditional Form serves to "cement [the 1975] as genre shapeshifters", building upon the experimentation of their third studio album. Matt Collar of AllMusic shared this sentiment and commented that it continues the "self-aware, implicitly obvious" experimentation of its predecessor. Lindsay Zoladz of The New York Times said the record disregards traditional album structures, calling it a "collection of peaks and valleys". For this reason, Mitch Mosk of Atwood Magazine said the album traverses "lush valleys" of ambience and "stirring peaks" of intimacy, ultimately deeming it genreless. His colleague Ben Niesen echoed these statements, deeming it "less of a record and more of a portfolio".

"Roadkill"
The impact of modern country music–a genre not explored by the 1975 before–influenced the album's chord shapes and Healy's vocals on several songs, including "Roadkill".

Ali Shutler and Stephen Ackroyd of Dork observed two distinct stylistic threads throughout Notes on a Conditional Form. The first is acoustic-driven alternative rock, folk and country music, while the second is British "nighttime" music. Similarly, Andrew Sacher of BrooklynVegan said it combines electronic music and guitar-oriented subgenres, which Clair Biddles from The Line of Best Fit identified as indie rock. While Larry Fitzmaurice of Entertainment Weekly said it is connected by electronic pop and dance music, Brendan Wetmore of Paper argued that Notes on a Conditional Form wasn't a dance record "in any traditional or modern sense", noting it was characterised by its use of house music. Additionally, the album combines ambient music, synth-pop, techno, indie-pop, folk, art rock, nu metal, jungle, Britpop, lo-fi house, rock, emocore and two-step. Unlike the 1975's previous releases, the album is heavily informed by modern country music, which influences the album's chord shapes and Healy's vocal performance. Healy told Brittany Spanos of Rolling Stone that it was rare for him to hear country music growing up, shaping his view of it as "kind of exotic and pioneering."

Notes on a Conditional Form has a free-flowing maximalist structure composed of traditional songs, instrumental tracks and interludes, while orchestral pieces and ambient electronic explorations provide the album's "connective tissue". It features loose, winding stream of consciousness song structures that alternate between moments of disorder and "rigid flow"; serving as a contrast to its "tighter, more calculated" predecessor. The songs espouse neo-noir ambience, characterised by downcast, anxious string arrangements, sonic rhymes, sudden contrasts, electronic pulses, pensive acoustic guitars, and melancholic orchestral flourishes. Reflecting the band's house music influences, Daniel "[buries] and [blares] house's most beloved tropes" such as pitch-shifting nodes, shuffling UK garage beats, pounding drums, splintering strains of UK bass, electronic drum patterns, and distorted sampling techniques.

== Themes and lyrics ==
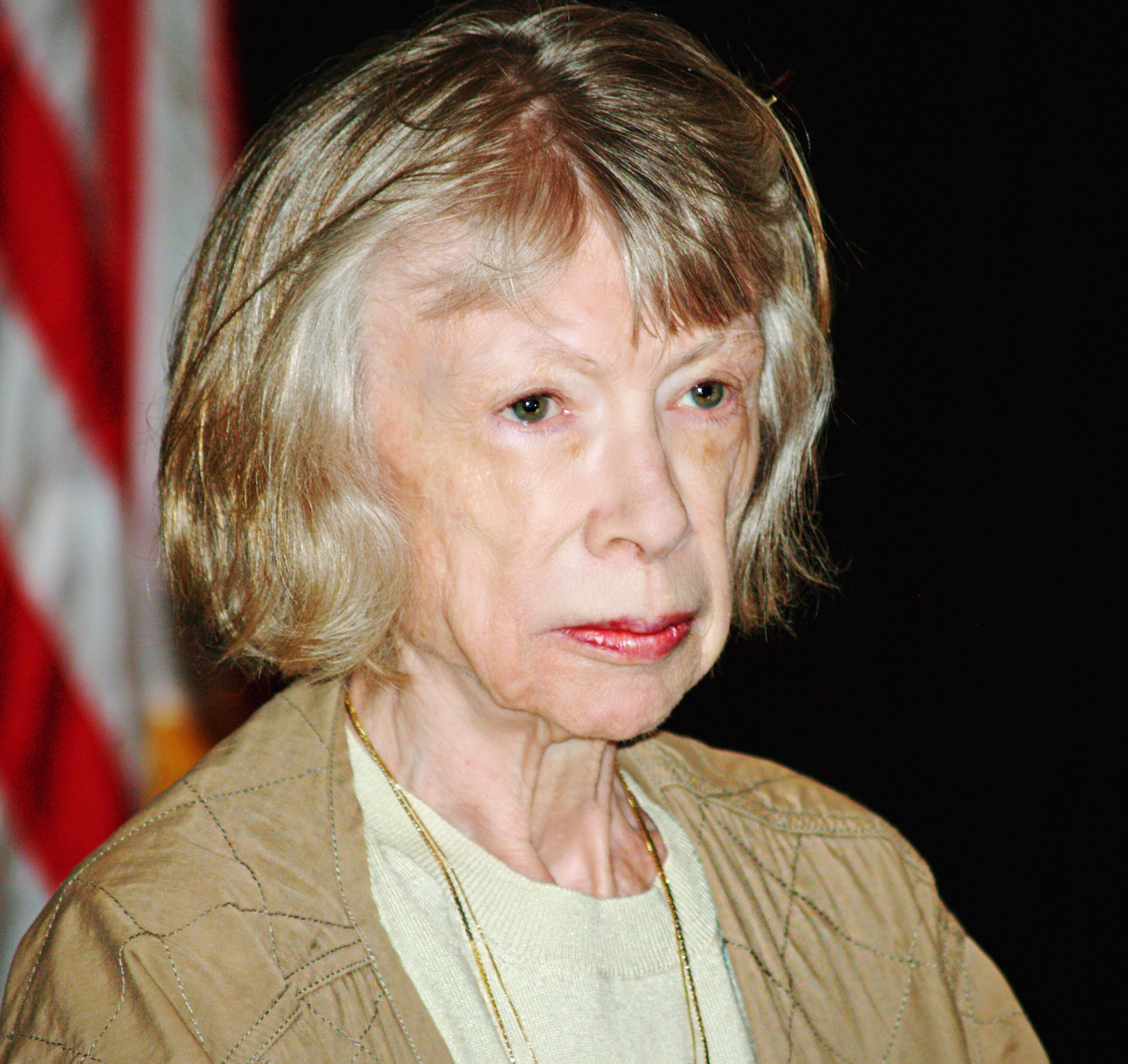
Joan Didion, specifically her documentary The Center Will Not Hold (2017), served as a major thematic influence on the album.

Notes on a Conditional Form is centred around the intricacies of human existence. It narrates the highs and lows of the human experience, with Samantha Small of Consequence of Sound calling it "the most painstakingly human album in their repertoire". The album uses straightforward storytelling and self-reflection to express the band's personal philosophies, ruminating on self-discovery and the meaning of life. It focuses on the challenges of modern life, specifically technology, depression, intimacy, life and death. The singer noted that the album is driven by the question: "Can the centre hold?" It stems from the Joan Didion documentary The Center Will Not Hold (2017), which Healy watched while in rehab. The singer commented that Didion's work, particularly her essay collection Slouching Towards Bethlehem (1968), significantly impacted the album. Applied to the overall theme of the record, Healy said: "Can the centre hold with all of this shit? Politically, economically, climate-wise – it feels like we're getting under a lot of pressure."

According to Healy, Notes on a Conditional Form represents his search for the definitive answers to life, saying it is about inherent and universal feelings but ultimately is "really just about [himself]"; his fears, desires and loves. The lyrics explore drug addiction, touring, atheism, love, politics and the fallibility of the 1975's own writing. The singer projects topics that are "fatalistic, romantic, and tissue-thin in their sensitivity", writing about establishing and navigating personal connections in the online world, the nuances of "messy" relationships, facing challenges without resorting to substance abuse, self-medication, and confronting feelings of apathy and powerlessness. The lyrics express generational resonation, exploring themes of youth and romance while presenting "half existential questions that mock themselves with self-aware humour".

Notes on a Conditional Form is explicated by introspection, exploring Healy's feelings of isolation, uncertainty and anxiety. Unlike on the 1975's previous albums, he uses retrospection to look back on his life and career, drawing inspiration from that. Healy sought to reflect on the choices he has made, wanting to create a "snapshot in time" similar to Bruce Springsteen's Nebraska (1982), focusing on themes of domesticity and mental health. Dan Stubbs of NME said the pervading theme of the album was Healy's role as a "kind of Man Who Fell To Earth figure, askew from the world he finds himself in, sometimes amused, sometimes bemused", Zoladz noted that it is markedly more introverted, a shift from outward extroversion seen on the band's previous albums. The theme of anxiety represents a reoccurring topic throughout the album, dealing with apprehensiveness towards life, love, marriage, starting a family and ageing. Paul Schrodt of Slant Magazine said Healy was unable to hide behind his "ironic postmodernist guise", focusing instead on deconstructing his mythology and letting "his ambition and sincerity openly roam, sitting uncomfortably alongside more familiar sides of his personality." Conrad Duncan of Under the Radar commented that the album was a reflective and "oddly sober" re-evaluation of Healy's persona, attempting to find what comes after commercial success and critical acclaim when "old flaws and insecurities resurface".

== Songs ==
"The 1975", an ambient spoken-word protest song, opens Notes on a Conditional Form. Thunberg delivers a monologue based on the January 2019 speech "Our House Is on Fire", which she gave at the World Economic Forum. Her inclusion stemmed from the 1975 wanting: "[Her voice] to be documented in a formal place in pop culture." It immediately transitions into "People", an anarcho-punk and screamo protest song that promotes change and rebellion as Healy encourages listeners to "wake up". "The End (Music for Cars)" is an ambient orchestral instrumental that reworks "HNSCC" from Music for Cars. It is followed by "Frail State of Mind", an experimental UK garage and electronica ballad, meant to represent a collective global anxiety attack. "Streaming", the album's second instrumental, leads directly into "The Birthday Party", an acoustic-driven folk and country ballad. The song is told through the perspective of Healy at a house party, recounting a series of awkward and uninteresting encounters he has with its various guests. "Yeah I Know" is an experimental electronic, UK garage and ambient song that contains influences of glitch, IDM and garage rock.

"I Think There's Something You Should Know"
Healy wrote "I Think There's Something You Should Know" as a continuation of "Somebody Else" (2016).

"Then Because She Goes", an experimental shoegaze, alternative rock and dream pop song, has an unconventional song structure, background vocals from Bridgers and elements of post-grunge. Bridgers contributes a verse to "Jesus Christ 2005 God Bless America" and background vocals on "Roadkill", an upbeat alternative rock and country song; it draws influence from country rock, Americana, country pop, indie pop and folk music. "Me & You Together Song" is a dream pop and pop rock song. A majority of "I Think There's Something You Should Know" is an instrumental, composed in the styles of house, dubstep and future garage, and it contains an electropop breakdown one minute into its run.

"What Should I Say"
"What Should I Say" was initially created for the 1975's previous album.

The 13th song on Notes on a Conditional Form, "Nothing Revealed / Everything Denied", explores Healy's search for truth and is a neo soul, electro-gospel and R&B song. "Tonight (I Wish I Was Your Boy)", an alternative R&B and neo soul song, uses a sample of the Temptations' "Just My Imagination (Running Away with Me)". "Shiny Collarbone" is an instrumental deep house, dancehall and house interlude performed by Ranks. FKA Twigs provides the introductory vocals on "If You're Too Shy (Let Me Know)", a 1980s-style pop and synth-pop song. Featuring Bridgers' background vocals, "Playing on My Mind" is an Americana-influenced indie pop and acoustic song. "Having No Head" is a propulsive IDM, microhouse and UK garage instrumental. FKA Twigs provides background vocals on "What Should I Say", a deep house, dance-pop and house song, which is the oldest track on Notes on a Conditional Form. "Bagsy Not in Net" is an experimental interlude and was the last song recorded for Notes on a Conditional Form. "Don't Worry" is an ambient and indie pop ballad with additional vocals from Tim Healy. The album's final song, "Guys", was written as an answer song to the 1975's "Girls" (2013) and is a mid-tempo indie rock and pop rock ballad.

== Promotion ==
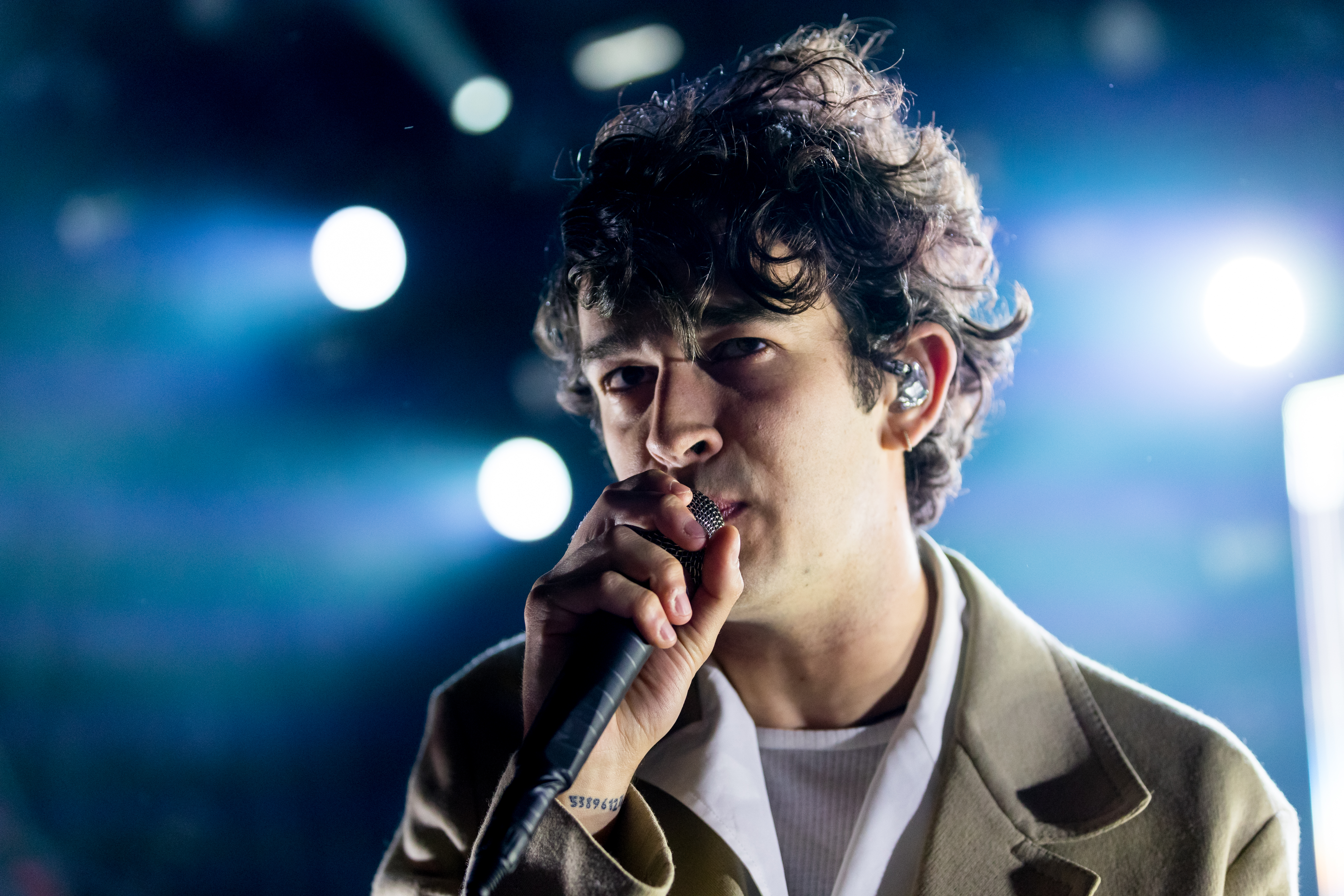
Healy performing at Rock am Ring in Nürburgring, Germany in 2019.

On 23 July 2019, the 1975 temporarily deactivated their social media accounts, repeating a precedent set with their previous two albums that signifies the release of new music. "The 1975" was released the following day as the first preview from Notes on a Conditional Form. On 22 August, the band released "People" as the lead single from the album. It received positive reviews, although the response from the band's fanbase was comparatively more mixed. A music video directed by Healy, Warren Fu and Ben Ditto was released the same day. A countdown on the 1975's social media accounts lead to the release of the album's second single, "Frail State of Mind", on 24 October. The song's accompanying visual, directed by Healy, Patricia Villirillo and Mara Palena, was released on 21 November. Healy announced through his Instagram that "Me & You Together Song" would be released on 16 January 2020 as the third single from Notes on a Conditional Form. On the day of the song's official release, the 1975 performed "Me & You Together Song" on the BBC Radio 1 show Annie Mac's Hottest Record in the World. Its music video, directed by Bedroom, was released on 6 February.

On 18 February 2020, the 1975 announced on Twitter that "The Birthday Party", the fourth single from Notes on a Conditional Form, would debut live on Lowe's Beats 1 Radio show at 5 PM the next day, followed by the music video one hour later. On 31 March, the 1975 announced that "Jesus Christ 2005 God Bless America" would be released as the album's fifth single on 3 April. The song was uploaded to the band's official YouTube channel one day early. "If You're Too Shy (Let Me Know)" was released the sixth single from the album on 23 April. It was met with critical acclaim and appeared on numerous year-end lists, with Scott Lapatine of Stereogum and Edwin Ortiz of Complex deeming it the best song of 2020. A commercial success, it became the band's highest-charting single to date in the United Kingdom, surpassing "The Sound". A black and white music video for the song was released the same day to promote the track. "Guys" was released as the seventh and final single from the album on 13 May 2020, while its accompanying visual was released on 21 May 2020.

To further promote Notes on a Conditional Form, the 1975 planned to embark on the second half of the Music for Cars Tour, which began in November 2018 to support A Brief Inquiry into Online Relationships. The tour was postponed on 18 March 2020 due to the COVID-19 pandemic, and the band issued a statement apologising to attendees, requesting they retain their tickets for use once the tour resumed. On 12 January 2021, the 1975 decided to cancel the tour, noting the pandemic remained ongoing. In a statement posted on their Instagram, the band said: "These are incredibly difficult times for a lot of people, and until we can be sure that we will be able to play shows in a way that is safe for our fans and crew, we have decided the best course of action is to cancel our touring." With the last show performed in Dublin on 3 March 2020, the tour concluded two months before the release of Notes on a Conditional Form.

=== Mindshower ===
Upon entering Mindshower, users are able to explore the lobby (pictured) to access exclusive literature, artwork and music from Notes on a Conditional Form.

On 14 February 2020, the Mindshower website was launched as a "digital detox", featuring a countdown set to expire on 19 February. Numerous easter eggs were hidden within the source code, including a link to satirical incel subreddit and nonsensical empowering messages. Social media posts made by Hann and Healy fuelled speculation about the 1975's connection to the website. When the countdown expired on 19 February, the website debuted "The Birthday Party" and its music video, in which the band visits the retreat. The 1975 partnered with Amazon to relaunch Mindshower on 21 May. A competition involving fan-made artwork was also held, with the winner being featured in Amazon Music's marketing campaign for Notes on a Conditional Form. The website features literature from several collaborators involved with the album, including a journal from set designer Tobias Rylander, a magazine from designer Samuel Burgess-Johnson, photos from photographer Jordan Curtis Hughes and creative director Patricia Villirillo, and behind-the-scenes access from producer Jonathan Gilmore. Additionally, users can access the computer at the reception desk and download extra content from the album including links to homemade merchandise, artwork and stems.

=== Artists Respond to NOACF ===
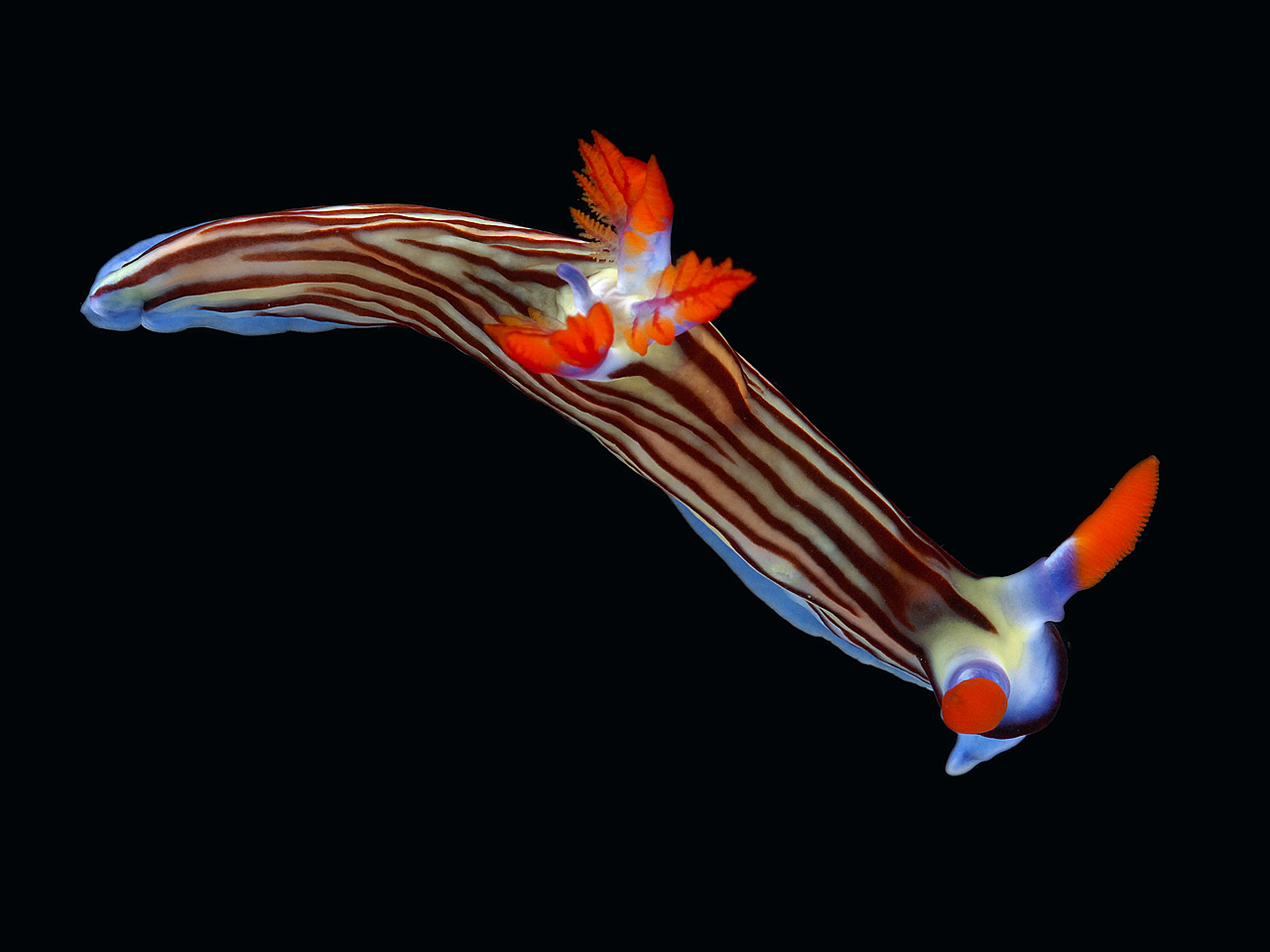
Demon Sanctuary trained a generative adversarial network using pictures of sea slugs for "The End (Music For Cars)".

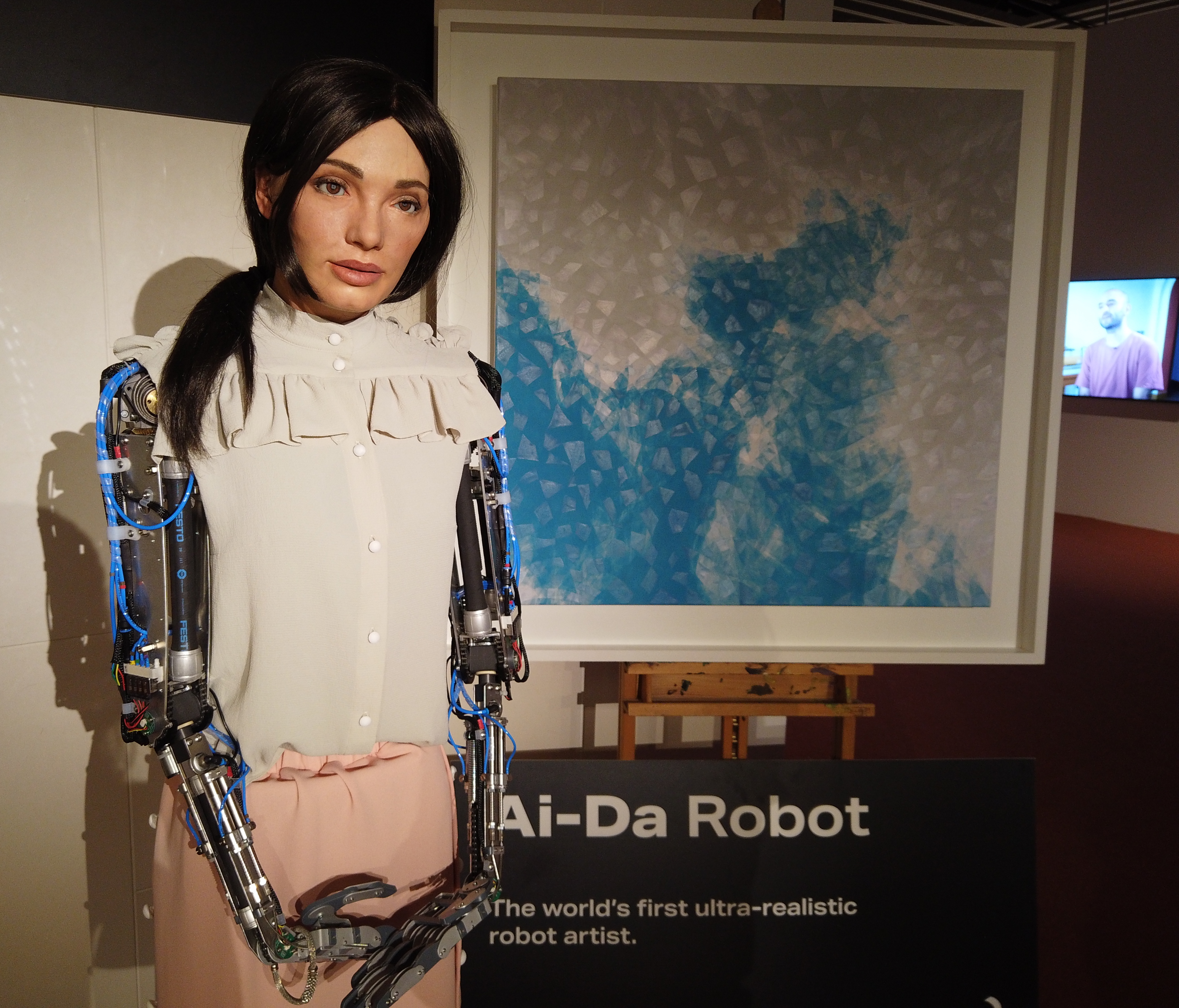
Ai-Da, a humanoid robot, created the visual for "Yeah I Know".

To accompany Notes on a Conditional Form, the 1975 created an online art exhibition titled Artists Respond to NOACF, taking the form of a YouTube playlist. The exhibition was created following the suspension of the Music for Cars Tour, with the band wanting to create something virtual for their fans to enjoy. They worked alongside Ditto to commission 14 artists to "respond" to 14 of the album's songs. Artists Respond to NOACF features contributions from Agusta YR, Ai-Da, Alice Bucknell, Christopher MacInnes, Demon Sanctuary, Frederick Paxton, Jacolby Satterwhite, Joey Holder, Lu Yang, Mia Kerin, Most Dismal Swamp, Rindon Johnson, Sondra Perry, and Weirdcore. The artists used different mediums and disciplines to create their visuals, featuring artificial intelligence, generative animation, motion-capture animation, performance, robotics and other technologies. Each of the artists focused on the main themes explored on Notes on a Conditional Form: technology, hope, love, anxiety and violence.

For "Tonight (I Wish I Was Your Boy)", Most Dismal Swamp focused on a 3D animated teddy bear, while Demon Sanctuary employed a generative adversarial network (GAN) using sea slugs for "The End (Music For Cars)", and MacInnes' contribution for "Streaming" used images from international imageboards such as 4chan. Agusta YR produced a film within a film for "Then Because She Goes", while Paxton's "Shiny Collarbone" used footage from the Arirang Mass Games in Pyongyang and Johnson created a utopian city for "Don't Worry". Ai-Da, a humanoid robot, made a painting for "Yeah I Know" and Bucknell rendered three distinct futuristic cities for "I Think There's Something You Should Know". Perry's contribution focused on a Black 3D avatar for "What Should I Say", Weirdcore's visual for "Bagsy Not In Net" features kaleidoscopic patterns of astronauts, while Holder's film for "Nothing Revealed / Everything Denied" was inspired by sigils, the occult and The Book of Pleasure: Psychology of Ecstasy (1913) by Austin Osman Spare. Kerin plays a cowgirl in her video for "Roadkill", while Satterwhite's art for "Having No Head" is an animated tribute to Breonna Taylor. In the final video for Artists Respond to NOACF, Yang performs "Playing on My Mind" as her non-binary alter ego, Doku. A visual for "Jesus Christ 2005 God Bless America", created by Candela Capitán, was quickly removed after its release due to its explicit nature.

== Commercial performance ==
In the 1975's native United Kingdom, Notes on a Conditional Form debuted atop the UK Albums Chart, selling 34,000 album-equivalent units in its first week. 71 percent of their first week sales were attributed to pure album sales, including 7,000 vinyl copies–the fastest-selling vinyl record of 2020 at the time of its release. It became their fourth consecutive number one on the chart, which made the 1975 the sixth act in history to achieve this feat. In Scotland, the album reached number one on the Scottish Albums chart. In 2023, the album was certified gold in the United Kingdom, denoting 100,000 equivalent units. Elsewhere in Europe, Notes on a Conditional Form reached number two on the Irish Albums chart, number 30 on the Austrian Albums chart, number 36 on the Dutch, German and Swiss Albums charts, number 67 on the Belgian Albums chart, number 69 on the Lithuanian Albums chart and number 100 on the Italian Albums chart.

In the United States, Notes on a Conditional Form debuted at number four on the US Billboard 200 chart with sales of 54,000 equivalent album units, including 39,000 pure album sales. It became the 1975's third top-five album on the chart, following I Like It When You Sleep, for You Are So Beautiful yet So Unaware of It and A Brief Inquiry into Online Relationships. It also debuted atop the US Billboard Top Rock Albums chart and was later ranked at number 62 on the chart's year-end version. Elsewhere in North America, the album peaked at number 19 on the Billboard Canadian Albums Chart. In the Asia-Pacific region, Notes on a Conditional Form reached the top of the Australian Albums chart, number four on the New Zealand Albums chart, number 14 on the Billboard Japan Hot Albums chart and number 17 on the Japanese Albums chart.

== Reception ==
=== Critical response ===
Professional ratings
Aggregate scores
Source	Rating
AnyDecentMusic?	6.8/10
Metacritic	69/100
Review scores
Source	Rating
AllMusic	3/5 stars
Clash	8/10
Consequence of Sound	B+
Entertainment Weekly	A−
The Guardian	3/5 stars
The Independent	1/5 stars
NME	5/5 stars
Paste	5.1/10
Pitchfork	8.0/10
Rolling Stone	3/5 stars

Notes on a Conditional Form received polarised reviews from contemporary music critics, with some deeming it confusing and chaotic, while others viewed it as "a work of panoramic genius." Aggregating website Metacritic reports a normalised rating of 69, based on 28 critical reviews, indicating "generally favourable reviews". AnyDecentMusic? gave it 6.8 out of 10, based on their assessment of the critical consensus.

Stubbs gave the album a perfect five-star review, describing it as boundary-pushing and "totally, refreshingly unfiltered – musically and lyrically." He praised its confessional themes, musical diversity and subversion of expectations. Mosk awarded the album a score of 9.7 out of 10, giving perfect scores for the music quality, production, originality, sonic diversity and lyrics, calling it: "a musical odyssey layered in sound and substance: A genreless, emotionally stirring work of art ready to be the new soundtrack to your life." More specifically, he highlighted the raw, emotionally indulgent nature of the lyrics and the ambitious, adventurous musical style, predicting it would serve as the voice of a generation. Dillon Eastoe of Gigwise extolled the band for defying the expectations placed upon them, commending the album's lyrical introspection, sonic variety and creativity, deeming it "easily the most interesting and confusing major release by an arena-selling guitar band in a long while." Fitzmaurice lauded the album for defying categorization, calling it "a delightfully overstuffed collection featuring some of [the band's] best and most immediately pleasing work to date." He praised the self-references, collaborations and ability to balance the inclusion of new genres with the band's signature sound, deeming it a testament to Daniel and Healy's vision.

Writing for PopMatters, Jordan Blum gave Notes on a Conditional Form a positive review, calling the album intriguing, sprawling and chameleonic. He wrote that despite a lack of complete coherence, it demonstrated "a level of unquenchable ambition, creativity, and outspoken curiosity that's rarely felt in popular music today." musicOMH editor Ross Horton awarded the album four out of five stars, writing: "If this is [the 1975's] worst album, and you might believe that it is, then they very well may be the best band in the world." He commended the band's growth, maturity and willingness to take risks, but felt the album's second half was more substantial than its first. Similarly, Small felt the album served as both the 1975's opus and an ode to their previous albums, commenting: "if you thought [A Brief Inquiry into Online Relationships] was an experimental risk, [Notes on a Conditional Form] will blow you out of the water." She praised the album's bold instrumentation and willingness to incorporate different genres, but was ambivalent towards the lyrics, finding them "often less than brilliant." Gormely scored the album eight out of ten, saying its "ambition and execution can't be denied. This is the 1975 operating at the peak of their powers." While praising the personal and introspective lyrics, he viewed the album as bloated. Sodomsky awarded it the same score, calling it "a long, messy experiment that just so happens to peak with some of their sharpest songs." He lauded the quiet, introspective lyricism and deemed the production as the band's most intricate and impressive yet, specifically praising Daniel for his role as the band's "secret weapon". However, Sodomsky felt the tracklist could be condensed.

Awarding the album a score of 6 out of 10, Joe Rivers of No Ripcord deemed it messy and unfocused. He felt the album was too ambitious, weighed down by a long run time, too many genres, forgettable instrumental pieces and no distinct overall concept. However, Rivers praised other aspects as "very, very good" and featured some of the best songs of the band's career, saying: "[Notes on a Conditional Form] is a fantastic 12 track, 45-minute album. It's just a shame that [t]he 1975 decided to make it into a 22 track, 80 minute one." Writing for Paste, Lizzie Manno praised the album's musical ambition, but found the lack of connecting threads made it overwhelming, inconsistent and exhaustingly chaotic, saying it was "far too ambitious and self-aware ... for its own good." In his review of Notes on a Conditional Form, Alexis Petridis of The Guardian commended the album's experimental nature but felt the lack of boundaries between genres was more akin to a Spotify playlist than an album. The A.V. Club writer Annie Zaleski was receptive to the beginning of the album but criticised the instrumentals, lyrical shallowness and sequencing as it progressed, writing: "the sonic hopscotch that once amplified the group's singularity now feels like a liability." In a negative review, Biddles lambasted Notes on a Conditional Form as flat, directionless and inessential, viewing most of the album's songs as unremarkable and indistinguishable. She specifically criticised the "directionless" instrumentals and the repetitive nature of many songs, saying: "it is disheartening to witness [the 1975] with nearly nothing of note to say." Similarly, The Independent's Roisin O'Connor deemed the album "a smug farrago" filled with inconsistent nonsense, meaningless orchestral interludes and indistinguishable dance songs, calling it "a 22-track parade of stream-of-consciousness self-indulgence."

=== Accolades ===
Regarding reception from music audiences, NPR listeners voted Notes on a Conditional Form the 44th most popular album of 2020, while Pitchfork readers voted it the 32nd best album of the year.

Accolades for Notes on a Conditional Form
Publication	Accolade	Rank	Ref.
Alternative Press	The Best 50 Albums of 2020	*	
Rachel Aroesti (The Guardian)	Guardian Albums and Tracks of 2020	*	
Atwood Magazine	2020 Albums of the Year	*	
Eve Barlow (The Guardian)	Guardian Albums and Tracks of 2020	*	
Billboard	The Best 50 Albums of 2020	29	
Billboard	The 25 Best Rock Albums of 2020	5	
BrooklynVegan	Top 55 Albums of 2020	36	
Complex	The Best Albums of 2020	33	
Complex	The Best Albums of 2020 (So Far)	17	
Coup de Main Magazine	The Best Albums of 2020	5	
Dork	Albums of the Year 2020	10	
Entertainment Weekly	The Best Albums of 2020... So Far	*	
Esquire	Best Albums of 2020	*	
The Fader	The 50 Best Albums of 2020	46	
The Guardian	The 50 Best Albums of 2020	36	
Hot Press	Hot Press Albums of 2020	13	
Insider	The 20 Best Albums of 2020	19	
The Morning Call	Best Albums of 2020 So Far	*	
The Music	Album of the Year	1	
The Music	The 30 Best Albums of 2020 (So Far)	*	
NME	The 50 Best Albums of 2020	43	
Edwin Ortiz (Complex)	Our Favorite Songs and Albums of 2020	1	
PopMatters	The 60 Best Albums of 2020	38	
Slant Magazine	The 50 Best Albums of 2020	21	
Kate Solomon (The Guardian)	Guardian Albums and Tracks of 2020	*	
Stereogum	The 50 Best Albums of 2020	17	
Stereogum	The 50 Best Albums of 2020 – Mid-Year	5	
Square One Magazine	Albums of the Year 2020	*	
Under the Radar	The Top 100 Albums of 2020	58	
Uproxx	The 2020 Uproxx Music Critics Poll	19	
Variety	Best Albums of 2020 – Mid-Year	*	
Yardbarker	The 30 Best Albums of 2020	*	
Yardbarker	The 25 Best Albums of the Year – Mid-Year	*	

== Track listing ==
All tracks are written by Matthew Healy, George Daniel, Adam Hann and Ross MacDonald, and produced by Daniel and Healy, except where noted. (Note: Writing credits are according to the album's liner notes. Pitchfork lists slightly different writing credits, with each track credited as written by Daniel, M. Healy, Ross MacDonald and Adam Hann, except: "The 1975", written by Daniel, M. Healy and Thunberg; "Tonight (I Wish I Was Your Boy)", written by Daniel, M. Healy, MacDonald, Hann, Gomez and Hiroshi Sato; "Shiny Collarbone", written by Daniel, M. Healy, MacDonald, Hann and Cutty Ranks; "Bagsy Not in Net", written by Daniel, M. Healy and Christopher Cross; "Don't Worry", written by Daniel, M. Healy, MacDonald, Hann and T. Healy.; The BMI repertoire hosts its own distinct set of writing credits, with each track credited as written by Daniel, Hann, M. Healy, and MacDonald, except: "Tonight (I Wish I Was Your Boy)", written by Daniel, Lorraine Feather, Gomez, Healy, Sato, Barrett Strong and Norman Whitfield; "Shiny Collarbone", written by Daniel, M. Healy and Philip Thomas; "Bagsy Not in Net", written by Cross, Daniel and M. Healy.)

Notes on a Conditional Form
No.	Title	Writer(s)	Producer(s)	Length
1.	"The 1975"	Daniel; M. Healy; Greta Thunberg		4:55
2.	"People"		Daniel; M. Healy; Jonathan Gilmore	2:38
3.	"The End (Music for Cars)"			2:30
4.	"Frail State of Mind"			3:53
5.	"Streaming"			1:32
6.	"The Birthday Party"			4:45
7.	"Yeah I Know"			4:13
8.	"Then Because She Goes"		Daniel; M. Healy; Gilmore	2:07
9.	"Jesus Christ 2005 God Bless America"			4:23
10.	"Roadkill"		Daniel; M. Healy; Gilmore	2:55
11.	"Me & You Together Song"		Daniel; M. Healy; Gilmore	3:27
12.	"I Think There's Something You Should Know"			4:00
13.	"Nothing Revealed / Everything Denied"			3:38
14.	"Tonight (I Wish I Was Your Boy)"	Daniel; M. Healy; Hann; MacDonald; Guendoline Rome Viray Gomez; Hiroshi Sato		4:07
15.	"Shiny Collarbone"			2:50
16.	"If You're Too Shy (Let Me Know)"		Daniel; M. Healy; Gilmore	5:19
17.	"Playing on My Mind"			3:24
18.	"Having No Head"			6:04
19.	"What Should I Say"			4:06
20.	"Bagsy Not in Net"	Daniel; M. Healy; Christopher Cross		2:26
21.	"Don't Worry"	Tim Healy		2:48
22.	"Guys"		Daniel; M. Healy; Gilmore	4:29
Total length:				80:29

Samples

- "Tonight (I Wish I Was Your Boy)" contains an uncredited sample from "Just My Imagination (Running Away with Me)", as performed by the Temptations; and "Say Goodbye", as performed by Hiroshi Sato.
- "Bagsy Not in Net" contains an uncredited sample from "Sailing", as performed by Christopher Cross.

== Personnel ==
Credits are adapted from the liner notes of Notes on a Conditional Form.

The 1975

- Matthew Healy – vocals (2, 4, 6–14, 16–17, 19–22), guitar (2, 8–11, 14, 16), banjo (6), keyboards (1), piano (6)
- Adam Hann – guitar (2, 4, 6, 8, 10, 11, 14, 16, 22)
- Ross MacDonald – bass guitar (2, 6, 8, 10, 11, 13–14, 16, 22), double bass (9)
- George Daniel – drums (2, 6, 8, 10–14, 16, 19, 22), backing vocals (22), synthesisers (2, 4–5, 7, 9, 13, 15–16, 18–19, 22), keyboards (1, 7, 9–10, 13–16, 18–19), piano (4, 6, 12, 18), programming (1, 7, 15, 18–20), strings (1), harp (4, 12), vibraphone (6, 12)

Producers and engineers

- George Daniel – production, mixing (15, 20)
- Matthew Healy – production
- Jonathan Gilmore – production (2, 8, 10–11, 16, 22), engineering
- Luke Gibbs – assistant engineering
- Mike Crossey – mixing
- Stephen Sesso – mix assistance
- Robin Schmidt – mastering

Additional vocalists

- Greta Thunberg – vocals (1)
- Phoebe Bridgers – additional vocals (9), backing vocals (8, 10, 17)
- FKA Twigs – introduction vocals (16), additional vocals (19)
- Tim Healy – additional vocals (21)
- Cutty Ranks – additional vocals (15)

Arrangements

- George Daniel – orchestral arrangements, horn arrangements
- Matthew Healy – orchestral arrangements, horn arrangements
- Sam Swallow – orchestral arrangements
- John Waugh – horn arrangements

Artwork

- Samuel Burgess-Johnson – art direction
- Ed Blow – art direction
- Matthew Healy – art direction
- Jordan Curtis Hughes – photography

Additional musicians

- Jamie Squire – guitar (13, 16), piano (13, 21), keyboards (13)
- John Waugh – tenor saxophone (6, 9, 12, 16, 18)
- Ben Lester – pedal steel (5, 9, 17)
- Rashawn Ross – trumpet (6, 9, 12, 16), flugelhorn (6, 12, 16)
- Roy Hargrove – trumpet (4)
- Lemar Guillary – trombone (6, 16)
- Bob Reynolds – tenor saxophone (6, 12, 16), alto saxophone (6, 12, 16)
- Helen Keen – flute (3, 5)
- Lindsey Ellis – flute (3, 5), piccolo (3, 5)
- Gareth Hulse – oboe (3, 5)
- Ruth Berresford – oboe (3, 5)
- Nick Rodwell – clarinet (3, 5)
- Lois Au – bassoon (3, 5)
- Martin Owen – French horn (3, 5)
- Tim Jones – French horn (3, 5)
- Pip Eastop – French horn (3, 5)
- Dan Newell – trumpet (3, 5)
- Christian Barraclough – trumpet (3, 5)
- Andy Wood – tenor trombone (3, 5)
- Ed Tarrant – tenor trombone (3, 5)
- Barry Clements – bass trombone (3, 5)
- Owen Slade – tuba (3, 5)
- Frank Ricotti – percussion (3, 5)
- Suzy Willison-Kawalec – harp (3, 5, 12)
- Everton Nelson – violin (leader) (3, 5, 12)
- Emlyn Singleton – violin (leader of seconds) (3, 5, 12)
- Oli Langford – violin (3, 5, 12)
- Marianne Haynes – violin (3, 5, 12)
- Kate Robinson – violin (3, 5, 12)
- Ben Hancox – violin (3, 5, 12)
- Ciaran McCabe – violin (3, 5, 12)
- Ian Humphries – violin (3, 5, 12)
- Debbie Widdup – violin (3, 5, 12)
- Warren Zielinski – violin (3, 5, 12)
- Tom Pigot-Smith – violin (3, 5, 12)
- Perry Montague-Mason – violin (3, 5, 12)
- Natalia Bonner – violin (3, 5, 12)
- Martyn Jackson – violin (3, 5, 12)
- Bruce White – viola (3, 5, 12)
- Gillianne Haddow – viola (3, 5, 12)
- Andy Parker – viola (3, 5, 12)
- Peter Lale – viola (3, 5, 12)
- Lydia Lowndes-Northcott – viola (3, 5, 12)
- Ian Burdge – cello (3, 5, 12)
- Vicky Matthews – cello (3, 5, 12)
- Chris Worsey – cello (3, 5, 12)
- Jonny Byers – cello (3, 5, 12)
- Chris Laurence – double bass (3, 5)
- Stacey Watton – double bass (3, 5)
- The London Community Gospel Choir – performance (13)

== Charts ==
=== Weekly charts ===
Chart performance for Notes on a Conditional Form
Chart (2020)	Peak position
Australian Albums (ARIA)	1
Austrian Albums (Ö3 Austria)	30
Belgian Albums (Ultratop Flanders)	67
Canadian Albums (Billboard)	19
Dutch Albums (Album Top 100)	36
German Albums (Offizielle Top 100)	36
Greek Albums (IFPI)	21
Irish Albums (Official Charts)	2
Italian Albums (FIMI)	100
Japan Hot Albums (Billboard Japan)	15
Japanese Albums (Oricon)	17
Lithuanian Albums (AGATA)	69
New Zealand Albums (RMNZ)	4
Scottish Albums (Official Charts)	1
Swiss Albums (Schweizer Hitparade)	36
UK Albums (Official Charts)	1
US Billboard 200	4
US Top Rock Albums (Billboard)	1

=== Year-end charts ===
2020 year-end chart performance for Notes on a Conditional Form
Chart (2020)	Position
US Top Rock Albums (Billboard)	62

== Certifications ==
Region	Certification	Certified units/sales
United Kingdom (BPI)	Gold	100,000^{‡}
^{‡} Sales+streaming figures based on certification alone.

== See also ==
- The 1975 discography
- List of songs by Matty Healy
