= Tonight (I Wish I Was Your Boy) =

Song by pop band the 1975

Song by the 1975

from the album Notes on a Conditional Form
- Released: 22 May 2020
- Genre: Alternative R&B; neo soul
- Length: 4:07
- Label: Dirty Hit; Polydor
- Songwriters: Matthew Healy; George Daniel; Adam Hann; Ross MacDonald; Guendoline Viray Rome Gomez; Hiroshi Sato
- Producers: Matthew Healy; George Daniel

Visualiser video
- "Tonight (I Wish I Was Your Boy)" on YouTube

"Tonight (I Wish I Was Your Boy)" is a song by English band the 1975 from their fourth studio album, Notes on a Conditional Form (2020). The song was written by band members Matty Healy, George Daniel, Adam Hann and Ross MacDonald alongside Guendoline Viray Rome Gomez and Hiroshi Sato. Daniel and Healy handled the production of the song. It originated from an a cappella sample, with the band gradually merging different pieces of music together to create the final version. Healy was inspired by the Backstreet Boys, producer Max Martin and rapper Kanye West, along with the melodic music of Brandy, Whitney Houston, SWV and TLC.

"Tonight (I Wish I Was Your Boy)" is a mid-tempo experimental alternative R&B and neo soul slow jam. The song is produced in a retro 1990s style, containing a funk-influenced drum beat, reggae rhythms, brass instrumentation and influences of contemporary R&B, electropop, jazz, dub, ska and electronic music. The lyrics recount Healy's wish that his feelings of attraction toward a potential partner are reciprocated, touching upon themes of existentialism and dread. The song samples "Just My Imagination (Running Away with Me)" by the Temptations, while the chord progression is based around Sato's "Say Goodbye".

"Tonight (I Wish I Was Your Boy)" was deemed an album highlight by numerous contemporary music critics and later included in several year-end lists. Contemporary reviewers praised the song's lyrics, its sampling of the Temptations and sonic experimentation. Commercially, the song reached number 11 on the US Billboard Hot Rock & Alternative Songs chart, number 14 on the New Zealand Hot Singles Chart, number 56 on the UK Singles Chart and number 67 in Ireland. A music video for the song was released on 22 May 2020. Directed by Most Dismal Swamp, it follows the exploits of a depressed teddy bear who becomes haunted by frightening images originating from within his computer.

== Background and development ==
"I don't think we ever do anything retro. We never do anything pastiche-y. But there's definitely a reflection on a certain time of our musical upbringing. And that was very much part of that."

— Healy, on creating "Tonight (I Wish I Was Your Boy)".

In April 2017, the 1975 announced Music For Cars, the follow-up record to their second studio album I Like It When You Sleep, for You Are So Beautiful yet So Unaware of It (2016), with it being set for release in 2018. However, in May 2018, Healy announced that Music For Cars would now represent an "era" composed of two studio albums. The first, A Brief Inquiry into Online Relationships (2018), was released in November of the same year. The band began recording the second album Notes on a Conditional Form, prior to the release of A Brief Inquiry into Online Relationships. Recording continued through 2019 during their Music for Cars Tour, intending to release it in May 2019. Healy deferred the album's release several times, scheduling it for 21 February 2020 and later for 24 April. Regarding the delays, the singer said they were caused by giving interviewers arbitrary release dates. Ultimately, Notes on a Conditional Form was released on 22 May 2020.

Speaking on the development of "Tonight (I Wish I Was Your Boy)", Healy said: "I struggled with this song because it was almost like a sonic experiment, a mixture of samples." The basis of the instrumental was first created by Daniel, who had an a cappella sample of "Just My Imagination (Running Away with Me)" (1971) by the Temptations. He also possessed a piano arrangement that he created from scratch, being unsure of how to incorporate it into the album. A rough version of a separate song, containing a sample of "Say Goodbye" (1985) from Japanese city pop artist Hiroshi Sato, was originally written by No Rome–a friend and frequent collaborator of the 1975–who intended to release it for himself. Healy continuously listened to the demo throughout the recording of Notes on a Conditional Form. He and Daniel realised that all three pieces worked well together when combined into a single song, thus they merged them together. The new version layered the piano instrumental over the Temptations sample, providing the opening, while "Say Goodbye" was used to create the chord progression. Healy called "Tonight (I Wish I Was Your Boy)" the "anomaly" on Notes on a Conditional Form. It was written during a relaxed, experimental and naive period of the album's recording. They wanted to reference the early music of Kanye West, the later period of the Backstreet Boys and the late 1990s pop music of Max Martin. Healy was also influenced by "rich melodic music" of Brandy, Whitney Houston, SWV and TLC, specifically the latter of the four's sophomore album CrazySexyCool (1994). Overall, the 1975 wanted to keep the tone fun and uplifting, although they expressed some concern about wasting time not writing about more serious subject matters.

== Composition ==
"Tonight (I Wish I Was Your Boy)"
A 25-second sample of "Tonight (I Wish I Was Your Boy)" showcasing the song's blend of reggae rhythms, brass instrumentation and a funk-influenced drum beat.

Musically, "Tonight (I Wish I Was Your Boy)" is an experimental alternative R&B and neo soul song. The song is a mid-tempo slow jam that runs for a length of four minutes and seven seconds (4:07). The hazy, retro production is evocative of the late 1990s, consisting of offbeat guitar upstrokes, a funk-influenced drum beat, pianos, keyboards, a rumbling beat, reggae rhythms, brass instrumentation, "squelchy" synths and influences of contemporary R&B, electropop, jazz, dub, ska and electronic music. Samantha Small of Consequence of Sound deemed it "a swaggered, finger-snapping song about a relationship misstep", while Sam Sodomsky of Pitchfork said the song "spills late-night heartbreak to a pitched-up Temptations sample". Brittany Spanos of Rolling Stone compared the use of guitar-influenced R&B and 2000s pop music in "Tonight (I Wish I Was Your Boy)" to the band's "Somebody Else" (2016) and "Sincerity Is Scary" (2018).

Lyrically, "Tonight (I Wish I Was Your Boy)" revolves around Healy's attraction towards a potential partner, hoping his feelings are reciprocated. The song explores the themes of existentialism and dread. It begins with a high-pitched soul sample of "Just My Imagination (Running Away with Me)" that is modified through a vocoder, which Ben Boddez of Vancouver Weekly noted as reminiscent of West. The sample incorporates lines such as: "But once again, runnin' away with me / This couldn't be a dream / Runnin' away with me." The lyrics stem from the last two lines of the second verse in "Just My Imagination (Running Away with Me)", merging them with the first two lines of its chorus. The song then drops into a reggae-inspired tempo, with Healy singing: "Give yourself a new name / Change your voice on the train / Have a complain about your fame / Tell me that it's all a rigged game." In the chorus, the singer reprises a portion of the sample as he confesses: "Tonight, I wish I was your boy (Run away from me‚ run away from me)". After the song reaches its climax, all the instruments fade into the background, leaving only a horn section.

== Reception ==
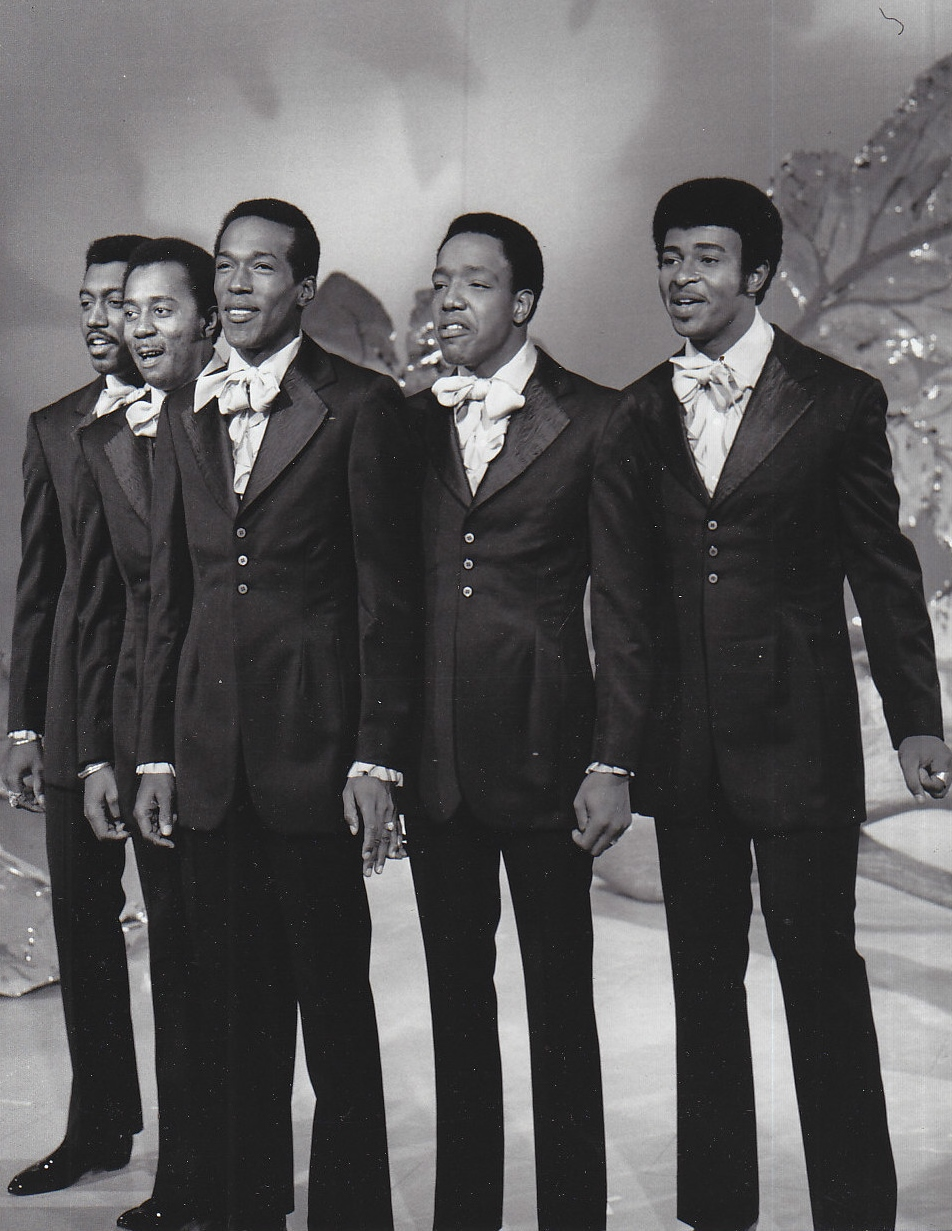
Several critics praised the interpolation of the Temptations' (pictured) "Just My Imagination (Running Away with Me)" (1971).

Brenton Blanchet of Spin extolled the Temptations sample, calling the track the best song on Notes on a Conditional Form. Caroline Edwards of Riot Magazine deemed it one of two standouts on the album. Spanos called the song a highlight from the album, a sentiment shared by Shahlin Graves of Coup de Main. Maggie McHale and Erica Garcia of Atwood Magazine felt "Tonight (I Wish I Was Your Boy)" is the best non-single on the album, while their colleague Nina Schaarschmidt praised the band's "amazing ability to connect lyrics to genre blending melodies that make you feel what they are singing about". NME called the song a standout from Notes on a Conditional Form, awarding it a spot on their weekly NME Radio Roundup. Similarly, Pitchfork included the song on their weekly Pitchfork Selects Playlist, which "highlights songs that [their] writers, editors, and contributors are listening to on repeat". Cleveland Magazine declared "Tonight (I Wish I Was Your Boy)" the 10th best song of 2020, with Troy Smith commending the mixture of the 1975's signature sound with a sonic evolution. Callie Ahlgrim of Insider deemed it the 15th best song of 2020, highlighting the use of existentialism and dread in the lyrics, saying: "The beauty of ['Tonight (I Wish I Was Your Boy)']— much like many of the band's best songs [...] is that you can dance while you panic." Mya Singleton of Yardbarker selected the song for inclusion in her year-end playlist, calling it a standout from Notes on a Conditional Form that "immediately draws listeners in with its smooth sample".

Adrian Garro of Rock Cellar Magazine declared "Tonight (I Wish I Was Your Boy)" a highlight from the album, noting its underused potential as a single. Larry Fitzmaurice of Entertainment Weekly said the song was "effectively the 1975's bid for the ever-elusive 'song of the summer' honorific". Boddez praised the song's hook as euphoric, commenting that it was "instantly iconic". Alex Shwear of Flood Magazine compared the use of the vocal sample to a mid-2000s Dipset song. Ali Shutler and Stephen Ackroyd of Dork praised the song's placement in the album's central run, saying that "it's arguable the band have never sounded better". In her review of Notes on a Conditional Form, Courtney Larocca of Insider lauded the line "How can I be yours if you're not mine?" for the simplicity and tenderness, calling it a perfect line. Overall, she felt the song is clean, gentle and "utterly flawless". Dillon Eastoe of Gigwise called it "another experiment that really shouldn't work but just... does?" Commercially, "Tonight (I Wish I Was Your Boy)" debuted at number 56 on the UK Singles Chart with sales of 8,813 units. Elsewhere, the song peaked at number 11 on the US Billboard Hot Rock & Alternative Songs chart, number 14 on the New Zealand Hot Singles chart and number 67 in Ireland.

== Music video ==
A music video for "Tonight (I Wish I Was Your Boy)" was released on 22 May 2020 as the first visual from the 1975's online art exhibition Artists Respond to NOACF. The video was created by Most Dismal Swamp, an art collective led by Dane Sutherland. It begins with a depressed teddy bear laying in his bedroom. The bear stands up, looking outside his distorted baroque window at an expansive meadow before sitting down at his gaming computer. He enters another world within the screen and encounters several frightening images before running away. Repeating the same process from the beginning of the visual, the bear enters the screen again, coming across a winged creature. However, the images leak out into his room and haunt him as the video darkens. The bear begins to dance and light returns to the room as the walls fall down, revealing the nature around him. As the video concludes, the camera pans off into the sky.

Sutherland was responsible for directing, editing and creating the storyboards. He wanted to capture the dream-like quality of "Tonight (I Wish I Was Your Boy)", observing the main narrative as being lost between anxiety and nostalgia. Additionally, Sutherland was inspired by the themes of technology, hope and anxiety present on Notes on a Conditional Form. He began by locating the narrators' frame of mind within the song, interpreting them as being trapped within a moment, fantisising about another time or timeline. Having identified the song's voice, Sutherland chose to create a teddy bear to personify these feelings. Speaking on the video, the filmmaker called it: "A bittersweet dream where you'd get lost, then have that feeling amplified by the shock of your actual reality when the dream ends." The UE development and filming of the video was done by GVN908, while Samuel Capps handled the visual effects. Tissue Hunter was responsible for the 2D animations, Hannah Rose Stewart designed the teddy bear and Olia Svetlanova designed the winged creature. Following the video's release, Derrick Rossignol of Uproxx said that the teddy bear "like many folks right now, spends his time seated in front of his computer".

== Credits and personnel ==
Credits adapted from Notes on a Conditional Form album liner notes.

- Matthew Healy – composer, producer, guitar, vocals
- George Daniel – composer, producer, programming, drums, keyboards, synthesizer
- Adam Hann – composer, guitar
- Ross MacDonald – composer, bass
- Guendoline Viray Rome Gomez – composer
- Hiroshi Sato – composer
- Jonathan Gilmore – recording engineer
- Robin Schmidt – mastering engineer
- Mike Crossey – mixer

== Charts ==
Chart performance for "Tonight (I Wish I Was Your Boy)"
Chart (2020)	Peak position
New Zealand Hot Singles (RMNZ)	15
Ireland (IRMA)	67
UK Singles (Official Charts)	56
US Hot Rock & Alternative Songs (Billboard)	11

== See also ==
- The 1975 discography
- List of songs by Matty Healy
