= Frail State of Mind =

2019 song by the 1975

Single by the 1975

from the album Notes on a Conditional Form
- Released: 24 October 2019
- Genre: UK garage; electronica
- Length: 3:55
- Label: Dirty Hit; Polydor
- Songwriters: Matthew Healy; George Daniel; Adam Hann; Ross MacDonald
- Producers: Matthew Healy; George Daniel

The 1975 singles chronology
"People" (2019)	"Frail State of Mind" (2019)	"Me & You Together Song" (2020)

Music video
- "Frail State of Mind" on YouTube

"Frail State of Mind" is a song by English band the 1975. It was released on 24 October 2019 through Dirty Hit and Polydor Records as the second single, following "People" (2019), from their fourth studio album, Notes on a Conditional Form (2020). It was written by band members Matty Healy, George Daniel, Adam Hann and Ross MacDonald, while Daniel and Healy were responsible for the song's production. "Frail State of Mind" is an experimental UK garage and electronica ballad. Its ambient production is composed of a brisk dubstep beat, a heavy, shuffling drum line, cascading synths, chopped vocal melodies, and influences from a variety of electronic, modern rock, and electronic dance music subgenres. Lyrically, the single revolves around Healy's social anxiety and the themes of depression, fear, apprehensiveness, disappointment, insecurity, and anti-social behaviour.

"Frail State of Mind" was released to positive reviews from contemporary music critics, who praised its nuanced experimental electronic soundscape and lyrical honesty, with some deeming it an album highlight. Critics favourably compared the song to the band's previous work, specifically "TooTimeTooTimeTooTime" (2018) and "I Like America & America Likes Me" (2018) from their third studio album, A Brief Inquiry into Online Relationships (2018). Commercially, the single achieved moderate success on worldwide music charts, peaking at number 17 on the US Billboard Hot Rock & Alternative Songs chart, number 28 in New Zealand, number 54 on the UK Singles Chart, and number 69 in Ireland. A music video for the single was released on 21 November 2019. It featured lo-fi visuals of Healy in a cluttered room, while clips of a computer-simulated face, digital images, and the song's lyrics are interspersed. The video was well-received by critics, who extolled the "trippy" and "psychedelic" visuals.

== Background and development ==
"I think [this song is] the perfect example of when a 'Brief Inquiry' happened... [when] it all starts to feel very big... we were always reaching for the stars creatively. So there's that but it was almost like we kind of just closed the door on the world a little bit and just went into this record."

— Healy, during an interview with Zane Lowe of Beats 1.

In an interview with Aimee Cliff of Dazed, Healy spoke about one of the songs from Notes on a Conditional Form (2020) titled "Frail State of Mind", calling it a "sad, Burial kind of thing about social anxiety". Speaking with Zane Lowe of Beats 1, Healy said the song was about the world having a global anxiety attack, explaining: "The symptoms are really noticeable... The record is kind of about me and how I try and deal with that." The singer revealed the band felt frightened and overwhelmed following the success of A Brief Inquiry into Online Relationships, attempting to "reach for the stars" creatively. Channeling the experiences of their teenage selves, Healy and Daniel shut themselves out from the outside world and used their feelings of fragility and anxiety to create new music, resulting in "Frail State of Mind". Healy described the song as "sombre" and progressing from "sadness" to "euphoria". On the meaning behind the track, the singer told Lisa Wright of DIY it was about feeling the need to apologise for being antisocial, the fear of not being accepted, and the internal conflict of wanting to socialise but being too anxious to do so.

== Music and lyrics ==
"Frail State of Mind"
A 22-second sample of "Frail State of Mind" showcasing the song's experimental sound.

Musically, "Frail State of Mind" is an experimental UK garage and electronica ballad with a length of three minutes and fifty-five seconds. The song is written in the key of A major and follows a moderate tempo of 128 beats per minute in common time. Healy's vocal range spans from E♭3 to E♭4. "Frail State of Mind" incorporates elements from ambient music, trip hop, and jazz, in addition to electronic subgenres, such as 2-step garage, grime, and drum and bass, electronic dance music subgenres, including house, post-dubstep, tech house, dance-pop, and electropop, and modern rock subgenres, specifically soft rock, dream pop, and folktronica. "Frail State of Mind" contains cascading synths, a soft electronic piano loop, chopped vocal melodies, and atmospherics characteristic of ambient music, creating what Chris DeVille of Stereogum called "drizzly autumnal" textures. The brisk dubstep beat is built around a heavy, shuffling drum line, a common aspect of trip hop music. "Frail State of Mind" uses an unconventional song structure, built around three verses and omitting a formal chorus. The track begins with soothing ocean noises and synths. As it progresses, layers of sound are superimposed as the lyrics become increasingly frustrated. Following a short, stripped-down instrumental break, multiple layers of samples are added to the core beat as the song reaches its climax in the final verse.

Thematically, "Frail State of Mind" discusses Healy's social anxiety and the feelings ultimately derived from it, including depression, fear, apprehensiveness, disappointment, insecurity, and anti-social behaviour. Benjo Kazue of The Ponder called the single a "dark, macabre imaginative manifestation of the world's current state of anxiety, hate, war, rampant self obsessiveness and narcissistic self doubt." Throughout the song, Healy apologizes for not wanting to leave home ("Go outside? Seems unlikely"), ignoring phone calls ("I'm sorry that I missed your call / I watched it ring; 'Don't waste their time'") and not wanting to socialize with friends ("And I'll just leave at 9 / Don't wanna bore you with my frail state of mind"). Mark Richardson of The Wall Street Journal observed that "Frail State of Mind" appeared to showcase a dialogue between characters. The singer uses other voices to show a situation from multiple perspectives. Rhian Daly of NME shared this observation, noting the voices are absent from the song's dialogue in the final verse. In it, Healy engages in an internal back-and-forth and reveals his true feelings ("What's your biggest lie? / I'm sure that you're fine / I haven't felt alright in quite some time / You know they'll leave if you keep lying").

Exclaim! reviewer Ian Gormely called the single an "unintentional pandemic anthem" about social anxiety. Trey Alston of MTV News noted that the song focused on fear and apprehensiveness, represented musically by "drums [that] crawl around and constantly smash into each other as elastic synths unfurl and roll back up." Rob Harvilla of The Ringer described "Frail State of Mind" as a gentle, "anxiety-ridden" dubstep ballad balanced "between introversion and a remarkably insular sort of extroversion." DeVille found the incorporation of dubstep in "Frail State of Mind" reminiscent of British electronic musician Burial, and described the track as a "tender, hyper-modern lullaby about depression." Similarly, Kauze compared the song's ambient soundscape to electronic music producers such as Burial, Jamie xx, Boards of Canada, Blood Orange, and Jon Hopkins. The song also drew comparisons to the band's own discography, specifically the songs "TooTimeTooTimeTooTime" (2018), "How to Draw / Petrichor" (2018), and "I Like America & America Likes Me" (2018) from their third studio album, A Brief Inquiry into Online Relationships (2018). Sophia Andrade of The Harvard Crimson observed commonalities between the single and "How to Draw / Petrichor" (2018)", stemming from the use syncopated drums and synths in the song's intro. Andrade also opined that the melody was similar to "TooTimeTooTimeTooTime" (2018), an opinion shared by Daly, who called the "cadence" and "flow" nearly identical. Additionally, he noted fear as a theme present in both "Frail State of Mind" and "I Like America & America Likes Me" (2018), writing that inhabitants of metropolitan areas live in fear of being shot, stabbed, mugged, and assaulted.

== Reception ==
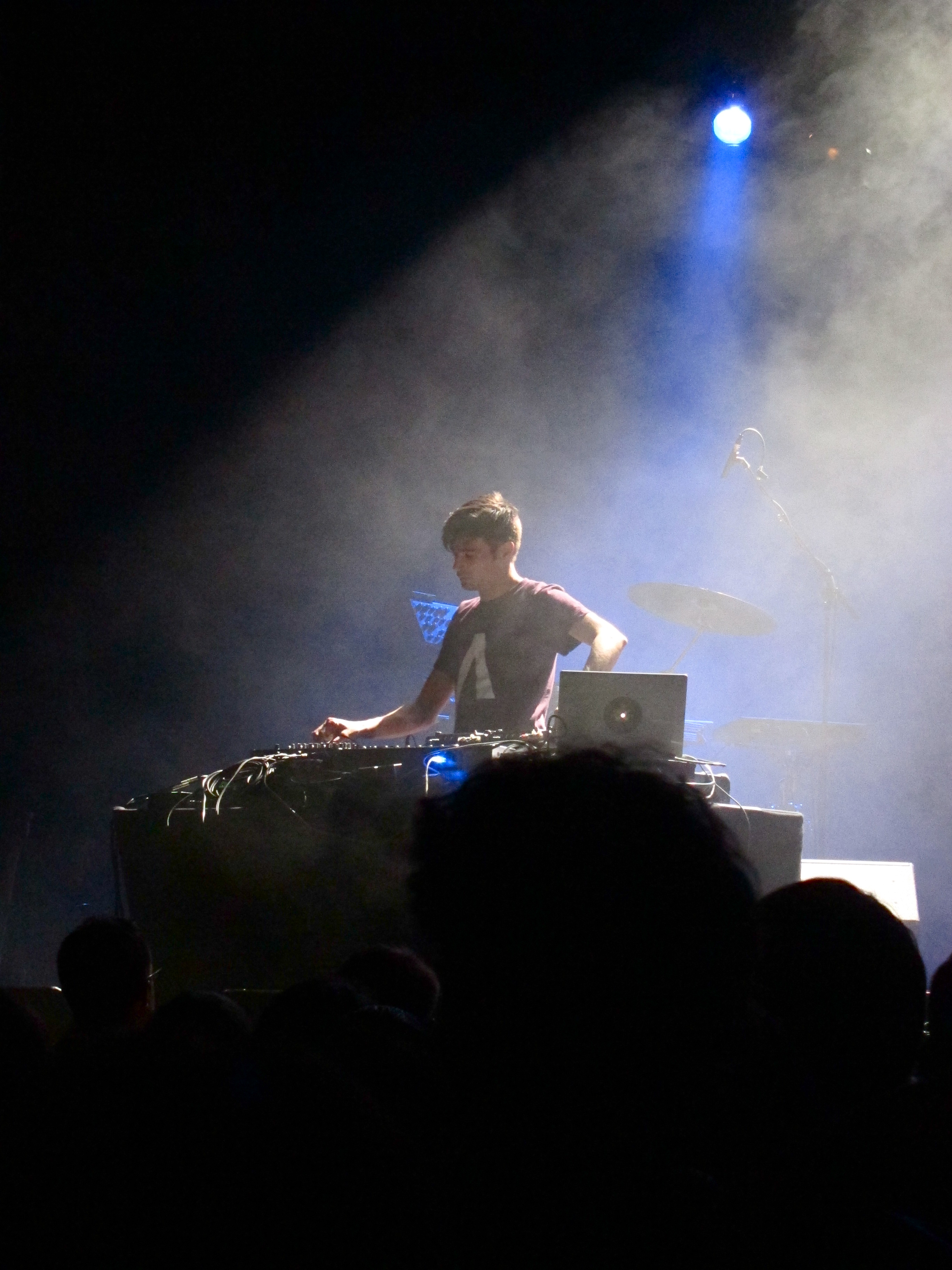
Multiple critics compared "Frail State of Mind" to the works of English musician Jon Hopkins (pictured).

Upon release, "Frail State of Mind" was well-received by contemporary music critics, who praised the production, themes, and lyrics, with several calling it a return to form. Sam Sodomsky of Pitchfork called the track "exquisite". In his review for NME, Daly wrote that "Frail State of Mind" was akin to "nightbus" music, a term coined by music journalists to describe a subgenre of ambient-influenced post-dubstep originating in South London, listened to on a bus home after going clubbing. While comparing the song's ambient atmospherics to Burial and Jon Hopkins, Daly extolled the lyrics for realistically expressing the anxiety and dread felt by young people both in the United Kingdom and abroad. Consequence of Sound writer Nina Corcoran called the track "warm and optimistic" despite its lyrics' downtrodden nature. Lizzie Manzo of Paste deemed "Frail State of Mind" an album highlight, praising its use of "hyper-calming, imaginative dance-pop" and "Blood Orange-esque vocal delivery." Lauren Murphy of The Irish Times declared "Frail State of Mind" one of her two top picks for readers to download. In a negative review for The Ponder, Kazue called "Frail State of Mind" the "kind of music that's sad, lonely and empty, but not with any kind of purpose outside of its own lowly ambition to leave you feeling sorry for another pasty white wimp."

Several critics complimented "Frail State of Mind" for returning to familiar territory, both sonically and lyrically. Writing for Stereogum, DeVille called the song "lovely stuff" that harkened back to the band's earlier work, praising Healy's "fresh spin on familiar themes." Courteney Larocca of Business Insider declared "Frail State of Mind" a "classic" example of the group's sound. She said: "from Healy's hazy backing vocals throughout to the elastic synths and prickly drum beat, there are a lot of textural elements here that you'd surely expect from the band — but these flourishes expertly come together to sonically evoke the generalized anxiety that Healy previously said the song was about." Andrade wrote for The Harvard Crimson that the single was "the link between the two Music for Cars albums", drawing comparisons between the track and several songs on A Brief Inquiry into Online Relationships (2018). She called it recognizable and "comforting", unlike "The 1975" (2019) and "People" (2019), which represented a radical musical departure from the band's previous album. Whitney Shoemaker of the Alternative Press called it an evolved version of "TooTimeTooTimeTooTime" (2018).

Reviewers reacted favourably to the 1975's willingness to openly discuss mental health in the song's lyrics. Dana Tetenburg of Euphoria praised the 1975 for "[having] a knack for turning elements of the human condition into experimental sound bites", noting the unconventional structure and vulnerable lyricism resulted in "something quite unnervingly ambient, providing a genuine insight into modern anxieties." Madison Vettorino of Atwood Magazine said "Frail State of Mind" demonstrated how the band uses their platform to highlight difficult topics, specifically the effects of social anxiety and the impact it can have on mental health. Vettorino praised the track for accurately depicting how it feels to battle anxiety, noting it would resonate with fans and send a message that "no one who struggles from it is alone." Alston of MTV News opined that the song "sinks beneath your skin and into your chest." He commended the relatability of the lyrics, noting that most listeners would be able to relate to its theme of anxiety, saying: "the soothing nature of this mysterious song might even make that anxiousness go away. Maybe that's the point: recognition, acceptance, and honesty." Heran Mamo of Billboard praised "Frail State of Mind" for its "brutally honest" narrative, saying the track "speaks to universal anxiety in an anxiety-driven world while reassuring listeners at moments like the acoustic flutter preceding the bridge." The song peaked at number 54 on the UK Singles Chart, number 69 in Ireland, number 17 on the US Billboard Hot Rock & Alternative Songs chart and number 28 on the New Zealand Hot Singles chart.

== Music video ==
A music video for "Frail State of Mind" was released on 21 November 2019. It was co-directed by Healy, Patricia Villirillo and Mara Palena, and filmed in a lo-fi, dulled VHS quality. The video initially begins in black and white and opens with Healy in a small, cluttered room filled with pictures, art, papers, flyers, and a camera in the centre. Images of Healy and the 1975 are projected onto the wall, while the singer films himself using a camcorder. Close-up shots of the singer staring directly into the camera, laying on the floor, sitting at a desk, and dancing in an ankle-length skirt in front of flashing colours are also shown. Images of a computer-simulated face, digital images, and the song's lyrics displayed in red text overlaid on a black screen are interspersed between shots of Healy. The video has drawn comparisons to the visuals for their previous single, "Love It If We Made It" (2018).

DIY magazine called the music video "beautiful" and viewed the clip as "a visual representation of [Healy] being caught up in his own mind and isolating himself from others, with the glitchy graphics reflecting the music of the song itself." Clash magazine writer Robin Murray praised the video for "neatly [expanding] on the song's lyrical anxiety." Jordan Darville of The Fader noted the video showed Healy "living out the song's agoraphobic lyrics in a digital-age Howard Hughes-esque hermitage." Writing for NME, Patrick Clarke declared the visual "spellbinding". Lilly Pace of Billboard called the video "psychedelic".

== Credits and personnel ==
Credits adapted from Notes on a Conditional Form album liner notes.

- Matthew Healy – composer, producer, recording engineer, vocals, background vocals
- George Daniel – composer, producer, recording engineer, drums, harp, piano, synthesiser, vibraphone
- Adam Hann – composer, guitar
- Ross MacDonald – composer
- Roy Hargrove – trumpet
- Jonathan Gilmore – recording engineer
- Robin Schmidt – mastering engineer
- Mike Crossey – mixer

== Charts ==
Chart (2019)	Peak position
Ireland (IRMA)	69
New Zealand Hot Singles (RMNZ)	28
UK Singles (Official Charts)	54
US Hot Rock & Alternative Songs (Billboard)	17

== Release history ==
Region	Date	Format	Label(s)	Ref.
Various	24 October 2019	Digital download; streaming	Dirty Hit; Polydor	
United Kingdom	25 October 2019	Contemporary hit radio	Dirty Hit; Polydor	

== See also ==
- The 1975 discography
- List of songs by Matty Healy
