= The 1975 (song) =

2019 song by the 1975

Song by the 1975

from the album Notes on a Conditional Form
- Released: 24 July 2019
- Recorded: June 2019
- Genre: Spoken word; ambient
- Length: 4:55
- Label: Dirty Hit
- Composers: Matthew Healy; George Daniel; Greta Thunberg
- Lyricist: Greta Thunberg
- Producers: Matthew Healy; George Daniel

Visualizer
- "The 1975" on YouTube

"The 1975" is a 2019 song (Note: Some publications initially reported that "The 1975" was a single, including The Daily Telegraph, The Guardian and Spin. However, "People" was later acknowledged as the album's lead single, such as by The Line of Best Fit, Billboard and Rolling Stone.) by the English band of the same name from their fourth studio album, Notes on a Conditional Form. It was released on 24 July 2019, and included on the album as the opening track in May 2020. It continues the tradition of the band's albums opening with an eponymous song, but whereas the previous three had a shared set of lyrics sung by Matty Healy, the 2019 song uses different lyrics delivered by the environmental activist Greta Thunberg. She calls for civil disobedience in response to climate change, to reduce greenhouse gas emissions, in a modified version of her speech "Our House Is on Fire" from the 2019 World Economic Forum.

The song was recorded in June 2019. Proceeds went to the grassroots movement Extinction Rebellion and the song's release coincided with measures by the band to reduce their environmental impact. When touring in 2019 and 2020, prior to COVID-19 lockdowns, the band opened their encore with "The 1975". The song received mostly positive reviews from music critics, who praised its emotional impact, the message and the transition on Notes on a Conditional Form from the song into the lead single "People".

== Background and recording ==
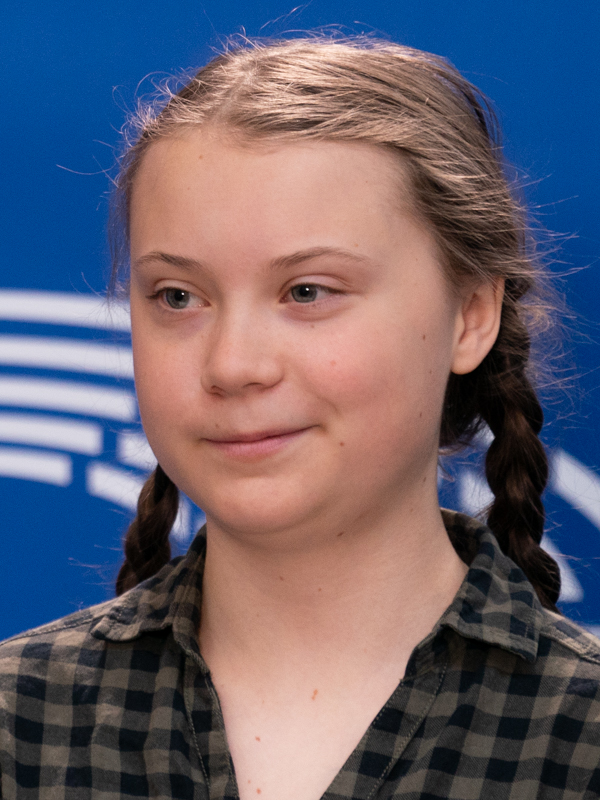
The Swedish climate activist Greta Thunberg is featured on the track.

"The 1975" features the Swedish climate activist Greta Thunberg, who began missing school on Fridays in August 2018 to protest outside the Swedish Riksdag (parliament) with a sign reading "Skolstrejk för klimatet" ("School strike for the climate"). In November 2018, this sparked a global movement of climate strikes. Aged 16 at the time of the song's release, she was the first featured artist on a recording by the 1975; the band had previously criticised that guest appearances in music were primarily intended to improve chart positioning.

The song was produced under the label Dirty Hit, which was founded by the 1975's manager Jamie Oborne. According to Oborne, the lead vocalist Matty Healy wanted to use his platform to highlight other voices, and named Thunberg as the "most important person in the world". Healy later said that the band wanted to make "the most modern statement" on the opening track, and that he wanted Thunberg—whom he considered "the voice of this generation"—to be documented in pop culture and recorded on vinyl. After Oborne failed to contact Thunberg via Instagram, his publicist introduced him to the environmental editor of The Guardian, who put him in contact with her father Svante Thunberg. Thunberg recorded "The 1975" in Stockholm, Sweden, in late June 2019, as the band were travelling through Sweden to play at festivals. Oborne and Healy stated that more influential artists than them turned down an opportunity to work with Thunberg. Greta Thunberg said of the track, her first musical work, that she appreciated the ability to reach "a broad new audience in a new way". Healy said that meeting Thunberg was "such an inspiration" and that she was "the most punk, the most badass person" he had ever met.

== Composition ==
"The 1975"
The final lines of the song, in which Thunberg calls for civil disobedience, with ambient music as backing

The band's first three albums begin with a brief self-titled song with the same set of lyrics about oral sex, beginning "Go down / Soft sound", sung by Healy. The musical styles of each version set the tone for that album. On Notes on a Conditional Form, the opening song deviates from the standard set of lyrics. Lasting 4 minutes and 57 seconds, "The 1975" is a protest song and a work of ambient music, where Thunberg delivers a spoken word performance.

The lyrics call for civil disobedience to bring about reduction of greenhouse gas emissions in response to climate change, based on the January 2019 speech "Our House Is on Fire", which Thunberg delivered at the World Economic Forum. Thunberg opens: "We are right now in the beginning of a climate and ecological crisis". She warns that humans are failing to solve the problem, and outlines the consequences of such a failure, but says that it is not too late to change. She says that the rules in place need to be changed and urges rebellion. Thunberg's tone is calm throughout. In the background, minimal ambient music plays, including piano and string instrumentation. According to Healy, they considered a version with no backing music, but they chose to include it to add emotion and make the listener "transported to a different place". He said that "the blend of the music and her truth is the ultimate combination".

"The 1975" marks a shift by the band to more explicitly political messages. It follows political songs from A Brief Inquiry into Online Relationships, such as "Love It If We Made It"—about contemporary political events—and "I Like America & America Likes Me"—about American gun control. Healy described the song as superficially beautiful but also sad and ominous.

== Release and promotion ==
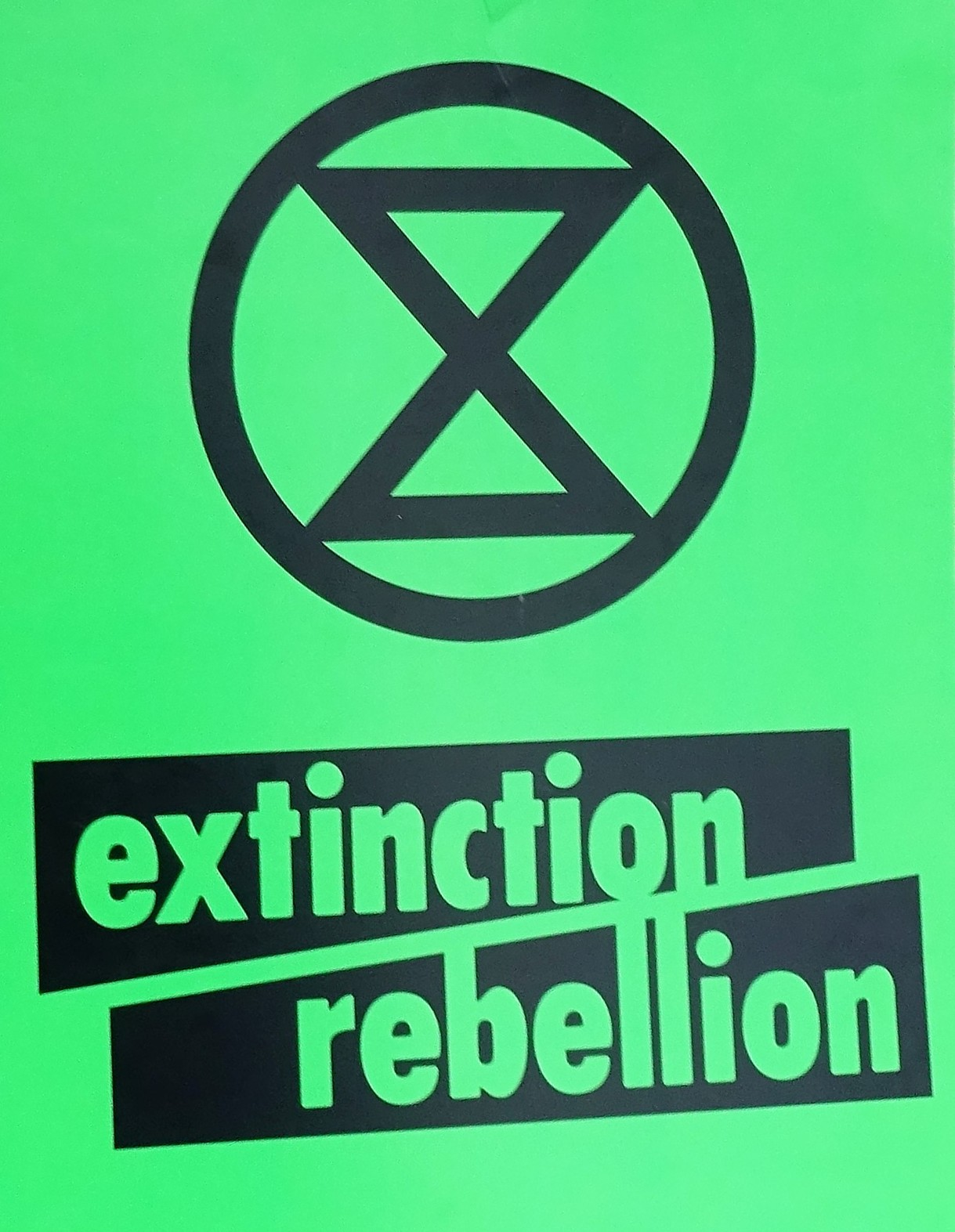
Placard used by Extinction Rebellion, which received proceeds from "The 1975"

"The 1975" is the opening song on the 1975's fourth album, Notes on a Conditional Form. Healy initially said that the band were choosing between three songs to release on 31 May 2019 as the lead single of the album. However, "The 1975" was the first song to be released, on 24 July 2019, and the lead single "People" debuted on 22 August. As they have done for previous releases, the band deactivated their social media accounts shortly before the publishing of "The 1975". The band initially intended not to release "The 1975" prior to the album, but after its recording, they decided to do so. Oborne said that the song "just wasn't a statement that could wait" and that holding it back would have made it feel like a "vanity exercise".

At the time of its release, the 1975 were alternating between touring and working on Notes on a Conditional Form, and "The 1975" was one of four songs that were complete or close to complete, alongside "The Birthday Party", "Frail State of Mind" and "People". Al Horner of The Daily Telegraph observed that the Conservative politician Theresa Villiers—who previously voted against initiatives to limit carbon emissions—became the UK Environment Secretary on the day of the release. According to Oborne, shortly before the release he was contacted by an unusual number of tabloids, and following it they began to run fabricated stories about Healy's relationship and drug usage. The Conservative politician David TC Davies—who has made incorrect claims about climate change in Parliament—called the band hypocritical for their upcoming tour, due to its carbon emission cost. Oborne said in May 2020 that he was still surprised by the "hate and negativity" that Healy received over the collaboration, describing him as "a bit weary of being that guy who fights for the underdog and gets a lot of abuse".

At Thunberg's request, proceeds from "The 1975" were donated to the grassroots movement Extinction Rebellion. Spokespeople from Extinction Rebellion praised the track, saying that "music has the power to break through barriers". A BBC journalist noted that the band were scheduled to tour a wide number of countries, flying by plane, at the time of the song's release. However, contemporaneously with the song's debut, the record label and band announced measures to reduce their environmental impact, such as substitution of plastic materials by paper. The band had also hired an eco-management company for performances.

The 1975 played recordings of the song to open the band's encore throughout performances in 2019 and 2020. Healy would return to the stage alone and turn his back to the audience as it played. Such performances included some touring for A Brief Inquiry into Online Relationships, the Reading and Leeds Festivals in August 2019, the BB&T Pavilion in New Jersey in November 2019, and shows at the Manchester Arena and London O2 Arena during February 2020. Liverpool Echo reported that one audience were told to be quiet for the song. The COVID-19 pandemic led to disruption of planned appearances following Notes on a Conditional Form's release, such as an event at London's Finsbury Park in July 2020, where the 1975 planned to implement a number of environmental measures.

== Critical reception ==
On 27 July 2019, Consequence of Sound named the song their favourite of the week. Sean Lang from the publication approved that Healy let Thunberg give the speech, rather than trying to deliver the message himself, and lauded Thunberg for her communication of a difficult message. Relatedly, Laura Snapes from The Guardian praised the 1975 for using their platform to highlight a woman's voice, and Horner said the music was "careful to never overpower or distract" from Thunberg. Claire Biddles of The Line of Best Fit commented that the "introspective and coy" background music complemented the weight of Thunberg's speech. However, New Statesman's Ellen Peirson-Hagger panned a perceived lack of involvement by the band in their own song, both in its composition and in acting upon its message. A writer for the BBC viewed the song as light on concrete suggestions, but direct on messaging.

Jake Kerridge of The Daily Telegraph praised it as the "most terrifying" spoken word pop music since the 1984 anti-nuclear war song "Two Tribes", by Frankie Goes to Hollywood. GQ's Olive Pometsy called the recording "a wake-up call", saying that people need to work together to sustain the planet's habitability. Lang called the song a "surprising, refreshing risk", while Horner found the track inspiring and "brutally, rebelliously stark". Lizzie Manno of Paste believed it made an "unwavering case for radical change". A number of critics felt emotional when listening to the song, including Dillon Eastoe of Gigwise, who had to "pull over and cry" upon first hearing it in the car, and Madison Feller of Elle, who got chills from the song. Mitch Mosk of Atwood Magazine and The Big Issue's Malcolm Jack found it stirring.

The recording also received positive commentary in context as the opening song on Notes on a Conditional Form. Several critics enjoyed the transition between "The 1975" and the punk rock song "People", including Claire Shaffer of Rolling Stone and Manno; Insider's Callie Ahlgrim lauded that "the effect is exquisite". Writing for Insider, Courteney Larocca praised that it quickly distinguishes the album from the 1975's previous releases. The SLUG Magazine writer Paige Zuckerman found it "a more mature, evolved iteration" of the 1975's lead tracks, but Manno questioned what purpose it served on the album. At the Reading and Leeds Festivals, the song was followed by "Love It If We Made It"; Adam White of The Independent found this continuation to bring "greater potency" to "The 1975".

== Personnel ==
Credits adapted from the album's liner notes and Pitchfork.

- Matthew Healy – keyboards, producing, writing
- George Daniel – keyboards, mixing, producing, programming, strings, writing
- Jonathan Gilmore – engineering
- Robin Schmidt – mastering
- Greta Thunberg – vocals, writing

== See also ==
- The 1975 discography
- List of songs by Matty Healy
