= Guys (song) =

2020 single by The 1975

Single by the 1975

from the album Notes on a Conditional Form
- Released: 13 May 2020
- Recorded: 2019
- Genre: Indie rock; pop rock
- Length: 4:30
- Label: Dirty Hit; Polydor
- Songwriters: Matthew Healy; George Daniel; Adam Hann; Ross MacDonald
- Producers: Matthew Healy; George Daniel; Jonathan Gilmore

The 1975 singles chronology
"If You're Too Shy (Let Me Know)" (2020)	"Guys" (2020)	"Spinning" (2021)

Music video
- "Guys" on YouTube

"Guys" is a song by English band the 1975. It was released on 13 May 2020 through Dirty Hit and Polydor Records as the seventh and final single from their fourth studio album, Notes on a Conditional Form (2020). The song was written by band members Matty Healy, George Daniel, Adam Hann and Ross MacDonald. Production of the track was handled by Daniel and Healy alongside Jonathan Gilmore. "Guys" is a mid-tempo indie rock and pop rock ballad that celebrates the band's nearly two decades of friendship, described by Healy as an ode to platonic love and an answer song to "Girls" (2013).

Contemporary music critics reacted favourably to "Guys", highlighting the song's simplicity, sentimentality, and placement as the final track on Notes on a Conditional Form. The single achieved moderate success on worldwide music charts, peaking at number 17 on the US Billboard Hot Rock & Alternative Songs chart, number 40 on the New Zealand Hot Singles chart, number 85 in Scotland, and number 96 on the UK Singles Chart. A music video for "Guys" was released on 21 May 2020. It is a compilation of archival footage from the 1975's formative years to the present-day.

== Background and development ==
"[...] I think that there is a lot of jokes and winks and this and that on my records. And I think that this song was a bit of an antidote for all of that. It’s just nice to have one moment of pure, genuine soppy, naive sentimentality. That is a massive ingredient in being a person."

— Healy, on the song's sentimentality.

"Guys" was one of the last songs created for Notes on a Conditional Form. It was written as a celebration of their years spent together, having formed the band at the age of 13. Healy wanted to write a love song but make it an ode to friendship rather than a romantic story. He noted a perceived lack of platonic love songs dealing with the formative importance of friendships, especially among heterosexual men. Thus, Healy wrote "Guys" as an answer song to "Girls" (2013) from their self-titled debut album (2013), saying he "wanted people to have a love song for their mates." Healy told Zane Lowe of Beats 1 that "Guys" came about "quite easily" owing to the simplicity of the production and emotional lyrics. He made a conscious effort not to make the lyrics ironic or sardonic, choosing instead to embrace sentimentality, allowing himself to feel exposed. Regarding the inspiration behind the song, the singer said it stemmed from conversations the band would have, imagining the difficulties faced by solo artists and sharing their gratefulness for having each other. Healy elaborated further, saying: "[...] we've been a band since we were 13, and they're my best friends. And we've never fallen out. It's a really true song. They're the thing that gives me purpose."

== Music and lyrics ==
"Guys"
A 27-second sample of "Guys" showcasing the song's chorus, with Healy expressing love for his bandmates.

"Guys" has a length of four minutes and thirty seconds. Musically, it is a mid-tempo indie rock and pop rock ballad, incorporating a stripped-down production consisting of soft guitars and violins. Megan Tkacy of Soundigest noted the song featured a subdued, relaxed, and stripped-down composition, omitting the band's characteristic musical elements such as synthesizers, soulful choirs, and production effects. Lyrically, "Guys" is a reflection of the band's journey from teenagers to the present. Healy reminisces on an apartment they rented together, bringing him to tears as he realises his bandmates are the "loves" of his life ("Right then I realized / You're the love of my life"). The singer expresses nostalgia for the band's formative years, wishing to relive the experience: "'Cause we all shared one apartment / Man, they were the golden times / They were the best of my life". In the chorus, Healy sings: "Yeah, the moment that we started a band / Was the best thing that ever happened / And I wish that we could do it again / It was the best thing that ever happened to me". George Cowell of Platform Magazine called it "a grounded, personal and powerful commentary on love", while Brittany Spanos of Rolling Stone called it "a love letter to the band's nearly two decades of friendship." The song is performed in the key of F♯ major with a tempo of 102 beats per minute in common time.

== Reception ==
Andrew Sacher of BrooklynVegan said "Guys" was "good stuff" and welcomed a return to the band's "somber, jangly, indie rock side." In her review of the single for Rolling Stone, Spanos called the song "touching" and earnest. Dana Tetenburg of Euphoria said: "[...] in a world with an abundance of songs dedicated to romantic love, a song that acknowledges the love you have for your friends comes as a rather refreshing moment." The Edge critic Alice Fortt gave the song 3 out of 5 stars, complimenting the intimate and personal lyrics, and deemed it straightforward but genuine. Tkacy of Soundigest praised the placement of "Guys" as the album's closing track and said it was "soulful, heartfelt and sure to stay in your head." Stereogum contributor Ryan Leas said "Guys" was characteristically "1975-esque". He noted that unlike many of the band's other songs, it did not require listeners to search for a deeper meaning, saying the track was "just a great, earnest song that's likely to make you reflect on your own friendships".

Dan Stubbs of NME called "Guys" sweet and sentimental. Consequence of Sound writer Samantha Small said the song would be a "live-show winner" and wrote it was "easy to imagine fans swaying and repeating the endearing lines." Ian Gormely of Exclaim! opined: "The track pines for the simplicity of the group's earliest days, mates playing music for the love of it and one another". In his review of Notes on a Conditional Form for Pitchfork, Sam Sodomsky declared "Guys" the most romantic song on the album, deeming it as "an unlikely ode to consistency from a songwriter who has spent his career at war with this very notion." Lindsay Zoladz of The New York Times said the track was an example of the parent album's overarching desire to return to youthfulness, innocence, and privacy. She called "Guys" a "sweetly sad song about yearning to get back to the garden, or maybe just the garage." Variety contributor Chris Willman said the song was unpretentious, a contrast with Notes on a Conditional Form opener "The 1975" (2019), which he deemed portentous. Commercially, "Guys" reached number 96 on the UK Singles Chart, number 85 in Scotland, number 17 on the US Billboard Hot Rock & Alternative Songs chart and number 40 on the New Zealand Hot Singles chart.

== Promotion and music video ==
Prior to its release, the 1975 debuted "Guys" in Nottingham, England, on 15 February 2020, the opening night of their Music for Cars Tour in the UK. The band performed the song in front of archival footage displaying clips from their youth and formative years together. A music video for "Guys" was released on 21 May 2020. It features a compilation of video clips of the 1975 captured over the past decade. The footage shows the band on tour, recording music, and behind-the-scenes on magazine shoots. The Dork editorial staff called it "a heartfelt trip down memory lane from a band who've gone from early days playing pub backrooms to standing as one of the biggest on the planet."

== Credits and personnel ==
Credits adapted from Notes on a Conditional Form album liner notes.

- Matthew Healy – composer, producer, guitar, vocals
- George Daniel – composer, producer, background vocals, drums, synthesiser
- Adam Hann – composer, guitar
- Ross MacDonald – composer, bass
- Jonathan Gilmore – producer, recording engineer
- Robin Schmidt – mastering engineer
- Mike Crossey – mixer

== Charts ==
Chart (2020)	Peak position
New Zealand Hot Singles (RMNZ)	40
Scotland Singles (OCC)	85
UK Singles (OCC)	96
US Hot Rock & Alternative Songs (Billboard)	17

== See also ==
- The 1975 discography
- List of songs by Matty Healy
