= Nothing Revealed / Everything Denied =

Song by English band the 1975

Song by the 1975

from the album Notes on a Conditional Form
- Released: 22 May 2020
- Genre: Neo soul; electro-gospel; R&B
- Length: 3:38
- Label: Dirty Hit; Polydor
- Songwriters: Matthew Healy; George Daniel; Adam Hann; Ross MacDonald
- Producers: Matthew Healy; George Daniel

Visualiser video
- "Nothing Revealed / Everything Denied" on YouTube

"Nothing Revealed / Everything Denied" is a song by English band the 1975 from their fourth studio album, Notes on a Conditional Form (2020). The song was written by band members Matty Healy, George Daniel, Adam Hann and Ross MacDonald, while the production was handled by Daniel and Healy. The London Community Gospel Choir provide the song's choir vocals. Its creation was inspired by J Dilla and self-reflection, with the band wanting to fulfill their responsibilities as artists by challenging ideas.

An experimental neo soul, electro-gospel and R&B song, "Nothing Revealed / Everything Denied" combines elements of jazz, spoken word, soul, blue-eyed soul, gospel and hip hop. The song's production primarily consists of a lo-fi groove, jazz-influenced chords and a blues-influenced piano riff. Detailing Healy's search for truth in the world, the song's lyrics criticise other celebrities for financially exploiting their fans while also disavowing the 1975's own lyrics from "Love It If We Made It" and "Heart Out".

Upon release, "Nothing Revealed / Everything Denied" received generally positive reviews from contemporary music critics, with several deeming it an album highlight. Reviewers praised the song's lyrics, production and sonic experimentation, noting it serves as a deconstruction of the 1975's mythology. The song peaked at number 82 on the UK Singles Chart and number 28 on the New Zealand Hot Singles chart. An accompanying music video, created by Joey Holder, was released on 12 July 2020. Inspired by the novel The Book of Pleasure: Psychology of Ecstasy (1913) by Austin Osman Spare, the visual features sigils and positive affirmations layered over footage of snakes, eels, nematodes and sacred diagrams.

== Background and development ==
"It's a very unique vocal delivery on ['Nothing Revealed / Everything Denied']. I wouldn't call it rapping, it’s just flow. I get to kind of flow and rhythmically punctuate with words."

— Healy, on his vocal delivery in "Nothing Revealed / Everything Denied".

In April 2017, the 1975 announced Music For Cars, the follow-up record to their second studio album I Like It When You Sleep, for You Are So Beautiful yet So Unaware of It (2016), with it being set for release in 2018. However, in May 2018, Healy announced that Music For Cars would now represent an "era" composed of two studio albums. The first, A Brief Inquiry into Online Relationships (2018), was released in November of the same year. The band began recording the second album Notes on a Conditional Form, prior to the release of A Brief Inquiry into Online Relationships. Recording continued through 2019 during their Music for Cars Tour, intending to release it in May 2019. Healy deferred the album's release several times, scheduling it for 21 February 2020 and later for 24 April. Regarding the delays, the singer said they were caused by giving interviewers arbitrary release dates. Ultimately, Notes on a Conditional Form was released on 22 May 2020.

The origin of "Nothing Revealed / Everything Denied" came from a piano piece created by Daniel while the producer was "jamming". Healy then added a low-resolution breakbeat over the piece, creating a simple loop that allowed the pair to "kind of just go into producer mode"–inspired by the work of J Dilla. Regarding the production process, the singer said parts of the song's creation were "really fun for [them]". Lyrically, he said the track was meant to be a self-reflection and a fulfillment of their artistic responsibility. Healy noted that many artists fail to take a stance on issues or challenge any ideas, relying on association and projection to make themselves interesting. Elaborating further, the singer said: "[I]f you give people nothing to work with, if you say nothing, then you leave room for people to project anything." "Nothing Revealed / Everything Denied" was written by Daniel, Healy, Hann and MacDonald, while the production was handled by Daniel and Healy.

== Music and lyrics ==
"Nothing Revealed / Everything Denied"
A 22-second sample of "Nothing Revealed / Everything Denied", showcasing the song's chorus. Healy sings in his falsetto over a lo-fi hip hop groove, jazz-influenced chords, a blues-influenced piano riff and a gospel choir provided by the London Community Gospel Choir.

Musically, "Nothing Revealed / Everything Denied" is an experimental neo soul, electro-gospel and R&B piano ballad, and has a length of three minutes and 38 seconds (3:38). The song has a brass and piano-driven instrumentation, while the production is composed of a soulful lo-fi hip hop groove, a "vibrant" bassline, jazz-influenced chords, a blues-influenced piano riff and a gospel choir performed by the London Community Gospel Choir. The track also contains elements of jazz, spoken word, soul, blue-eyed soul, gospel and hip hop. Healy's vocal delivery in "Nothing Revealed / Everything Denied" alternates between rapping and singing in his falsetto. During the rap portion of the song, Healy's voice undergoes a deep grime-inspired manipulation, which Callie Ahlgrim of Insider compared to English rapper Stormzy.

Lyrically, "Nothing Revealed / Everything Denied" narrates Healy's search for the truth in an increasingly confusing world. He confesses to embellishing in his previous songs and dismantles the lies and misconceptions about himself from their lyrics. "Nothing Revealed / Everything Denied" begins with an angsty hymn, while the first verse opens with Healy admitting "I never fucked in a car, I was lying / I do it on my bed, lying down, not trying", which disavows the opening lines of "Love It If We Made It" (2018) and "Sex" (2013). Using sentimental tones, the singer confesses to apathy while equating existential ennui with asking for sex. Elsewhere, he describes being too tired and bored to live a lifestyle expected of him, while lambasting other celebrities for their greed, rapping in a low-pitched voice: "You don't fuck with your poor fans / You need the rich ones to expand your floor plans." The song breaks into a choir-led plea, which Larry Fitzmaurice of Entertainment Weekly compared to Listen Without Prejudice Vol. 1 (1990) by George Michael, singing: "Life feels like a lie / I need something to be true / Is there anybody out there?"

== Reception ==
Upon release, "Nothing Revealed / Everything Denied" was met with positive reviews from contemporary music critics, with some deeming it a highlight from Notes on a Conditional Form. Mitch Mosk of Atwood Magazine declared the song an album highlight and included it as his Editor's Pick, praising the "grandeur and utter beauty" while noting the song explores "groundbreaking" sonic territory for the 1975. He commended the track's lyrics, passionate emotions, "lush harmonies and aching, heartfelt tones". Writing for The Guardian, Kitty Empire called "Nothing Revealed / Everything Denied" the album's "key track", deeming it a "subtly" updated version of U2's "I Still Haven’t Found What I’m Looking For" (1987). Paul Schrodt of Slant Magazine called the song one of the album's "[m]ore successful curveballs". The A.V. Club writer Annie Zaleski deemed the track one of the strongest songs from Notes on a Conditional Form, saying it eschews "big-picture statements and instead confronts anxiety about personal malaise and isolation".

Conrad Duncan of Under the Radar described "Nothing Revealed / Everything Denied" as a "burst of light-footed neo-soul". He noted the song exemplifies Notes on a Conditional Form's overall rejection of Healy's former theatrics, specifically by dismantling the 1975's most acclaimed line from "Love It If We Made It". Additionally, Duncan called the track the emotional centrepiece of the album, saying it is an example of where "[t]he 1975 are at their best, combining self-deprecating humor with sharp radio-friendly hooks". Paste writer Lizzie Manno said "Nothing Revealed / Everything Denied" recalls the distorted hip hop of the band's "I Like America & America Likes Me" (2018) and the gospel vocals of "It's Not Living (If It's Not with You)" (2018), while Elly Watson of DIY similarly praised it as a "clever" throwback to "Love It If We Made It".

Justin Curto of Vulture said "Nothing Revealed / Everything Denied" encompasses "everything worth loving (or loathing) about [t]he 1975", while praising the lyrics, production and unexpected rapping. Fitzmaurice called the song's choir vocals "beautiful", while Clash writer Brenton Blanchet said the track's bridge "encapsulates the ultra-powered, multi-dimensional superhero of an album". On a similar note, Ross Horton of musicOMH called it "another winner" for the band. Writing for Exclaim!, Ian Gormely interpreted "Nothing Revealed / Everything Denied" to be a deconstruction of the 1975's own mythology, saying Healy "picks apart the lies and misconceptions about himself from past lyrics". Similarly, Dan Stubbs of NME said Healy is "bent on deconstructing the entire artifice of his carefully curated persona", while Beats Per Minute writer Lauren Mullineaux said Healy debunks his "self-mythologising" nature. Similarly, Pitchfork's Sam Sodomsky called the song a "self-referential cry into the void about fame". Commercially, "Nothing Revealed / Everything Denied" reached number 82 on the UK Singles Chart and number 28 on the New Zealand Hot Singles chart.

== Music video ==
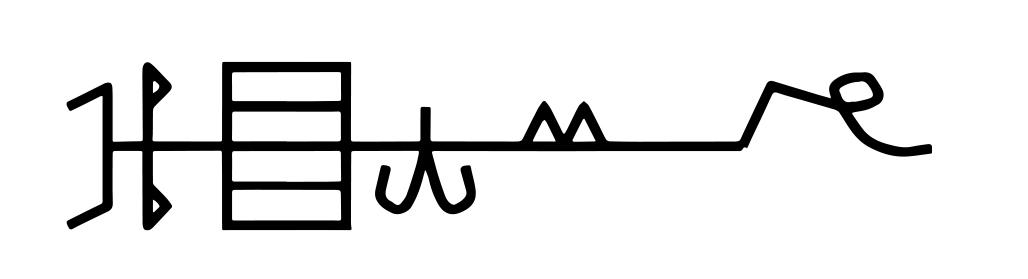
Joey Holder incorporates sigils into her video for "Nothing Revealed / Everything Denied".

An accompanying music video, created by Joey Holder, was released on 12 July 2020. The visual serves as the 11th release from Artists Respond to NOACF, an online art exhibition released in lieu of their planned Music for Cars Tour. To create the video, Holder took inspiration from the occult and the novel The Book of Pleasure: Psychology of Ecstasy (1913) by Austin Osman Spare. She began by segmenting the song into eight verses and then extracting positive affirmations from each: "Life is a search for your truth", "sexual sorcery", "returns and unites", "free at any time", "revealed by all systems", "forget dependence, "somewhere unlearnt" and "what you wish to believe can be true". The filmmaker used Spare's sigil-making technique to develop a symbol for each of the eight affirmations. The video features the eight reoccurring symbols and affirmations layered over footage of sacred diagrams, squirming snakes, eels and nematodes, which form the shapes of the symbols. The visual also includes a moon, meant to represent the eight lunar phases which hold importance for chaos magic. Regarding the meaning of the video, the 1975 asserted that it is intended to remind viewers of "the central role music played in old pagan ceremonies and rituals".

== Credits and personnel ==
Credits adapted from Notes on a Conditional Form album liner notes.

- Matthew Healy – composer, producer, guitar, vocals
- George Daniel – composer, producer, drums, keyboards, synthesizer
- Adam Hann – composer
- Ross MacDonald – composer, bass
- Jamie Squire – keyboards, guitar, piano
- London Community Gospel Choir – choir vocals
- Jonathan Gilmore – recording engineer
- Robin Schmidt – mastering engineer
- Mike Crossey – mixer

== Charts ==
Chart performance for "Nothing Revealed / Everything Denied"
Chart (2020)	Peak position
New Zealand Hot Singles (RMNZ)	28
UK Singles (Official Charts)	82

== See also ==
- The 1975 discography
- List of songs by Matty Healy
