= People (The 1975 song) =

Single by the 1975

from the album Notes on a Conditional Form
- Released: 22 August 2019
- Genre: Anarcho-punk; screamo; industrial rock
- Length: 2:40
- Label: Dirty Hit; Polydor
- Songwriters: Matthew Healy; George Daniel; Adam Hann; Ross MacDonald
- Producers: Matthew Healy; George Daniel; Jonathan Gilmore

The 1975 singles chronology
"It's Not Living (If It's Not with You)" (2018)	"People" (2019)	"Frail State of Mind" (2019)

Music video
- "People" on YouTube

"People" is a song by English band the 1975 from their fourth studio album, Notes on a Conditional Form (2020). The song was released on 22 August 2019, through Dirty Hit and Polydor Records as the lead single from the album. It was written by band members Matty Healy, George Daniel, Adam Hann and Ross MacDonald. Production of the song was handled by Daniel and Healy alongside Jonathan Gilmore. An anarcho-punk and screamo song, it features an intense, heavy rock instrumentation consisting of desert-rock guitar riffs, straightforward chords, breakneck drums and "renegade" percussion. Lyrically, it is a protest song that calls for change and rebellion to deal with global, political and environmental turmoil, and deals with themes of desperation, urgency and anxiety.

Upon release, "People" received positive reviews from contemporary music critics, although fan reaction was generally mixed. Reviewers praised the heavier rock-indebted sound, Healy's vocal delivery and the sonic departure from the band's third studio album, A Brief Inquiry into Online Relationships (2018). Commercially, the song achieved moderate success on worldwide music charts. In the 1975's native United Kingdom, the song peaked at number 54 on the UK Singles Chart, number 59 in Scotland and topped the UK Rock & Metal chart. Internationally, the song reached number 15 on the US Billboard Hot Rock & Alternative Songs chart, number 36 in New Zealand and number 68 in Ireland. A music video for the song was released on 22 August 2019. It features the band performing inside of a cube composed of LED screens and was compared to Marilyn Manson and the Joker.

== Background and recording ==
"'People' is about young voices of progression being drowned out by old regressive ideals. It sounds and feels like anger and momentum, like falling forward."

— Healy, on the meaning behind "People".

Healy told Dan Stubbs of NME that "People" was influenced by Converge, Minor Threat and Gorilla Biscuits—bands he grew up listening to. He wrote the song with the goal of performing it at Reading. The singer revealed the song's origins stemmed from an experience in June 2019 at the Hangout Music Festival in Gulf Shores, Alabama. At the festival, Healy spoke about Alabama's controversial ban on abortions, saying:

"The reason I'm so angry is I don't believe it's about the preservation of life, it's about controlling women [...] It's not about that – you can hide behind that as much as you want and push your Christian narrative that sex is something to be ashamed of and therefore forcing women to have birth is some kind of – I don't know – some good punishment for their moral indiscretion. You are a disgrace! You are not men of god! You are simply misogynistic wankers."

Several audience members in the crowd became visibly upset during his speech, booing and throwing objects at the 1975. Healy responded to the hecklers by saying: "Boo me? Fucking shoot me, I don't give a fuck". The 1975 were advised to consider quickly leaving Alabama, having been notified of a higher threat level due to it being an open carry state. Healy was furious and wrote "People" immediately after the event on their tour bus while travelling through Texas. On 24 July 2019, the band released the opening song on Notes on a Conditional Form, "The 1975". Featuring a speech from Swedish climate change activist Greta Thunberg, the track calls for civil disobedience and rebellion to achieve a reduction of greenhouse gas emissions. Nearly one month later, the 1975 released "People" as the first official single from Notes on a Conditional Form on 22 August 2019.

== Music and lyrics ==
"People"
A 16-second sample of "People", with Healy singing in an aggressive screaming tone.

Musically, "People" is an anarcho-punk and screamo song with a length of two minutes and 40 seconds (2:40). The track incorporates elements of industrial music, alternative rock, industrial rock and punk rock subgenres such as dance-punk and glam punk. It has an intense, heavy rock instrumentation built upon desert-rock guitar riffs, straightforward chords, breakneck drums and "renegade" percussion. Chris DeVille of Stereogum compared the song's aggressive, "serrated noise-punk onslaught" to Liars, LCD Soundsystem, Death from Above and Metz. Thomas Smith of NME called it the band's "heaviest" and most confrontational song released to date, commenting that its use of punk-rock was evocative of Queens of the Stone Age and saying the song's use of "pop sensibilities" were similar to Elastica. Sarah Jamieson of DIY called the track "deliciously divisive ... dirty and deranged", and viewed it as a melting pot of musical influences from Death from Above, Refused and Primal Scream.

Lyrically, "People" is a protest song that calls for change and rebellion. It describes the emotions of the millennial generation living through global, political and environmental upheaval—including desperation, urgency and anxiety. Healy's vocal delivery on the track was described by Quinn Moreland of Pitchfork as "barking, shrieking, and snarling". The song begins with a screaming call in which he demands people wake up: "Wake up! Wake up! Wake up! It's Monday morning!" Healy condemns both personal and systemic inaction ("Stop fucking with the kids"), appeals for the younger generation to create change ("We are appalling and we need to stop just watching shit in bed / And I know it sounds boring and we like things that are funny / But we need to get this in our fucking heads") and highlights the imminent danger of the global climate crisis ("It's Monday morning and we've only got a thousand of them left"). Lindsey Smith of iHeartRadio commented that "People" embraces the angst and political themes common in punk music, while Samantha Small of Consequence of Sound felt the song's purpose is to: "[tell] listeners to pay attention to the debilitating stasis of the world".

== Reception ==
"People" was met with positive reviews from contemporary music critics, although the response from the 1975's fanbase was more mixed. Andrew Magnotta of iHeartRadio deemed the song a musical departure from the band's regular sound, saying Healy sounds like "he's screaming himself hoarse with a diatribe against willful ignorance, laziness and the anxiety that comes with it". Brittany Spanos of Rolling Stone called the song a sonic departure and noted a continuation of the political undertones present in "The 1975". Dylan Haas of Euphoria saw the former as a radical departure from the 1975's typical music, but thematically connected it to "The 1975", saying: "'People' is hardcore. It's angry. It's the kind of tune you want to shout at the top of your lungs whilst moshing or breaking a skateboard." Similarly, Marissa Lorusso of NPR felt the song shares the same political sentiment of "The 1975" and said it has an "unmatched level of gut-churning urgency".

Derrick Rossignol of Uproxx praised the use of rock music in "People", highlighting its instrumentation and Healy's passionate vocal performance. In his review of the song for Pitchfork, Moreland lauded the track for Healy's vocal performance and themes, saying: "If there's still any question about whether or not the 1975 is a rock band, rather than an '80s-indebted pop act, 'People' will put that debate to rest." Shahlin Graves of Coup de Main deemed the song a "must-listen". Cerys Kenneally from The Line of Best Fit called the song "punchy" and "definitely a heavier listen compared to their previous album". Andrew Sacher of BrooklynVegan called the song "pretty awesome". In his review of the song for NME, Smith said it is, "A push-back to the naysayers and the critics who dismiss them throwaway pop music, and an act of self-vandalisation to rip it up and start again. They want to start a revolution, man."

In the 1975's native country of the United Kingdom, the song topped the UK Rock & Metal chart while also reaching number 54 on the UK Singles Chart and number 59 in Scotland. Commercially, "People" performed modestly on worldwide music charts. Internationally, the song peaked at number 15 on the US Billboard Hot Rock & Alternative Songs, number 36 in New Zealand and number 68 in Ireland.

== Music video ==
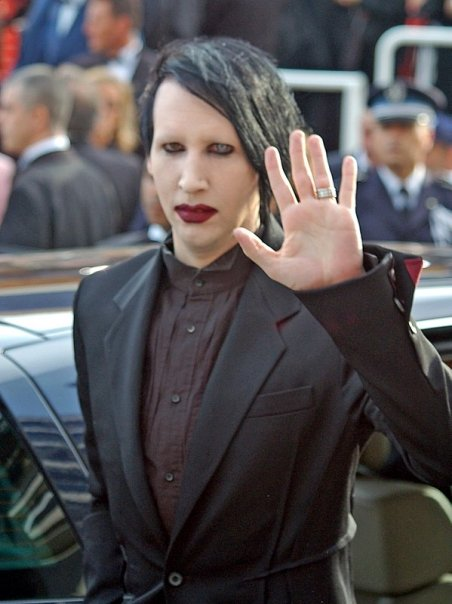
Healy's appearance in the song's music video was compared to that of Marilyn Manson (pictured).

A music video for "People" was released on 22 August 2019. The video was directed by Healy, Warren Fu and Ben Ditto. Stylist Patricia Villirillo drew inspiration from Frankenstein's monster, punk comic books and anime. The band's suits were meant to reference the music video for "Give Yourself a Try" (2018). Yusuke Morioka, the hairstylist for the video, designed the 1975's hair using a mixture of metal, hardcore, punk and heavy rock influences. To make Healy look real and "a bit toxic", Morioka added a wet texture to his hair, while makeup artist Anne Sophie Costa used gray eye shadow and blue lip gloss. Jon Emmony and Aaron Jablonski of Exit Simulation created several AR filters that are used in the video, with them being meant to represent different aspects of surveillance systems. The first filter has glowing yellow data points, while the second is shown scanning the band members in a "ghostly" way, and the third moved their eyes and mouth to different locations in an effort to avoid recognition. The filters were later made available to download on Instagram.

Beginning with an epilepsy trigger warning, the music video features the 1975 performing inside of a cube with LED walls and musical instruments. The inside of the cube is filled with bright lights, while the screens display internet images and lyrics from the song, mimicking the sensory overload of the online experience. Healy is shown with pale white skin, red-stained lips and long black hair, while several AR filters are superimposed over his face. Throughout the video, he is shown hanging upside down and twitching in irritation. The remaining band members are dressed in matching black and yellow suits; Kirsten Sprunch of Billboard said the band went "full goth". DeVille compared Healy's look to the Joker and Marilyn Manson, with the latter sentiment being shared by Samuel Turner of Dazed. Koltan Greenwood of Alternative Press called the video futuristic. Moreland compared Healy's look in the video to Manson and Gerard Way, saying the visual "has absorbed all the danger and turned it into an anthem".

== Credits and personnel ==
Credits adapted from Notes on a Conditional Form album liner notes.

- Matthew Healy – composer, producer, guitar, vocals
- George Daniel – composer, producer, programming, drums, keyboards, synthesizer
- Adam Hann – composer, guitar
- Ross MacDonald – composer, bass
- Jonathan Gilmore – producer, recording engineer
- Robin Schmidt – mastering engineer
- Mike Crossey – mixer

== Charts ==
Chart performance for "People"
Chart (2019)	Peak position
Ireland (IRMA)	68
New Zealand Hot Singles (RMNZ)	36
Scotland Singles (OCC)	59
UK Singles (OCC)	54
UK Rock & Metal (OCC)	1
US Hot Rock & Alternative Songs (Billboard)	15
US Rock & Alternative Airplay (Billboard)	48

== See also ==
- The 1975 discography
- List of songs by Matty Healy
