= Hiroshi Sato (musician) =

Japanese singer-songwriter

Background information
- Born: June 3, 1947; Chiran, (Current: Minamikyūshū), Kagoshima Prefecture, Japan
- Died: October 24, 2012 (aged 65) Tsuzuki-zu, Yokohama, Kanagawa Prefecture, Japan
- Genres: City pop; electronic; jazz; jazz fusion; J-pop; soft rock
- Occupations: Musician; singer-songwriter
- Years active: 1970–2012
- Labels: Alfa Records; Eastworld
- Website: hiroshi-sato.com

Hiroshi Sato (佐藤博, June 3, 1947 – October 24, 2012) was a Japanese singer-songwriter. He was an influential keyboardist in the Japanese jazz fusion and soft rock scenes during the late 1970s and 1980s, later dubbed "city pop".

== Early life and career ==
Sato was born as the eldest son of a temple family in his home town of Chiran in the Kagoshima Prefecture, and moved to Kyoto in 1949 at the age of two.

During his high school years, Sato obtained a reel-to-reel tape recorder and began learning how to play the bass guitar and drums, recording his work in a garage. At age 20 he began playing the piano, and later stated that "when I was 20 years old, I practiced so much that I was willing to give up the world if I didn't turn pro."

Around 1970, he started his career as a pianist in a jazz band in Osaka, eventually leading to his collaboration with other blues musicians such as the West Road Blues Band and Masaki Ueda, as well as folk musicians such as Kyozo Nishioka as part of "The Dylan", Masaji Otsuka and Ryo Kagawa.

In 1976, along with forming Shigeru Suzuki's short-lived band Huckleback and collaborating with Haruomi Hosono and his friends from Tin Pan Alley, he released his first solo album "SUPER MARKET" through Nippon Columbia.

In the late 1970s, Sato began experimenting with electronic music, collaborating a number of times with electronic pioneer Haruomi Hosono between 1975 and 1978. Sato incorporated electronic musical instruments including polyphonic synthesizers (such as the Yamaha CS-80 and Polymoog) and Roland drum machines in his 1979 album Orient. He was invited to join Hosono's electronic band Yellow Magic Orchestra in 1978, but he declined as he decided to leave Japan in 1979 before returning in 1982. He experimented with the Roland TR-808 drum machine in the early 1980s, but decided to mainly use the Linn LM-1 sample-based drum machine for his 1982 album Awakening.

Sato was an early user of the Roland TR-909 drum machine, released in 1983. In 1984, he used the TR-909 for his album Sailing Blaster, and as a producer for Naomi Akimoto's album Poison 21.

He released 14 total albums up until his hiatus after "Oracle", which was released through Eastworld Records in 1996.

== Discography ==
=== Albums ===
Album	Medium	Release number	Release date	Label	Ref
SUPER MARKET	LP	LQ-7008-C	May 25, 1976	Wave Concept (Nippon Columbia)	
SUPER MARKET	CD	COCA-11141	November 21, 1993	Nippon Columbia	
SUPER MARKET	CD	COR-11141	November 21, 1993	Nippon Columbia	
SUPER MARKET	CD (on demand)	CORR-10298	June 22, 2009	Nippon Columbia	
SUPER MARKET	CD	TWCP-25	November 21, 2012	Tower to the People (Tower Records)	
Time	LP	LX-7009	January 25, 1977	Wave Concept	
Time	CD	ARCD-1002	March 10, 2003	Ardun Records	
Time	CD (on demand)	CORR-10529	December 21, 2009	Nippon Columbia	
Time	CD	TWCP-26	November 21, 2012	Tower to the People	
Time	LP	HMJA-101	April 18, 2015	HMV	
Time	LP		November 3, 2019	Sony Music Entertainment Japan	
ORIENT	LP	MKF-1047	June 1, 1979	Kitty Records	
ORIENT	CD	PROT-1056	March 13, 2013	Universal Music Group	
ORIENT	CD	MKF-1047	December 24, 2014	Kitty Records	
ORIENT	LP	PROT-7002	April 18, 2015	HMV	
ORIENT	LP	WWSLP-12	February 16, 2018	WEWANTSOUNDS	
Awakening	LP	ALR-28036	June 25, 1982	Alfa Records	
Awakening	CD	32XA-91	August 25, 1986	Alfa Records	
Awakening	CD	ALCA-9144	May 10, 1995	Alfa Records	
Awakening	CD	MHCL-648	September 21, 2005	GT Music (Sony Music Direct Japan Inc.)	
Awakening	CD	MHCL-30275	December 10, 2014	Sony Music Entertainment Japan	
Awakening	LP	MHJ7-3	August 24, 2016	Sony Music Entertainment Japan	
Awakening	LP	MHJL-106	November 3, 2019	Sony Music Entertainment Japan	
SAILING BLASTER	LP	ALR-28059	June 25, 1984	Alfa Records	
SAILING BLASTER	CD	32XA-92	1986	Alfa Records	
SAILING BLASTER	CD	ALCA-9145	May 10, 1995	Alfa Records	
SAILING BLASTER	Blu-spec CD2 (paper jacket)	BRIDGE-239	June 3, 2015	Bridge Records	
SOUND OF SCIENCE	LP	ALR-28081	July 25, 1986	Alfa Records	
SOUND OF SCIENCE	CD	32XA-70	August 25, 1986	Alfa Records	
SOUND OF SCIENCE	CD	ALCA-9146	May 10, 1995	Alfa Records	
SOUND OF SCIENCE	Blu-spec CD2 (paper jacket)	BRIDGE-240	June 3, 2015	Bridge Records	
This Boy	LP	ALR-28066	May 25, 1985	Alfa Records	
This Boy	CD	32XA-39	September 10, 1985	Alfa Records	
FUTURE FILE	LP	ALR-28095	May 25, 1987	Alfa Records	
FUTURE FILE	CD	32XA-158	May 25, 1987	Alfa Records	
FUTURE FILE	CD	ALCA-9147	May 10, 1995	Alfa Records	
FUTURE FILE	Blu-spec CD2	MHCL-30310	June 3, 2015	GT Music	
AQUA	LP	ALR-28110	June 25, 1988	Alfa Records	
AQUA	CD	32XA-210	June 25, 1988	Alfa Records	
AQUA	CD	ALCA-9148	May 10, 1995	Alfa Records	
AQUA	Blu-spec CD2	MHCL-30311	June 3, 2015	GT Music	
TOUCH THE HEART	CD	29A2-18	June 25, 1989	Alfa Records	
TOUCH THE HEART	CD	ALCA-9149	May 10, 1995	Alfa Records	
TOUCH THE HEART	Blu-spec CD2	MHCL-30312	June 3, 2015	GT Music	
Good Morning	CD	ALCA-56	July 25, 1990	Alfa Records	
Good Morning	CD	ALCA-9150	May 10, 1995	Alfa Records	
Good Morning	CD	DQCL-684	November 24, 2017	Sony Music Entertainment Japan	
Self Jam	CD	ALCA-159	July 21, 1991	Alfa Records	
Self Jam	CD	ALCA-9151	May 10, 1995	Alfa Records	
Self Jam	Blu-spec CD2	DQCL-685	November 24, 2017	Sony Music Direct Japan, Inc.	
HAPPY & LUCKY	CD	ALCA-494	June 21, 1993	Alfa Records	
HAPPY & LUCKY	CD	ALCA-9152	May 10, 1995	Alfa Records	
HAPPY & LUCKY	Blu-spec CD2	DQCL-686	November 24, 2017	Sony Music Direct Japan, Inc.	
ALL OF ME	CD	TOCT-8882	May 10, 1995	Alfa Records	
ALL OF ME	CD	QIAG-70057	September 8, 2012	Tower to the People	
Oracle	CD	TOCT-9706	November 7, 1996	Universal Music Group	
Oracle	CD	QIAG-70058	September 8, 2012	Tower to the People	
THAT'S ALL RIGHT	CD	SMD-0001	June 24, 2003	Sara Music	
Amazing	LP		January 20, 2004	Sara Music	
AMAZING Vol. II	CD	ECCA-1003	April 5, 2006		
CREAMY AQUA	CD	GHR-0001	Aug 4, 2007	Groovin' High Records	
