= Human Too =

2022 song by The 1975

Song by the 1975

from the album Being Funny in a Foreign Language
- Released: 14 October 2022
- Recorded: 2022
- Studio: Real World Studios; Electric Lady Studios
- Genre: Jazz pop; lo-fi
- Length: 3:44
- Label: Dirty Hit
- Songwriters: Matthew Healy; George Daniel; Jamie Squire; Benjamin Francis Leftwich; Jimmy Hogarth
- Producers: Matthew Healy; George Daniel; Jack Antonoff

"Human Too" is a song by English rock band the 1975. It was released on 14 October 2022 through Dirty Hit as the ninth track on their fifth studio album, Being Funny in a Foreign Language. Written by Matty Healy and George Daniel with Jamie Squire, Benjamin Francis Leftwich and Jimmy Hogarth, the stripped-back piano song deals with fallibility and public failure, and directly addresses the controversy surrounding the band's 2019 music video for "People".

The song was never released as a single. On 4 November 2025, it was removed from all streaming platforms at Healy's request, reducing the digital edition of the album to ten tracks. The song has also been left off new vinyl pressings of the album, though earlier physical copies still include it.

== Background and recording ==
Being Funny in a Foreign Language followed the band's experimental fourth album Notes on a Conditional Form (2020) and marked a return to a more concise sound. The album was recorded at Real World Studios in Wiltshire and Electric Lady Studios in New York, with Jack Antonoff as co-producer. According to the album's tracklist, revealed in July 2022, "Human Too" was placed ninth of eleven songs, between "Wintering" and "About You".

Singer-songwriter Benjamin Francis Leftwich and producer Jimmy Hogarth share writing credits on the song alongside Squire. Leftwich had previously written "New York", a song Healy performed in 2021 and which developed into the album's lead single "Part of the Band".

== Composition ==
"Human Too" is a stripped-back piano song with a worn, lo-fi texture and gritty electronic production layered over it. NME's El Hunt described it as jazz-influenced. Its chorus relies on lyrical repetition, a device the Hillsdale Collegian noted it shares with "I'm in Love with You", though the two songs address very different struggles. Alyssa Crutcher of Hill Magazine found that its focus on fragility and weakness recalled the band's 2018 song "Be My Mistake".

Lyrically, the song has been interpreted as a meditation on being judged for one's mistakes, arguing that poor choices do not make a person bad, only human. According to Hunt, the song directly references the controversy over the "People" video, in which Healy detonated a fake suicide vest; in it, Healy apologises for the stunt while admitting that he enjoyed seeing himself in the news. The Hillsdale Collegian read the song as a plea to a friend, a partner or the narrator himself to accept imperfection.

== Release ==
"Human Too" was released as part of Being Funny in a Foreign Language on 14 October 2022.

=== Removal from streaming ===
On 4 November 2025, fans noticed that "Human Too" had been removed from streaming services, leaving the digital album at ten tracks. Responding to a fan on Reddit that afternoon, Healy said the song was removed "so the album is more how I want it to be", and confirmed that previous physical releases would remain the same. The song remained available on the band's YouTube channel. New pressings of the album on vinyl have since been issued without the song.

In the same reply, Healy said he doubted he would alter other records, with the possible exception of "What Should I Say" from Notes on a Conditional Form. When a fan asked him to leave that song alone, he agreed.

Coverage of the decision compared it to other cases of artists revising albums after release, such as Kanye West's changes to The Life of Pablo and Charli XCX's restyled Brat-era album covers. Billboard Brasil wrote that the change reopened debate over whether a released work can continue to be modified after reaching the public.

== Critical reception ==
James Mellen of Clash named "Human Too" a highlight of the album. Writing for The Lantern, critics called it one of the most vulnerable songs on the record, highlighting its piano and its treatment of cancel culture. Crutcher of Hill Magazine found that its chorus "pulls at the heartstrings of listeners".

Original track listing of Being Funny in a Foreign Language
No.	Title	Length
1	"The 1975"	4:10
2	"Happiness"	5:03
3	"Looking for Somebody (To Love)"	2:58
4	"Part of the Band"	4:20
5	"Oh Caroline"	3:32
6	"I'm in Love with You"	4:22
7	"All I Need to Hear"	3:30
8	"Wintering"	2:45
9	"Human Too"	3:44
10	"About You"	5:26
11	"When We Are Together"	3:36

== Personnel ==
Credits adapted from Dork.

- Matthew Healy – vocals, songwriting, production
- George Daniel – songwriting, production
- Jack Antonoff – production
- Jamie Squire – songwriting
- Benjamin Francis Leftwich – songwriting
- Jimmy Hogarth – songwriting

== See also ==
- The 1975 discography
- List of songs by Matty Healy
