= List of awards and nominations received by the 1975 =

The 1975 awards and nominations
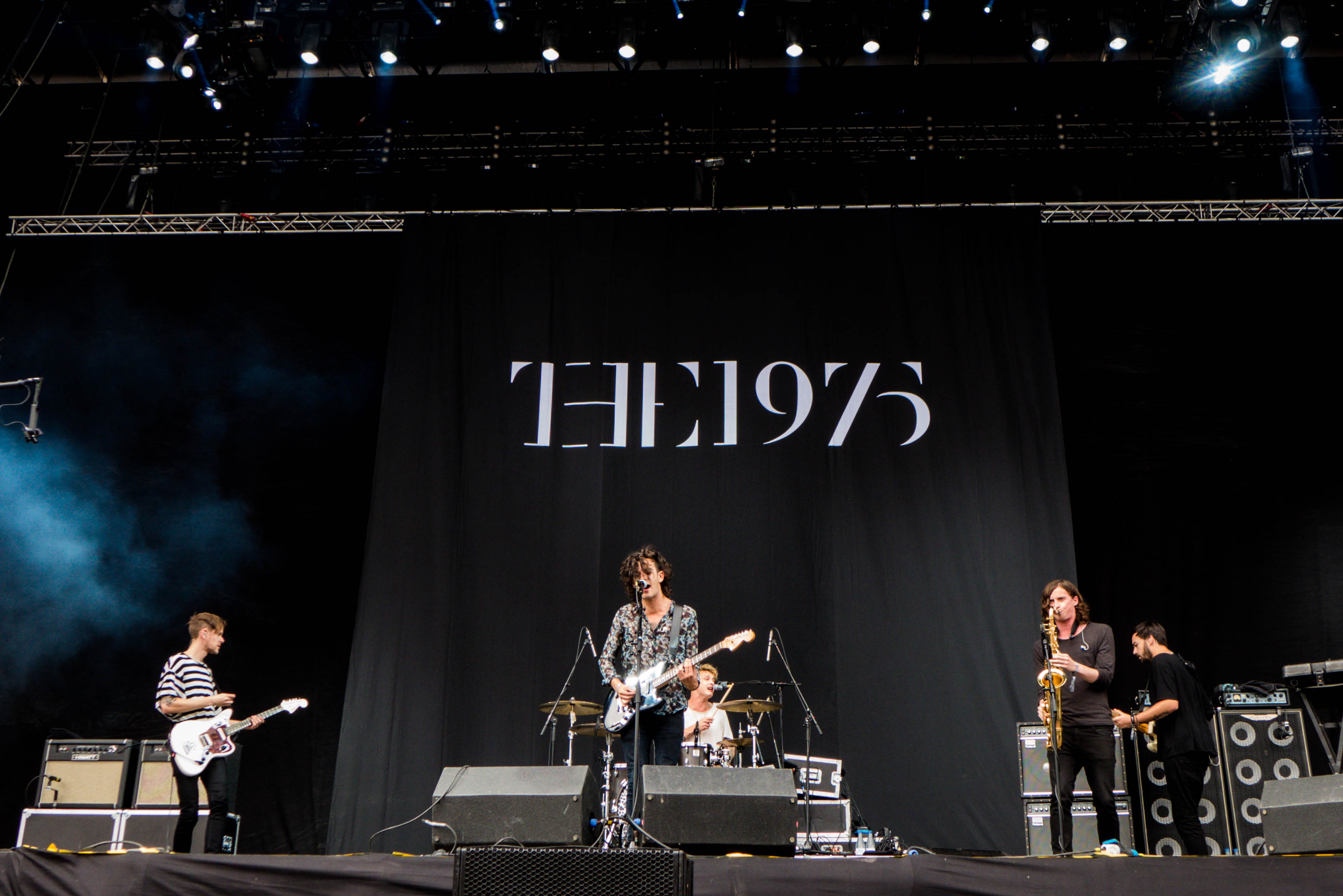
- The 1975 at Bilbao BBK Live 2014
Awards and nominations
Award	Wins	Nominations
AIM Independent Music Awards	0	1
BBC Music Awards	1	1
BBC Radio 1's Teen Awards	0	1
BRIT Awards	4	7
Grammy Awards	0	2
Hungarian Music Awards	0	1
Ivor Novello Awards	2	2
Mercury Prize	0	2
MTV Europe Music Awards	0	2
mtvU Woodie Awards	1	1
NME Awards	5	10
Pollstar Concert Industry Awards	0	1
Q Awards	2	12
Teen Choice Awards	0	1
UK Music Video Awards	0	1
UK Festival Awards	0	3

Totals (Note: Certain award groups do not simply award one winner. They acknowledge several different recipients, have runners-up, and have third place. Since this is a specific recognition and is different from losing an award, runner-up mentions are considered wins in this award tally. For simplification and to avoid errors, each award in this list has been presumed to have had a prior nomination.)
- Wins: 17
- Nominations: 47

The 1975 are an English pop rock band formed in 2002 in Wilmslow, Cheshire. Now based in Manchester, the band consists band consists of lead vocalist, principal songwriter, and rhythm guitarist Matty Healy, drummer and primary producer George Daniel, lead guitarist Adam Hann, and bassist Ross MacDonald. The name of the band was inspired by a page of scribblings found in Healy's copy of On the Road by Jack Kerouac that was dated "1 June, The 1975".

The band released four extended plays before releasing their self-titled studio album in 2013. They followed it with I Like It When You Sleep, for You Are So Beautiful yet So Unaware of It (2016), A Brief Inquiry into Online Relationships (2018), Notes on a Conditional Form (2020) and Being Funny in a Foreign Language (2022). Each of their studio albums topped the UK Albums Chart and garnered critical acclaim.

== AIM Awards ==
The AIM Independent Music Awards are hosted by the Association of Independent Music (AIM) and were established in 2011 to recognize artists signed to independent record labels in the United Kingdom.

Year	Nominee / work	Award	Result	Ref.
2013	The 1975	Independent Breakthrough of the Year	Nominated	

== BBC ==
=== BBC Music Awards ===
The BBC Music Awards are the BBC's annual pop music awards, held every December, as a celebration of the musical achievements over the past twelve months.

Year	Nominee / work	Award	Result	Ref.
2016	"What Makes You Beautiful' (One Direction cover)	Radio 1 Live Lounge Performance of the Year	Won	

=== BBC Radio 1's Hottest Record of the Year ===
Year	Nominee / work	Award	Result	Ref.
2018	"Give Yourself a Try"	Hottest Record of the Year	Second	
2022	"I'm in Love with You"	Hottest Record of the Year	Third	

=== BBC Radio 1's Teen Awards ===
The BBC Teen Awards is a music event exclusively for youngsters aged 14–17.

Year	Nominee / work	Award	Result	Ref.
2014	The 1975	Best British Group	Nominated	

== Brit Awards ==
The Brit Awards are the British Phonographic Industry's annual pop music awards.

Year	Nominee / work	Award	Result	Ref.
2017	The 1975	British Group	Won	
2017	I Like It When You Sleep, for You Are; So Beautiful yet So Unaware of It	British Album of the Year	Nominated	
2019	The 1975	British Group	Won	
2019	A Brief Inquiry into Online Relationships	British Album of the Year	Won	
2023	Being Funny in a Foreign Language	British Album of the Year	Nominated	
2023	The 1975	British Group	Nominated	
2023	The 1975	British Rock/Alternative Act	Won	

== GAFFA Awards ==
=== GAFFA Awards (Denmark) ===
Delivered since 1991, the GAFFA Awards are a Danish award that rewards popular music by the magazine of the same name.

Year	Nominee / work	Award	Result	Ref.
2019	The 1975	Best International Band	Nominated	
2019	A Brief Inquiry into Online Relationships	Best International Album	Nominated	

=== GAFFA Awards (Sweden) ===
Delivered since 2010, the GAFFA Awards (Swedish: GAFFA Priset) are a Swedish award that rewards popular music awarded by the magazine of the same name.

Year	Nominee / work	Award	Result	Ref.
2019	The 1975	Best Foreign Band	Nominated	

== Grammy Awards ==
The Grammy Awards are awarded annually by The Recording Academy of the United States for outstanding achievements in the music industry.

Year	Nominee / work	Award	Result	Ref.
2017	I Like It When You Sleep, for You Are; So Beautiful yet So Unaware of It	Grammy Award for Best Boxed or Special Limited Edition Package	Nominated	
2020	"Give Yourself A Try"	Grammy Award for Best Rock Song	Nominated	

Note: Only Samuel Burgess-Johnson & Matthew Healy were the art directors for the album cover and received the 2017 nomination. Jack Antonoff won a Grammy as Producer of the Year - including the song "Part of the Band“ by The 1975.

== GQ Men of the Year Awards ==
The GQ Men of the Year Awards are awarded annually by GQ in celebration of the men and women who shape the world's cultural landscape.

Year	Nominee / work	Award	Result	Ref.
2019	The 1975	Beats by Dr Dre Band	Won	

== Hungarian Music Awards ==
The Hungarian Music Awards have been given to artists in the field of Hungarian music since 1992. The award categories are similar to the Grammy Awards in the United States and the Brit Awards in the United Kingdom.

Year	Nominee / work	Award	Result	Ref.
2017	I Like It When You Sleep, for You Are; So Beautiful yet So Unaware of It	Alternative or indie rock album of the year or voice recording	Nominated	

== Ivor Novello Awards ==
The Ivor Novello Awards are awards for songwriting and composing; presented annually in London by the British Academy of Songwriters, Composers, and Authors (BASCA).

Year	Nominee / work	Award	Result	Ref.
2019	"Love It If We Made It"	Best Contemporary Song	Won	
2019	The 1975	Songwriter of the Year	Won	
2023	George Daniel and Matty Healy	Songwriter of the Year	Nominated	

== Knight of Illumination Awards ==
The Knight of Illumination Awards (KOI) began in 2007, celebrating video and light designers for their creative work in the UK.

Year	Nominee / work	Award	Result	Ref.
2016	The 1975	The Ayrton Award for Stage	Won	

The award was won by designer Tobias G. Rylander, who has worked alongside frontman Matty Healy on the band's stage set up.

== Mercury Prize ==
The Mercury Prize, formerly the Mercury Music Prize, is an annual music prize awarded for the best album from the United Kingdom or Ireland.

Year	Nominee / work	Award	Result	Ref.
2016	I Like It When You Sleep, for You Are; So Beautiful yet So Unaware of It	Album of the Year	Nominated	
2019	A Brief Inquiry into Online Relationships	Album of the Year	Nominated	

== MTV Awards ==
=== MTV Europe Music Awards ===
The MTV Europe Music Awards (commonly abbreviated as the EMAs) was established in 1994 by MTV Europe to award the music videos from European and international artists.

Year	Nominee / work	Award	Result	Ref.
2016	The 1975	Best Alternative	Nominated	
2018	The 1975	Best Alternative	Nominated	
2020	The 1975	Best Alternative	Nominated	
2020	"If You're Too Shy (Let Me Know)"	Best Alternative Video	Nominated	

=== MTV Video Music Awards ===
The MTV Video Music Awards (commonly abbreviated as the VMAs) was established in 1984 by MTV to award the music videos from the year.

Year	Nominee / work	Award	Result	Ref.
2019	"Love It If We Made It"	Best Rock	Nominated	
2020	"If You're Too Shy (Let Me Know)"	Best Alternative	Nominated	
2020	The 1975	Best Group	Nominated	

=== mtvU Woodie Awards ===
mtvU, a division of MTV Networks owned by Viacom, broadcasts a 24-hour television channel available on more than 750 college and university campuses across the United States.

Year	Nominee / work	Award	Result	Ref.
2014	The 1975	the breaking woodie	Won	

== NME ==
=== NME Awards ===
The NME Awards were created by the NME magazine and was first held in 1953.

Year	Nominee / work	Award	Result	Ref.
2014	The 1975	Worst Band	Won	
2015	The 1975	Worst Band	Nominated	
2016	The 1975	Best Fan Community	Nominated	
2016	The 1975	Best British Band	Nominated	
2017	The 1975	Best British Band	Nominated	
2017	The 1975	Best Live Band	Won	
2017	I Like It When You Sleep, for You Are; So Beautiful yet So Unaware of It	Best Album	Nominated	
2017	"Somebody Else"	Best Track	Nominated	
2018	The 1975	Best British Band	Nominated	
2018	The 1975	Best Festival Headliner	Nominated	
2020	The 1975	Best British Band	Won	
2020	The 1975	Band of the Decade	Won	
2020	The 1975	Innovation Award	Won	

== Pollstar Awards ==
Pollstar is a trade publication for the concert tour industry. It gets its information primarily from the agents, managers and promoters who produce concerts. Pollstar holds an annual award ceremony to honor artists and professionals in the concert industry.

Year	Nominee / work	Award	Result	Ref.
2017	The 1975	Best New Touring Artist	Nominated	

== Q Awards ==
The Q Awards are the United Kingdom's annual music awards run by the music magazine Q to honour musical excellence. Winners are voted by readers of Q online, with others decided by a judging panel.

Year	Nominee / work	Award	Result	Ref.
2014	The 1975	Best New Act	Nominated	
2016	The 1975	Best Act in the World Today	Nominated	
2016	I Like It When You Sleep, for You Are; So Beautiful yet So Unaware of It	Best Album	Won	
2016	"Somebody Else"	Best Track	Nominated	
2016	"A Change of Heart"	Best Video	Nominated	
2017	The 1975	Best Act in the World Today	Nominated	
2018	The 1975	Best Act in the World Today	Nominated	
2018	"Love It If We Made It"	Best Track	Nominated	
2019	"People"	Best Track	Nominated	
2019	A Brief Inquiry into Online Relationships	Best Album	Nominated	
2019	The 1975 - Reading Festival	Best Live Performance	Nominated	
2019	The 1975	Best Act in the World Today	Won	

== Teen Choice Awards ==
The Teen Choice Awards is an annual awards show that airs on the Fox Network. The awards honour the year's biggest achievements in music, films, sports, television, fashion and other categories, voted by teenage viewers.

Year	Nominee / work	Award	Result	Ref.
2016	The 1975	Choice Summer Music Star: Group	Nominated	

== UK Music Video Awards ==
The UK Music Video Awards is an annual award ceremony founded in 2008 to recognise creativity, technical excellence and innovation in music videos and moving images for music.

Year	Nominee / work	Award	Result	Ref.
2016	"A Change of Heart"	Best Pop Video - UK	Nominated	
2019	"Sincerity Is Scary"	Best Pop Video - UK	Nominated	
2019	"Love It If We Made It"	Best Rock Video - UK	Nominated	
2022	"Part of the Band"	Best Pop Video - UK	Nominated	

== UK Festival Awards ==
The UK Festival Awards are awarded annually, with various categories for all aspects of festivals that have taken place in the UK, and one category for European festivals.

Year	Nominee / work	Award	Result	Ref.
2013	The 1975	Best Breakthrough Act	Nominated	
2014	The 1975	Best Breakthrough Act	Nominated	
2014	"Chocolate"	Anthem Of The Summer	Nominated	

== Žebřík Music Awards ==
Year	Nominee / work	Award	Result	Ref.
2013	The 1975	Best International Discovery	Nominated	
