= The 1975 discography =

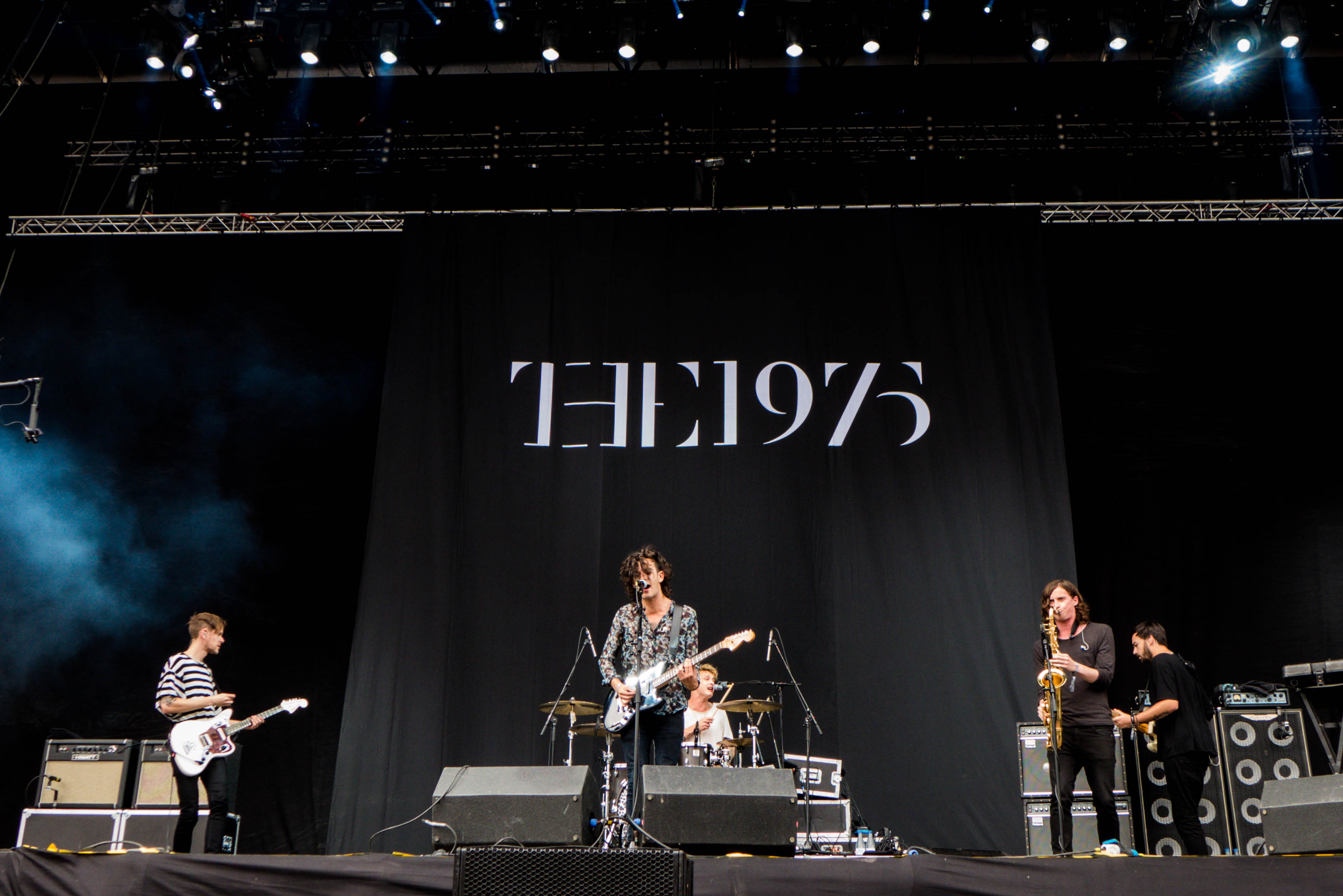
- The 1975 performing live in 2014.
- Studio albums: 5
- EPs: 5
- Live albums: 5
- Singles: 34
- Music videos: 35

English pop band the 1975 have released five studio albums, five live albums, five extended plays, 35 music videos and 34 singles. The band consists of lead vocalist, principal songwriter, and rhythm guitarist Matty Healy, drummer and primary producer George Daniel, lead guitarist Adam Hann, and bassist Ross MacDonald.

The band's eponymous debut album, The 1975 (2013), debuted at number one on the UK Albums Chart and was certified Platinum by the British Phonographic Industry. Its follow-up, I Like It When You Sleep, for You Are So Beautiful yet So Unaware of It, was released on 26 February 2016 and became their second successive chart topper.

Subsequent albums A Brief Inquiry into Online Relationships (2018) and Notes on a Conditional Form (2020) both reached number one as well. The band's fifth album, Being Funny in a Foreign Language, followed on 14 October 2022.

== Albums ==
=== Studio albums ===
List of albums, with selected chart positions
Title	Album details	Peak chart positions										Sales	Certifications
Title	Album details	UK	AUS	AUT	CAN	GER	IRE	NZ	SCO	SWI	US	Sales	Certifications
The 1975	Released: 2 September 2013; Label: Dirty Hit, Polydor (DH00040); Formats: CD, LP, cassette, digital download	1	29	60	17	57	4	5	1	100	28	UK: 900,000; US: 1,000,000	BPI: 3× Platinum; ARIA: Gold; RIAA: Platinum; RMNZ: Platinum
I Like It When You Sleep, for You Are So Beautiful Yet So Unaware of It	Released: 26 February 2016; Label: Dirty Hit, Interscope (DH00117); Formats: CD, LP, cassette, digital download, streaming	1	1	10	1	28	3	1	1	19	1	UK: 312,645; US: 98,000	BPI: Platinum; RIAA: Gold; RMNZ: Platinum
A Brief Inquiry into Online Relationships	Released: 30 November 2018; Label: Dirty Hit, Interscope (DH00442); Formats: CD, LP, cassette, digital download, streaming	1	4	61	15	57	4	9	1	89	4	UK: 138,397; US: 66,000	BPI: Platinum
Notes on a Conditional Form	Released: 22 May 2020; Label: Dirty Hit, Interscope; Formats: CD, LP, cassette, digital download, streaming	1	1	30	19	36	2	4	1	36	4	US: 39,000	BPI: Gold
Being Funny in a Foreign Language	Released: 14 October 2022; Label: Dirty Hit, Interscope; Formats: CD, LP, cassette, digital download, streaming	1	1	25	10	53	1	4	1	16	7	US: 19,500	BPI: Gold; RMNZ: Gold

=== Live albums ===
List of live albums, with selected details
Title	Details	Peak chart positions				
Title	Details	UK	IRE	SCO	US Sales	US Class.
DH00278	Released: 15 December 2017; Label: Dirty Hit/Interscope (DH00278); Format: DL	— (Note: DH00278 did not enter the UK Albums Chart, but peaked at number 91 on the UK Album Downloads Chart.)	—	—	—	—
Live with the BBC Philharmonic Orchestra	Released: 22 April 2023; Label: Dirty Hit; Format: CD, LP, cassette	2	49	2	46	1
At Their Very Best	Released: 6 January 2023; Label: Dirty Hit; Format: LP, streaming	—	—	—	—	—
Live at Gorilla	Released: 1 September 2023; Label: Dirty Hit; Format: LP, streaming	—	—	—	—	—
Still... At Their Very Best (Live from the AO Arena, Manchester, 17.02.24)	Released: 7 March 2025; Label: Dirty Hit; Format: LP, streaming	55	—	7	—	—
"—" denotes a recording that did not chart or was not released in that territory.

== Extended plays ==
Title	Details	Peak chart positions		
Title	Details	US	US Rock	US Heat.
Facedown	Released: 6 August 2012; Label: Dirty Hit; Formats: DL, 12" vinyl	—	—	—
Sex	Released: 19 November 2012; Label: Dirty Hit; Formats: DL, 12" vinyl	—	—	—
iTunes Festival: London 2013	Released: 1 January 2013; Label: Interscope; Formats: DL	—	—	—
Music for Cars	Released: 4 March 2013; Label: Dirty Hit; Formats: DL, 12" vinyl	—	—	44
IV	Released: 20 May 2013; Label: Dirty Hit, Polydor; Formats: DL, 12" vinyl	164	42	2
Spotify Sessions	Released: 18 June 2013; Label: Dirty Hit, Polydor; Formats: Streaming	—	—	—
Rdio Sessions	Released: 2014; Label: Dirty Hit, Polydor; Formats: Streaming	—	—	—
"—" denotes a recording that did not chart or was not released in that territory.

== Singles ==
=== As lead artist ===
Single	Year	Peak chart positions										Certifications	Album
Single	Year	UK	AUS	CAN	CZR	IRE	JPN	NZ	SCO	US	US Rock	Certifications	Album
"The City"	2012	30	—	—	—	—	—	—	27	—	—	BPI: Gold	The 1975
"Chocolate"	2013	19	—	99	—	9	29	—	18	80	13	BPI: 3× Platinum; RIAA: 2× Platinum; RMNZ: Platinum	The 1975
"Sex"	2013	34	—	—	—	—	—	—	24	—	— (Note: "Sex" did not enter the US Hot Rock & Alternative Songs chart, but peaked at number 35 on the US Alternative Airplay chart.)	BPI: Platinum; RIAA: Gold; RMNZ: Gold	The 1975
"Girls"	2013	45	— (Note: "Girls" did not enter the Australian ARIA Singles Chart but peaked at number 11 on the ARIA Hitseekers Chart.)	—	62	88	—	—	42	— (Note: "Girls" did not enter the Billboard Hot 100, but peaked at number 19 on the Bubbling Under Hot 100 Singles chart.)	12	BPI: Platinum; RIAA: Platinum; RMNZ: Gold	The 1975
"Settle Down"	2014	68	—	—	—	—	—	—	59	—	—	BPI: Silver	The 1975
"Robbers"	2014	166	—	—	—	—	—	—	—	—	—	BPI: Platinum; RIAA: Platinum; RMNZ: Platinum	The 1975
"Heart Out"	2014	—	—	—	—	—	—	—	—	—	—	BPI: Silver	The 1975
"Medicine"	2014	53	— (Note: "Medicine" did not enter the Australian ARIA Singles Chart but peaked at number four on the ARIA Hitseekers Chart.)	—	75	74	—	—	33	—	35		Non-album single
"Love Me"	2015	20	35	— (Note: "Love Me" did not enter the Billboard Canadian Hot 100, but peaked at number 39 on the Canadian Digital Song Sales chart.)	—	40	—	— (Note: "Love Me" did not enter the New Zealand singles chart, but peaked at number six on the New Zealand Heatseekers chart.)	10	100	7	BPI: Gold; RIAA: Gold	I Like It When You Sleep, for You Are; So Beautiful Yet So Unaware of It
"Ugh!"	2015	42	113	—	—	80	—	—	26	—	10	BPI: Silver	I Like It When You Sleep, for You Are; So Beautiful Yet So Unaware of It
"Somebody Else"	2016	55	34	—	—	70	—	—	29	— (Note: "Somebody Else" did not enter the Billboard Hot 100, but peaked at number 20 on the Bubbling Under Hot 100 Singles chart.)	8	BPI: 2x Platinum; ARIA: Gold; RIAA: 2× Platinum; RMNZ: 2× Platinum	I Like It When You Sleep, for You Are; So Beautiful Yet So Unaware of It
"The Sound"	2016	15	53	91	73	25	42	— (Note: "The Sound" did not enter the New Zealand singles chart, but peaked at number six on the New Zealand Heatseekers chart.)	11	— (Note: "The Sound" did not enter the Billboard Hot 100, but peaked at number 3 on the Bubbling Under Hot 100 Singles chart.)	9	BPI: 2× Platinum; ARIA: Gold; RIAA: Platinum; RMNZ: Platinum	I Like It When You Sleep, for You Are; So Beautiful Yet So Unaware of It
"A Change of Heart"	2016	127	—	—	—	—	—	—	—	—	47	BPI: Silver	I Like It When You Sleep, for You Are; So Beautiful Yet So Unaware of It
"She's American"	2016	150	—	—	—	—	—	—	91	—	32	BPI: Silver	I Like It When You Sleep, for You Are; So Beautiful Yet So Unaware of It
"Loving Someone"	2017	—	—	—	—	—	—	—	—	—	—	BPI: Silver	I Like It When You Sleep, for You Are; So Beautiful Yet So Unaware of It
"By Your Side"	2017	— (Note: "By Your Side" did not enter the UK Singles Chart, but peaked at number 51 on the UK Singles Sales Chart.)	—	—	—	—	—	—	50	—	32		Non-album single
"Milk"	2017	—	—	—	—	—	—	—	—	—	—		Sex
"Give Yourself a Try"	2018	22	94	—	—	51	—	— (Note: "Give Yourself a Try" did not enter the New Zealand singles chart, but peaked at number three on the New Zealand Heatseekers chart.)	27	—	12	BPI: Gold	A Brief Inquiry into Online Relationships
"Love It If We Made It"	2018	33	—	—	—	35	—	— (Note: "Love It If We Made It" did not enter the New Zealand singles chart, but peaked at number 12 on the New Zealand Hot Singles chart.)	47	—	10	BPI: Platinum; RIAA: Gold; RMNZ: Gold	A Brief Inquiry into Online Relationships
"TooTimeTooTimeTooTime"	2018	26	—	—	—	29	— (Note: "TooTimeTooTimeTooTime" did not enter the Billboard Japan Hot 100 chart, but peaked at number 12 on the Billboard Japan Hot Overseas Songs chart.)	— (Note: "TooTimeTooTimeTooTime" did not enter the New Zealand singles chart, but peaked at number 15 on the New Zealand Hot Singles chart.)	29	—	17	BPI: Platinum	A Brief Inquiry into Online Relationships
"Sincerity Is Scary"	2018	57	—	—	—	66	—	— (Note: "Sincerity Is Scary" did not enter the New Zealand singles chart, but peaked at number 34 on the New Zealand Hot Singles chart.)	84	—	20	BPI: Silver	A Brief Inquiry into Online Relationships
"It's Not Living (If It's Not with You)"	2018	46	—	—	—	48	—	— (Note: "It's Not Living (If It's Not with You)" did not enter the New Zealand singles chart, but peaked at number 27 on the New Zealand Hot Singles chart.)	36	—	19	BPI: Platinum; RIAA: Gold; RMNZ: Gold	A Brief Inquiry into Online Relationships
"People"	2019	54	—	—	—	68	—	— (Note: "People" did not enter the New Zealand singles chart, but peaked at number 36 on the New Zealand Hot Singles chart.)	59	—	15		Notes on a Conditional Form
"Frail State of Mind"	2019	54	—	—	—	69	— (Note: "Frail State of Mind" did not enter the Billboard Japan Hot 100 chart, but peaked at number 15 on the Billboard Japan Hot Overseas Songs chart.)	— (Note: "Frail State of Mind" did not enter the New Zealand singles chart, but peaked at number 28 on the New Zealand Hot Singles chart.)	—	—	17		Notes on a Conditional Form
"Me & You Together Song"	2020	35	—	—	—	46	—	— (Note: "Me & You Together Song" did not enter the New Zealand singles chart, but peaked at number 21 on the New Zealand Hot Singles chart.)	30	—	5	BPI: Silver	Notes on a Conditional Form
"The Birthday Party"	2020	69	—	—	—	86	—	— (Note: "The Birthday Party" did not enter the New Zealand singles chart, but peaked at number 27 on the New Zealand Hot Singles chart.)	—	—	23		Notes on a Conditional Form
"Jesus Christ 2005 God Bless America"	2020	88	—	—	—	83	—	— (Note: "Jesus Christ 2005 God Bless America" did not enter the New Zealand singles chart, but peaked at number 11 on the New Zealand Hot Singles chart.)	—	—	38		Notes on a Conditional Form
"If You're Too Shy (Let Me Know)"	2020	14	85	—	—	13	—	— (Note: "If You're Too Shy (Let Me Know)" did not enter the New Zealand singles chart, but peaked at number four on the New Zealand Hot Singles chart.)	18	—	5	BPI: Platinum; RMNZ: Gold	Notes on a Conditional Form
"Guys"	2020	96	—	—	—	—	—	— (Note: "Guys" did not enter the New Zealand singles chart, but peaked at number 40 on the New Zealand Hot Singles chart.)	85	—	17		Notes on a Conditional Form
"Spinning" (with No Rome and Charli XCX)	2021	94	—	—	—	81	— (Note: "Spinning" did not enter the Billboard Japan Hot 100 chart, but peaked at number 11 on the Billboard Japan Hot Overseas Songs chart.)	— (Note: "Spinning" did not enter the New Zealand singles chart, but peaked at number 38 on the New Zealand Hot Singles chart.)	×	—	40		Non-album single
"Part of the Band"	2022	57	—	—	—	70	— (Note: "Part of the Band" did not enter the Billboard Japan Hot 100 chart, but peaked at number six on the Billboard Japan Hot Overseas Songs chart.)	— (Note: "Part of the Band" did not enter the NZ Top 40 Singles Chart, but peaked at number 14 on the NZ Hot Singles Chart.)	×	—	29		Being Funny in a Foreign Language
"Happiness"	2022	46	—	—	—	65	— (Note: "Happiness" did not enter the Billboard Japan Hot 100 chart, but peaked at number four on the Billboard Japan Hot Overseas Songs chart.)	— (Note: "Happiness" did not enter the NZ Top 40 Singles Chart, but peaked at number 29 on the NZ Hot Singles Chart.)	×	—	20	BPI: Silver	Being Funny in a Foreign Language
"I'm in Love with You"	2022	29	—	—	—	57	— (Note: "I'm in Love with You" did not enter the Billboard Japan Hot 100 chart, but peaked at number five on the Billboard Japan Hot Overseas Songs chart.)	— (Note: "I'm in Love with You" did not enter the NZ Top 40 Singles Chart, but peaked at number four on the NZ Hot Singles Chart.)	×	— (Note: "I'm in Love with You" did not enter the Billboard Hot 100, but peaked at number 32 on the Digital Song Sales chart.)	27	BPI: Gold	Being Funny in a Foreign Language
"All I Need to Hear"	2022	— (Note: "All I Need to Hear" did not enter the UK Singles Chart, but peaked at number 10 on the UK Singles Sales Chart.)	—	—	—	—	— (Note: "All I Need to Hear" did not enter the Billboard Japan Hot 100 chart, but peaked at number 12 on the Billboard Japan Hot Overseas Songs chart.)	— (Note: "All I Need to Hear" did not enter the NZ Top 40 Singles Chart, but peaked at number 21 on the NZ Hot Singles Chart.)	×	—	—		Being Funny in a Foreign Language
"About You"	2022	41	—	—	—	41	—	— (Note: "About You" did not enter the NZ Top 40 Singles Chart, but peaked at number 8 on the NZ Hot Singles Chart.)	×	—	29	BPI: Platinum; RIAA: Gold; RMNZ: Platinum	Being Funny in a Foreign Language
"Oh Caroline"	2023	29	—	—	—	41	—	— (Note: "Oh Caroline" did not enter the NZ Top 40 Singles Chart, but peaked at number four on the NZ Hot Singles Chart.)	×	—	30	BPI: Silver	Being Funny in a Foreign Language
"Looking for Somebody (To Love)"	2023	— (Note: "Looking for Somebody (To Love)" did not enter the UK Singles Chart, but peaked at number 95 on the UK Streaming Chart.)	—	—	—	—	—	— (Note: "Looking for Somebody (To Love)" did not enter the NZ Top 40 Singles Chart, but peaked at number 10 on the NZ Hot Singles Chart.)	×	—	—		Being Funny in a Foreign Language
"Now Is the Hour"	2024	—	—	—	—	—	—	—	—	—	—		The New Look (Apple TV+ Original Series Soundtrack)
"—" denotes a recording that did not chart or was not released in that territory. "×" denotes periods where charts did not exist or were not archived.

=== As featured artist ===
Single	Year	Peak chart positions	Album
Single	Year	US R&B/Hip-Hop	Album
"Don't Play" (Travis Scott featuring The 1975 and Big Sean)	2014	38	Days Before Rodeo
"Narcissist" (No Rome featuring The 1975)	2018	—	RIP Indo Hisashi
"—" denotes a recording that did not chart or was not released in that territory.

=== Remixes ===
Song	Year	Original artist(s)
"Head.Cars.Bending" (The 1975 Remix)	2012	The 1975
"The Mess" (The 1975 Remix)	2013	The Naked and Famous
"Cavalier" (The 1975 Remix)	2014	James Vincent McMorrow
"Drive" (The 1975 Remix)	2014	Travis Scott

== Other charted and certified songs ==
List of songs, with selected chart positions and certifications, showing year released and album name
Song	Year	Peak chart positions						Certifications	Album
Song	Year	UK	UK Indie	IRE	NZ Hot	US Dance	US Rock	Certifications	Album
"Facedown"	2012	— (Note: "Facedown" did not enter the UK Singles Chart, but peaked at number four on the UK Physical Singles Chart.)	50	—	—	—		Facedown	
"Intro/Set3"	2012	—	17	—	—	—	—		Sex
"Fallingforyou"	2013	—	—	—	—	—	—	BPI: Silver; RIAA: Gold; RMNZ: Gold	IV
"She Way Out"	2013	—	—	—	—	—	—	BPI: Silver	The 1975
"Menswear"	2013	—	—	—	—	—	—	BPI: Silver	The 1975
"If I Believe You"	2016	—	—	—	—	—	49		I Like It When You Sleep, for You Are So Beautiful Yet So Unaware of It
"Paris"	2016	— (Note: "Paris" did not enter the UK Singles Chart, but peaked at number 14 on the UK Physical Singles Chart.)	—	—	—	—	BPI: Silver		I Like It When You Sleep, for You Are So Beautiful Yet So Unaware of It
"Be My Mistake"	2018	—	—	—	24	—	36	BPI: Silver	A Brief Inquiry into Online Relationships
"I Like America & America Likes Me"	2018	—	—	—	29	—	44		A Brief Inquiry into Online Relationships
"I Always Wanna Die (Sometimes)"	2018	67	—	70	16	—	31	BPI: Silver	A Brief Inquiry into Online Relationships
"102"	2018	— (Note: "102" did not enter the UK Singles Chart, but peaked at number 33 on the UK Singles Sales Chart.)	—	—	—	—	—		A Brief Inquiry into Online Relationships
"Roadkill"	2020	—	—	—	36	—	—		Notes on a Conditional Form
"I Think There's Something You Should Know"	2020	—	—	—	—	—	40		Notes on a Conditional Form
"Nothing Revealed / Everything Denied"	2020	82	—	—	28	—	—		Notes on a Conditional Form
"Tonight (I Wish I Was Your Boy)"	2020	56	—	67	15	—	11		Notes on a Conditional Form
"Playing on My Mind"	2020	—	—	—	33	—	—		Notes on a Conditional Form
"The 1975"	2022	—	14	—	14	—	—		Being Funny in a Foreign Language
"Wintering"	2022	—	20	—	—	—	—		Being Funny in a Foreign Language
"Human Too"	2022	—	35	—	—	—	—		Being Funny in a Foreign Language
"When We Are Together"	2022	—	32	—	—	—	—		Being Funny in a Foreign Language
"I Might Say Something Stupid" (Charli XCX featuring the 1975 and Jon Hopkins)	2024	—	—	—	—	13	—		Brat and It's Completely Different but Also Still Brat
"—" denotes a recording that did not chart or was not released in that territory.

== Music videos ==
Title	Year	Director(s)
"Facedown"	2012	James Booth
"The City"	2012	James Booth
"Antichrist"	2012	James Booth
"Woman"	2012	James Booth
"Sex" (EP version)	2012	James Booth
"Chocolate"	2013	Gareth Phillips
"The City" (version 2)	2013	Tim Mattia
"Sex" (album version)	2013	Adam Powell
"Sex" (acoustic version)	2013	N/A
"Girls"	2013	Adam Powell
"Settle Down"	2014	Nadia Otaen
"Robbers"	2014	Tim Mattia
"Heart Out"	2014	Matty Healy, Adam Powell
"Love Me"	2015	Diane Martel
"Ugh!"	2015	Adam Powell
"The Sound"	2016	Tim Mattia
"A Change of Heart"	2016	Tim Mattia
"Somebody Else"	2016	Tim Mattia
"Give Yourself a Try"	2018	Diane Martel
"Love It If We Made It" (vertical video version)	2018	Adam Powell
"TooTimeTooTimeTooTime"	2018	N/A
"Love It If We Made It"	2018	Adam Powell
"Sincerity Is Scary"	2018	Warren Fu
"It's Not Living (If It's Not with You)"	2018	Warren Fu
"People"	2019	Ben Ditto, Matty Healy & Warren Fu
"Frail State of Mind"	2019	Matty Healy, Patricia Villirillo & Mara Palena
"Me & You Together Song"	2020	bedroom
"The Birthday Party"	2020	Ben Ditto & Jon Emmony
"If You're Too Shy (Let Me Know)"	2020	Adam Powell
"Guys"	2020	N/A
"Spinning" (with No Rome & Charli XCX)	2021	Karlos Velásquez
"Part of the Band"	2022	Samuel Bradley
"Happiness"	2022	Samuel Bradley
"I'm in Love with You"	2022	Samuel Bradley
"All I Need to Hear"	2022	Samuel Bradley
"Oh Caroline"	2022	Samuel Bradley

== See also ==
- Songs by Matty Healy
