= About You (The 1975 song) =

Single by The 1975

from the album Being Funny in a Foreign Language
- Released: 8 December 2022
- Genre: Pop rock; dream pop
- Length: 5:26
- Label: Dirty Hit; Polydor Records
- Songwriters: Matthew Healy; George Daniel
- Producers: Matthew Healy; George Daniel; Jack Antonoff

The 1975 singles chronology
"All I Need to Hear" (2022)	"About You" (2022)	"Oh Caroline" (2023)

"About You" is a song by English band The 1975 from their fifth studio album, Being Funny in a Foreign Language (2022). The song was released on 8 December 2022 through Dirty Hit and Polydor Records as the fifth single from the album. It was written by band members Matty Healy and George Daniel, who also produced the song alongside Jack Antonoff. The song features additional vocals by Carly Holt, who is married to the band's lead guitarist Adam Hann, and string arrangements from musician and composer Warren Ellis of Nick Cave and the Bad Seeds.

Musically, "About You" is a pop rock ballad featuring shoegaze-inspired production; Healy cited U2, Phil Spector and David Cronenberg as influences for the track. The single, after its release, would hit number 41 on both the UK singles chart and the Irish Singles Chart. The song also peaked at number 8 on the NZ Hot Singles Chart, number 37 on the Philippines Hot 100, number 18 on the Official Indonesia Chart, and number 29 on the Billboard Hot Rock & Alternative Songs chart in the United States. The song was also certified gold by the British Phonographic Industry (BPI), the Recording Industry Association of America (RIAA), and Recorded Music NZ (RMNZ).

== Background and development ==
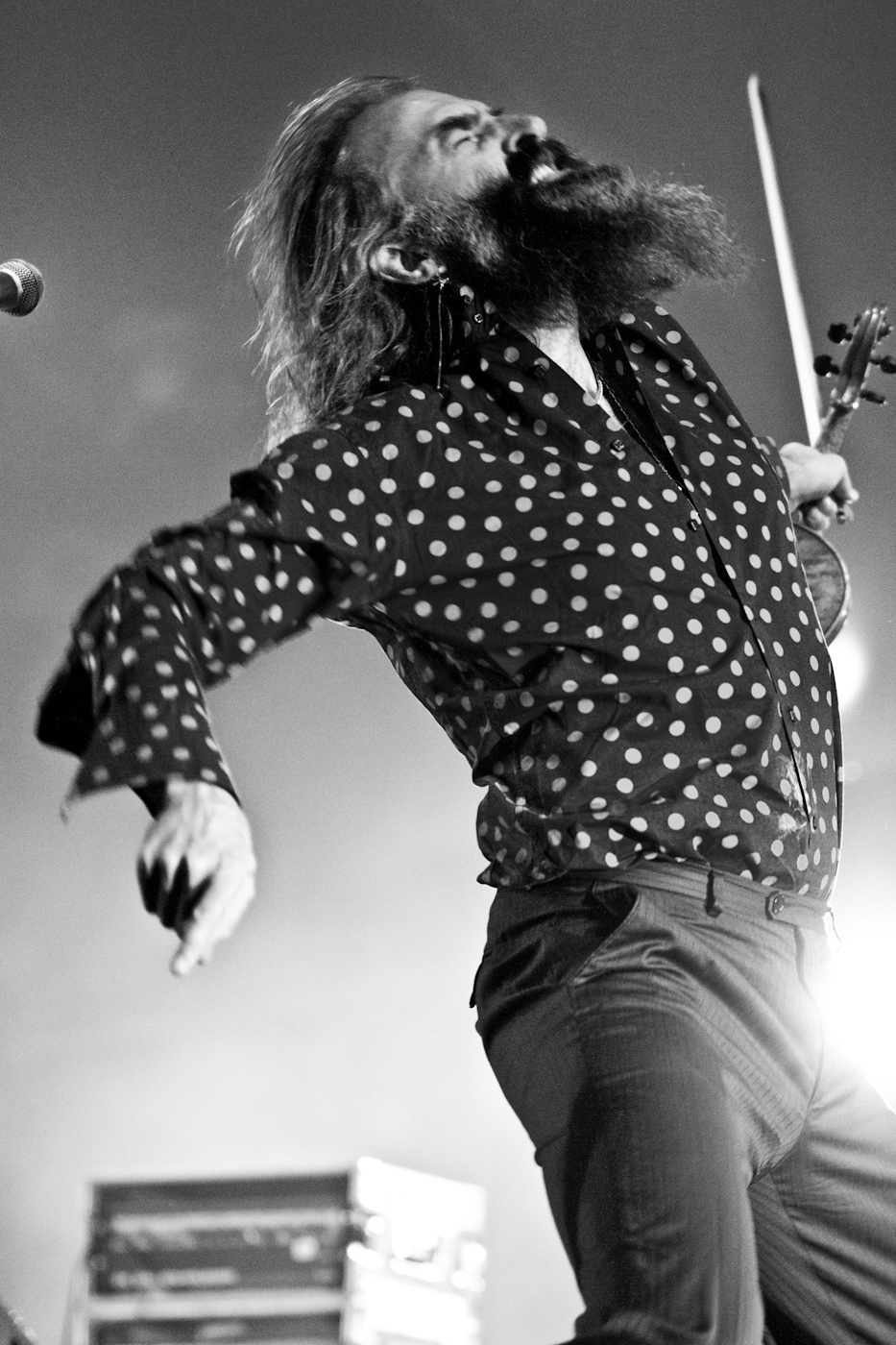
Warren Ellis (pictured) of Dirty Three and Nick Cave and the Bad Seeds performed on the track.

Healy envisioned "About You" as a musical continuation of the band's 2013 hit single "Robbers". He credited musician and composer Warren Ellis – who contributed string arrangements to the album – with having a significant influence on the track's creative direction. He noted that the initial version of the track was "really simple" and "stylistically a little bit cleaner" than "Robbers", before Ellis "made it all weird and shoegazey". Healy felt Ellis' work on the track was characterized by the "moving, weird distortion" present throughout the arrangement, which he felt lent the song a "gothic feeling". He elaborated: "Even though it’s in major key [sic], [Ellis] gave it this terror, which makes my performance in it a lot less romantic because everything is mushing together, and it’s violent." He elaborated: "I’ve always loved those kinds of Cronenberg, body-horror analogies, the tension between death and sex. I think that the morose can be quite sensual, and there’s quite a bit of that in my work."

Healy cited Phil Spector as an influence on the band's initial decision to fill the track with "this huge hall reverb ... rather than being able to feel the rhythm", drawing inspiration from Spector's production on The Ronettes' "Be My Baby". He also noted the song's similarities with U2's "With or Without You", and likened the final version of the song to the track "Inside Your Mind" from the band's third album, A Brief Inquiry Into Online Relationships (2018).

== Music and lyrics ==
Musically, "About You" is a pop rock song in the key of D major, and has a tempo of 96 beats per minute. The song's shoegaze-inspired production is characterized by "swooping strings, fuzzed-out guitars, and drowsy saxophones", which Maura Johnston of Rolling Stone felt "[shroud]" Healy's voice in the "chaos" of the instrumentation. Healy sings in a lower register throughout the track, which Johnston likened to the voice of George Michael. In April 2024, Taylor Swift released a song presumably about the relationship between her and Matty Healy titled Guilty as Sin? which fans had interpolated as inspiration from ”About You”.

== Critical reception ==
In 2023, the staff of Paste Magazine ranked "About You" as the thirteenth best song by The 1975. Compared to the band's typical sound, Miranda Wollen noted that the "drama of the song’s instrumentation and the depth of its lyricism" were more minimalistic. In comparison to its musical predecessor, "Robbers", Wollen stated that "About You" sounded more mature: "The 1975 no longer need to throw a million sounds at you per minute; they’ve perfected their sound enough that a softer, more emotional piece can carry the same immovable force as their early maximalism. Add in that stunning refrain from Carly Holt, guitarist Adam Hann’s wife, and it’s a perfectly duetic portrayal of a tangent-lined love."

== Credits and personnel ==
Adapted from Tidal.

- George Daniel – drums, programming, production, songwriting
- Adam Hann – guitar
- Matthew Healy – vocals, guitar, production, songwriting
- Ross MacDonald – bass
- Jack Antonoff – production
- Mr Hudson – production
- Manny Marroquin – mixing
- Chris Galland – mixing
- Robin Schmidt – mastering
- Andrew Gearheart – engineering
- Dave Gross – engineering
- Evan Smith – engineering
- Jon Gautier – engineering
- Laura Sisk – engineering
- Oli Jacobs – engineering
- Jeremie Inhaber – mixing assistance
- Robin Florent – mixing assistance
- Scott Desmarais – mixing assistance
- Dani Prez Carasols – engineering assistance
- Dom Shaw – engineering assistance
- Freddy Williams – engineering assistance
- John Rooney – engineering assistance
- Katie May – engineering assistance
- Liam Hebb – engineering assistance

== Charts ==
=== Weekly charts ===
Weekly chart performance for "About You"
Chart (2022–2026)	Peak position
Indonesia (IFPI)	10
Ireland (IRMA)	41
New Zealand Hot Singles (RMNZ)	8
Philippines (IFPI)	15
Philippines Hot 100 (Billboard)	13
UK Singles (Official Charts)	41
US Hot Rock & Alternative Songs (Billboard)	29
US Rock & Alternative Airplay (Billboard)	17

=== Year-end charts ===
Year-end chart performance for "About You"
Chart (2025)	Position
Philippines (Philippines Hot 100)	41

== Certifications ==
Certifications and sales for "About You"
Region	Certification	Certified units/sales
United Kingdom (BPI)	Platinum	600,000^{‡}
United States (RIAA)	Gold	500,000^{‡}
^{‡} Sales+streaming figures based on certification alone.

== Yoste version ==
Australian singer-songwriter Yoste released a cover of the song in 2023, featuring Evangeline on backing vocals.

== See also ==
- The 1975 discography
- List of songs by Matty Healy
