= All I Need to Hear =

Single by the 1975

from the album Being Funny in a Foreign Language
- Released: 21 September 2022
- Genre: Blue-eyed soul
- Length: 3:30
- Label: Dirty Hit; Polydor Records
- Songwriters: Matthew Healy; George Daniel; Jamie Squire
- Producers: Matthew Healy; George Daniel; Jack Antonoff

The 1975 singles chronology
"I'm in Love with You" (2022)	"All I Need to Hear" (2022)	"About You" (2022)

Music video
- "All I Need to Hear" on YouTube

"All I Need to Hear" is a song by English band the 1975 from their fifth studio album, Being Funny in a Foreign Language (2022). The song was released on 21 September 2022 through Dirty Hit and Polydor Records as the fourth single from the album. It was written by band members Matty Healy and George Daniel alongside Jamie Squire. Production of the song was handled by Healy, Daniel and Jack Antonoff. Inspired by Paul Simon's "Still Crazy After All These Years" (1976), Healy sought to replicate Simon's sincerity and earnestness by crafting a songwriting exercise where the singer deliberately omitted sardonic and humorous lyrics, aiming to make the song sound akin to a cover.

A downtempo slow jam, "All I Need to Hear" is composed in the style of a blue-eyed soul piano ballad. Drawing influence from country soul, blues, country, jazz, roots and soul music, the song's melancholic, stripped-down production uses a sombre gospel piano, acoustic guitars, a sleepy drum beat, poignant strings and flickers of pedal steel guitar. Thematically, it is a love song that explores themes of heartbreak and isolation following the end of a relationship. Lyrically, the song focuses on Healy's all-consuming love for a former partner and discusses his desire for reciprocal love, rather than material possessions and other relationships.

"All I Need to Hear" received positive reviews from contemporary music critics, who praised song's understated, simplistic tone and the emotional vulnerability in the lyrics, with several deeming it a career highlight. Reviewers compared the song to the Rolling Stones and Billy Joel. Commercially, the song reached number 36 on the UK Indie Chart, number 21 on the New Zealand Hot Singles chart and number 12 on the Billboard Japan Japan Hot Overseas chart. An accompanying music video, directed by Samuel Bradley, was released on 21 September. The black-and-white visual, shot in a documentary style, features Healy engaging in a monologue while wandering the gardens of Peter Gabriel's Real World Studios in Box, Wiltshire, England, before joining the remaining the 1975 members for a live performance of the song. To promote the song, the band performed it on BBC Radio 1's Live Lounge and included it on the set list of their At Their Very Best tour.

== Background and recording ==
"Stand-up comedians are the underdog who go onstage, make a joke about themselves, and you like them because of that. That’s all I’ve ever done, and that’s easy. What’s harder is to go up onstage and say something that you mean, and it not have a punch line, and it may be attempting to deliver some moral message."

— Healy, on promoting sincerity in "All I Need to Hear".

In an interview with Justin Curto of Vulture, Healy said that "All I Need to Hear" was written with the intention of having a high level quality in each line, while purposely omitting any humorous elements, saying: "I wanted it to be a great song because I just needed to do that for me at the time". The singer said that due to his Northern English heritage, there is a common mentality of being sardonic in the presence of something sincere, which he described as making a joke or "taking the piss". Healy sought to challenge this mentality on "All I Need to Hear" by focusing on portraying sincerity in the lyrics, although he did not want to "make a meal out of this idea". The singer explained to Curto that writing self-deprecating lyrics is akin to a stand-up comedian making a joke about their life, saying it was easier and offered protection, while presenting something honest and sincere was more difficult and requires vulnerability.

During the writing process for "All I Need to Hear", Healy was primarily influenced by Paul Simon's "Still Crazy After All These Years" (1976). The singer noted that while both he and Simon were similarly verbose, the latter had managed to make "Still Crazy After All These Years" "really, really tight" and "lullaby-esque", which inspired him to create a song that would emulate the track's sincerity and earnestness. Healy said "All I Need to Hear" was specifically written so that it did not require him to sing it, with the 1975 striving to make the song sound like a cover. The singer struggled with the track's development and the messaging behind it, saying it is "one of those songs where it's like I've stepped out of the Mattyness of everything". Nonetheless, Healy said the song came naturally and it was recorded in one take, with the singer describing it as sounding like "a song that has always existed because it’s the sentiment that’s always existed". Healy opined that the result did sound like a cover, while also deeming it among his best songs and most successful writing exercises. The singer compared "All I Need to Hear" to the band's "I Couldn't Be More in Love" (2018), telling Zane Lowe of Apple Music 1 that he realised these songs could be performed better than he was capable of, saying he hoped that an artist like Adele or Joe Cocker would cover the track and create the "definitive" version.

== Release ==
On 22 October 2021, Healy made a surprise guest appearance during the second night of Phoebe Bridgers' Reunion Tour in Los Angeles at the Greek Theatre. After performing their duet, "Jesus Christ 2005 God Bless America" (2020), the singer proceeded to perform a solo acoustic set, where he performed a version of the then unreleased song "New York" by Benjamin Francis Leftwich and an untitled original song. During the untitled song, Healy sang: "I get out my records when you go away / People are talking, I miss what they say / ‘Cause it all means nothing, my dear, if I can’t be holding you near / So tell me you love me ’cause that’s all I need to hear." On 16 September 2022, the 1975 posted an announcement on their social media accounts revealing that "All I Need to Hear" would be released later that week. Fans began speculating that the song was the acoustic track performed at Bridgers' concert, while the band began posting short film-esque black-and-white visuals on their TikTok with snippets on the song in the background. On 21 September, "All I Need to Hear" was officially released by Dirty Hit and Polydor Records.

== Music and lyrics ==
"All I Need to Hear"
A 21-second sample of "All I Need to Hear", showcasing Healy's appeals for reciprocation from his former lover over a sleepy drum beat, sombre gospel piano, poignant strings and pedal steel guitar flickers.

Musically, "All I Need to Hear" is a soft, downtempo, piano ballad slow jam, composed in the style of blue-eyed soul. Drawing influence from country soul, blues, country, jazz, roots and soul music, the song has a length of three minutes and thirty seconds (3:30). The track was written by the 1975 members Matty Healy and George Daniel alongside Jamie Squire, while the former two handled the production in collaboration with Jack Antonoff. According to sheet music published at Musicnotes.com by Hal Leonard Music Publishing, "All I Need to Hear" is set in the time signature of common time with a slow tempo of 46 beats per minute. The song is composed in the key of E major, with Healy's vocals ranging between the notes of E_{4} and G♯_{5}. It follows a chord progression of E–C♯m_{7}–B–Bsus_{4}–B in the verses and E–D♯_{7}–G♯m–C♯_{7}–C♯m_{7}–F♯–B–Bsus_{4}–B in the chorus'. Described by Rhian Daly of NME as a "melancholy waltz", "All I Need to Hear" features a stripped-down production built around a blues-influenced chord sequence and echoes of fragmented guitar noise, with the song being devoid of any tension. The instrumentation is composed of a tender and sombre gospel piano, acoustic guitars, a sleepy drum beat, poignant strings and occasional pedal steel guitar flickers.

A love song, "All I Need to Hear" focuses on themes of heartbreak and isolation following a lost love, with Healy emphasising the single-mindedness and all-consuming nature of his affection. Lyrically, the song discusses how material possessions and other relationships are meaningless for Healy if the singer is not with his true love. In the first verse, Healy describes the ways he tries to distract himself when his lover is gone, such as listening to music and socialising, although the latter bores him. The singer expands further upon this in the first chorus, where he seeks reciprocal love, singing: "'Cause it all means nothing, my dear / If I can't be holding you near / So tell me you love me / 'Cause that's all that I need to hear". In the second verse, Healy's all-consuming love and longing for his partner leads him to stop eating and self-isolate, revealing that he would give up music and fame to have his lover's affection, singing: "'Cause I don't need music in my ears / I don't need the crowds and the cheers". During the bridge, the singer believes his partner to be his true love, while the lyrics in the third verse imply that Healy's love is unrequited, with his messages, calls and letters go unanswered. Although it is alluded to in the beginning of "All I Need to Hear" that the separation between the singer and his partner is temporary, the outro and final chorus suggest a permanent breakup, with Healy still retaining hope for the relationship's reconciliation, singing: "Oh, I don't care if you're insincere / Just tell me what I want to hear / You know where to find me / The place where we lived all these years, oh".

Paolo Ragusa of Consequence described the song as a "slow-dance ballad that serves as one of the album’s tender centers". Similarly, Daly said the song represents "one of the slower, statelier songs" on Being Funny in a Foreign Language, while Molly Marsh of Gigwise classified it as a "stark and straightforward ballad". Speaking on the influence of country music in the song, the Evening Standard writer David Smyth said the song is "one harmonica solo" away from becoming "an all-out country ballad". Neil McCormick of The Daily Telegraph said the song sees Healy in a "deeply romantic mood, swapping irony for gauche sincerity". Uproxx writer Derrick Rossignol remarked that "All I Need to Hear" deviates from the otherwise comedic tone present on Being Funny in a Foreign Language, describing the song as a "warm, downtempo, soulful ballad". Observing a similar deviation from the album's other singles, Scott Russell of Paste opined that in contrast to the prior three releases, the song brings Healy's vocals to the forefront. Alex Swhear of Variety compared the melody to Beyoncé's "Sandcastles" (2016), while Philip Giouras of Gigwise compared the song to the work of Simon & Garfunkel and Chris DeVille of Stereogum said the song "channels Wilco in piano ballad mode".

== Reception ==
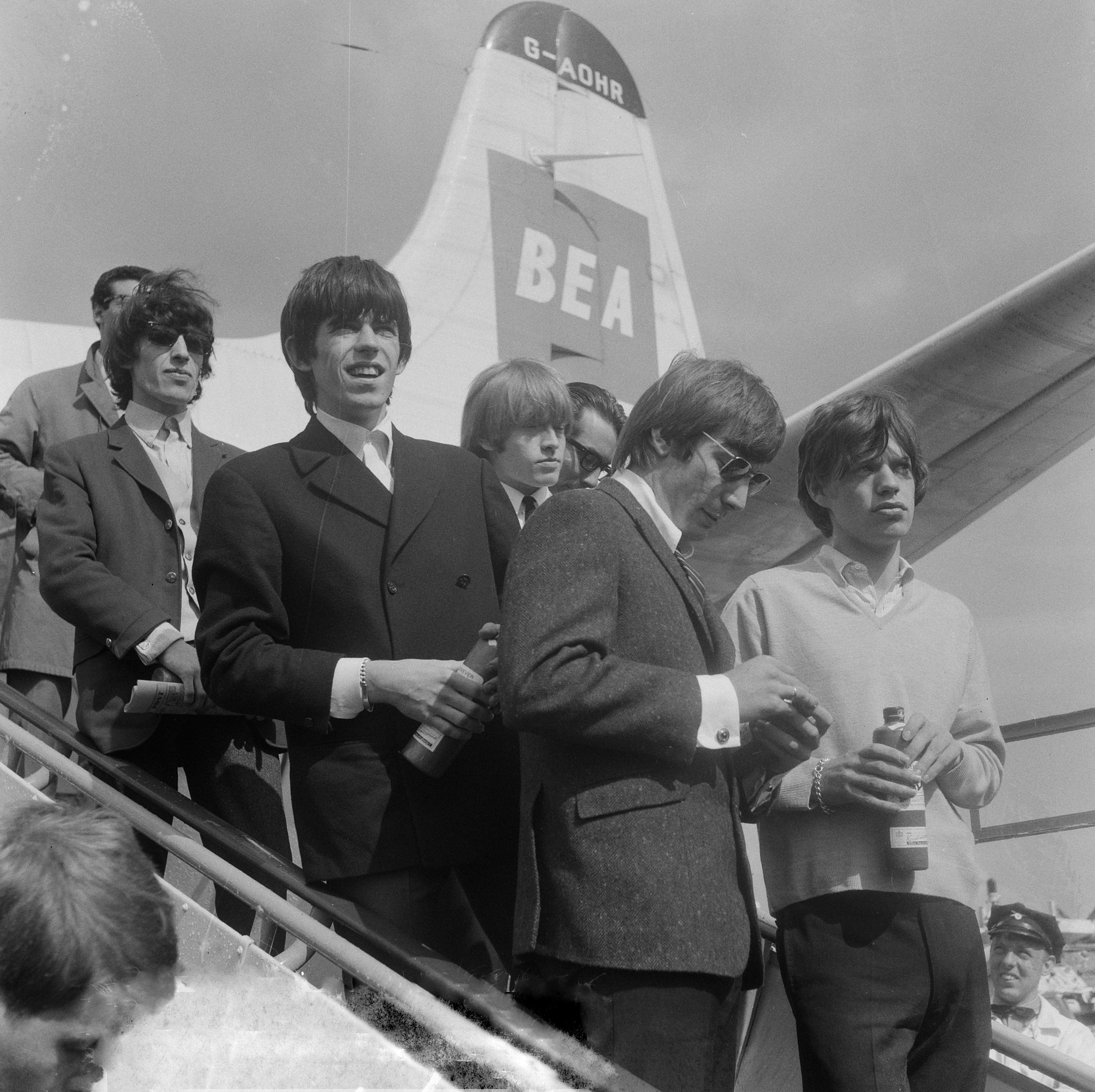
"All I Need to Hear" received comparisons to the works of the Rolling Stones (left) and Billy Joel (right).

Upon release, "All I Need to Hear" received positive reviews from contemporary music critics, who commended the song's understated, simplistic tone and the emotional vulnerability in the lyrics, with several deeming it a career highlight. In a positive review, Brady Brickner-Wood of Pitchfork said: "['All I Need to Hear' is] simple but inimitable, general but specific—in a word, it's honest, an elusive quality that separates the 1975 from their mainstream rock contemporaries." Writing for The Skinny, Dylan Tuck said that he observed a "subtle simplicity" to the song. In a ranking of the 1975's songs for NME, Daly listed the track at number 35, saying: "It's incredibly understated but that’s where it wields its power, its despondent glimmers reeling you in as Healy asks: 'Just tell me what I want to hear'". Ryan Bulbeck of Renowned for Sound said "All I Need to Hear" serves as a "perfectly positioned" quiet moment on the album. Calling the song sincere and stripped-down but still "[quintessentially] the 1975", Kelsey Sullivan of Soundigest deemed it the band's best single release of the year; the writer praised the song's earnest and honest lyrics, simplicity of the production, Healy's vocals and the integration of the band's old and new musical styles, calling it a "work of art".

In their reviews, numerous critics highlighted the earnestness and emotionally vulnerability of the lyrics in "All I Need to Hear". Steve Erickson of Slant Magazine said the song finds honesty in the "seemingly banal", while Genius writer Leah Degrazia said it sees Healy "trad[ing] cryptic social commentary for earnest romance". Deeming the track an album highlight, Ragusa wrote that it is "almost surprising to hear Healy be so sincere and sweet without immediately discounting himself". Rolling Stone's Maura Johnston called the ballad "emotionally arresting" and wrote that it resembled the product of a casual jam session, while Dan Hyman of The Washington Post called the single one of the "most affecting" songs on the album. Madison North of Magnetic Magazine gave "All I Need to Hear" a positive review and said it "certainly is all you need to hear"; deeming the song "deeply vulnerable", the writer said the track trades "bells and whistles" for "emotions and heartfelt lyrics", comparing it to the 1975's "Be My Mistake" (2016). Declaring "All I Need to Hear" among the best new tracks of the week, Rossignol praised the song's vulnerability, emotional context and Healy's vocals. Calling it "nostalgic and reflective", the editorial staff of DIY praised the contrast between "All I Need to Hear" and previous single "I'm in Love with You", comparing it to the soundtrack of The Boat That Rocked (2009) and writing that the song would "incite goosebumps" at the band's concert.

Several reviewers considered "All I Need to Hear" to be a career highlight for the 1975. Ben Devlin of MusicOMH declared the track to "easily" be among the greatest songs of the band's career; he praised the unironic and heartfelt lyrics while noting "tasteful" influences of Billy Joel and Randy Newman. Writing for Dork, Stephen Ackroyd said the single is potentially the "warmest and most classic" track of the band's career. In Gigwise's list of the band's best songs, Molly Marsh ranked "All I Need to Hear" at number 39; the writer praised the song's replay value and said it "cast a spell" over her, while also saying the track's "unblinking earnestness" almost made her believe Healy "may have taken off his irony hat for good". Jordan Darville of The Fader said the track is a "workhorse of blue-eyed soul built for doing the heavy lifting at weddings", while NME writer Tom Skinner called it tender and Smyth deemed the song beautiful. Robert Moran of The Sydney Morning Herald compared "All I Need to Hear" to the Rolling Stones, while The Arts Desk's Nick Hasted called Healy a "convincingly sensitive piano man" and compared the song to the works of Billy Joel, Villa Nellcôte and the Rolling Stones. In a mixed review, Claire Biddles of The Line of Best Fit called the track a "solidly written soul-ish [ballad]", but noted that it did not compare to the band's best work. Commercially, "All I Need to Hear" peaked at number 36 on the UK Indie Chart, number 21 on the New Zealand Hot Singles chart and number 12 on the Billboard Japan Japan Hot Overseas chart.

== Music video and live performances ==
A music video, directed by Samuel Bradley, was released on 21 September 2022. Shot in a documentary style, the black-and-white visual begins as a mockumentary, with Healy revisiting Peter Gabriel's Real World Studios in Box, Wiltshire, England, which served as the recording studio for Being Funny in a Foreign Language. The singer is shown wandering in a wooded area wearing a trench coat, looking at a pond and the sky before stopping to admire a swan. While speaking into his phone, Healy engages in a monologue where he discusses the nature of art, identity, the façade of reality and the relationships among the 1975 members. Although the viewer can hear snippets of the singer's responses, the questions themselves are omitted. Later, Healy is seen paddling a canoe as he says: "It sounds like a pretentious thing to say, but there’s a lot of figuring stuff out on this record: musically, philosophically, emotionally". After three minutes and fifteen seconds (3:15), the singer goes inside the studio to perform "All I Need to Hear" live with the other band members.

To promote the song, the 1975 performed it on BBC Radio 1's Live Lounge on 11 October. "All I Need to Hear" was also included on the set list for the band's At Their Very Best concert tour.

== Charts ==
Chart performance for "All I Need to Hear"
Chart (2022-2026)	Peak position
Japan Hot Overseas (Billboard Japan)	12
New Zealand Hot Singles (RMNZ)	21
Philippines (Billboard Philippines Hot 100)	30
UK Indie (Official Charts)	36

== Credits and personnel ==
Credits adapted from Being Funny in a Foreign Language album liner notes.

- Matthew Healy – composer, producer, guitar, vocals
- George Daniel – composer, producer, programming, drums
- Adam Hann – guitar
- Ross MacDonald – bass
- Jamie Squire – composer
- Jack Antonoff – producer
- Robin Schmidt – mastering engineer
- Laura Sisk – sound engineer
- Oli Jacobs – sound engineer
- Manny Marroquin – mixing engineer
- Chris Galland – mixing engineer

== See also ==
- The 1975 discography
- List of songs by Matty Healy
