= Still... At Their Very Best =

2023–24 concert tour by the 1975

- Tour by The 1975
- Teaser poster
- Location: Europe; North America
- Associated album: Being Funny in a Foreign Language
- Start date: 16 September 2023
- End date: 24 March 2024
- Legs: 2
- No. of shows: 60
- Supporting acts: Dora Jar; The Japanese House; Been Stellar
- Website: the1975.com/tour

The 1975 concert chronology
- At Their Very Best (2022–2023); Still... At Their Very Best (2023–2024)

Still... At Their Very Best was the fifth concert tour by English indie art pop band the 1975 in support of their fifth studio album Being Funny in a Foreign Language (2022), and a follow-up of their acclaimed At Their Very Best world tour "featuring newly expanded production".

It commenced in September 2023 with a North American leg across arenas in the United States and Canada, marking their biggest tour yet in the region. In 2024, the band staged the world's first ever "carbon-removed" events across their four shows at the O2 Arena in London.

== Background ==
In May 2023, during the band's headlining show at BBC Radio 1's Big Weekend in Scotland, frontman Matty Healy was noted to wear a lab coat with a "Matty" name tag which was a departure from his At Their Very Best tour wardrobe. By June, the band's social media accounts posted promotional materials about a new concert tour including a poster of Healy kneeling on a patch of grass wearing a lab coat.

The fourth episode of the band's A Theatrical Performance of an Intimate Moment short film webseries shows Healy in a laboratory discarding a lab coat with the name tag "Truman Black", a known alias of Healy's, and choosing to wear the lab coat with the name tag "Matty". On 23 September, Healy posted a political campaign-type of video centering on redemption to promote the tour.

=== World's first "carbon-removed" events ===
The band's four shows at the O2 Arena in London in 2024 marked the world's first-ever carbon-removed events. This involves CO_{2} generated by the events – from the light show to the audience – being physically sucked out of the air, as well as more traditional techniques such as planting trees and spreading CO_{2} absorbing volcanic rock on farmland, where it also acts as a fertiliser.

== Concert synopsis ==
The show, written and directed by Healy, is an expansion of the band's previous tour, reusing the same house-like set design by Tobias Rylander and following a similar premise and two-part structure. Additions to the show include a large LED screen behind the house set that displays concert visuals, as well as a second, smaller stage at the center of the concert venue, which resembles a square patch of grass. After crawling through a television screen on the main stage during the "Consumption" interlude, Healy emerges on the B-stage for the show's middle act (titled "Matty's Nightmare"), where he caresses and lays next to a naked wax replica of himself. The replica is then lowered beneath the stage and replaced with a guitar and microphone for Healy to perform an acoustic rendition of the track "Be My Mistake" from the band's third album, A Brief Inquiry into Online Relationships. Healy returns to the main stage afterwards to perform the rest of the set, but reemerges on the B-stage during the encore to perform "People", and is sometimes joined by other members of the band.

Some shows contain a second interlude titled "Social Media Pandering Parody", where Healy projects trending news clips onto the screens while reading satirical commentary on current events from a cellphone to the audience. At the October 29, 2023 show in Chicago, Healy ate a prop cellphone onstage as part of the parody segment. Meanwhile, at the October 10, 2023 in Fort Worth, Texas, Healy delivered an impassioned 10-minute speech defending the band's pro-LGBT demonstration during their performance at the 2023 Good Vibes Festival in Malaysia, where they were subsequently banned from performing. Healy particularly criticized the "liberal outrage" against the band after the incident, which he perceived as hypocritical in light of Malaysia's widespread anti-LGBT laws, and further refuted accusations against the band of "cultural insensitivity" and "colonialism", stating, "[liberals'] unconditional belief in inclusivity and tolerance has led them to indirectly support a government which is intolerant of their own existence."

== Tour dates ==
List of 2023 concerts, showing date, city, country, venue, and opening act
Date	City	Country	Venue	Opening acts	Attendance	Revenue
16 September 2023 (Note: The concert on 16 September 2023 at Piedmont Park in Atlanta, United States is part of Music Midtown.)	Atlanta	United States	Piedmont Park	—N/a	—N/a	—N/a
23 September 2023 (Note: The concert on 23 September 2023 at Downtown Las Vegas in Las Vegas, United States is part of Life Is Beautiful Music & Art Festival.)	Las Vegas	United States	Downtown Las Vegas	—N/a	—N/a	—N/a
26 September 2023	Sacramento	United States	Golden 1 Center	Dora Jar	—	—
28 September 2023	San Jose	United States	SAP Center	Dora Jar	—	—
30 September 2023	San Diego	United States	Pechanga Arena	Dora Jar	—	—
2 October 2023	Los Angeles	United States	Hollywood Bowl	Dora Jar	—	
5 October 2023	Glendale	United States	Desert Diamond Arena	Dora Jar	—	
7 October 2023	Greenwood Village	United States	Fiddler's Green Amphitheatre	Dora Jar	—	
9 October 2023	Fort Worth	United States	Dickies Arena	Dora Jar	—	
12 October 2023	New Orleans	United States	Smoothie King Center	Dora Jar	—	
14 October 2023 (Note: The concert on 14 October 2023 at the Zilker Park in Austin, United States is part of Austin City Limits Music Festival.)	Austin	United States	Zilker Park	—N/a	—N/a	—N/a
17 October 2023	Miami	United States	Kaseya Center	Dora Jar	—	—
18 October 2023	Tampa	United States	Amalie Arena	Dora Jar	—	—
20 October 2023	Charlotte	United States	Spectrum Center	Dora Jar	—	—
22 October 2023	Nashville	United States	Bridgestone Arena	Dora Jar	—	—
23 October 2023	St. Louis	United States	Enterprise Center	Dora Jar	—	—
25 October 2023	Kansas City	United States	T-Mobile Center	Dora Jar	—	—
26 October 2023	Minneapolis	United States	Target Center	Dora Jar	—	—
28 October 2023	Milwaukee	United States	Fiserv Forum	Dora Jar	—	—
29 October 2023	Rosemont (Note: Promoted as Chicago)	United States	Allstate Arena	Dora Jar	—	—
31 October 2023	Detroit	United States	Little Caesars Arena	Dora Jar	—	—
2 November 2023	Indianapolis	United States	Gainbridge Fieldhouse	Dora Jar	—	—
3 November 2023	Columbus	United States	Nationwide Arena	Dora Jar	—	—
5 November 2023	Pittsburgh	United States	PPG Paints Arena	Dora Jar	—	—
7 November 2023	Newark	United States	Prudential Center	Dora Jar	—	—
8 November 2023	Baltimore	United States	CFG Bank Arena	Dora Jar	—	—
10 November 2023	Philadelphia	United States	Wells Fargo Center	Dora Jar	—	—
12 November 2023	Boston	United States	TD Garden	Dora Jar	—	—
14 November 2023	New York City	United States	Madison Square Garden	Dora Jar	—	—
15 November 2023	New York City	United States	Madison Square Garden	Dora Jar	—	—
17 November 2023	Montreal	Canada	Bell Centre	Dora Jar	—	—
18 November 2023	Toronto	Canada	Scotiabank Arena	Dora Jar	—	—
20 November 2023	London	Canada	Budweiser Gardens	Dora Jar	—	—
22 November 2023	Grand Rapids	United States	Van Andel Arena	Dora Jar	—	—
26 November 2023	Salt Lake City	United States	Delta Center	Dora Jar	—	—
27 November 2023	Boise	United States	ExtraMile Arena	Dora Jar	—	—
29 November 2023	Vancouver	Canada	Rogers Arena	Dora Jar	—	—
1 December 2023	Portland	United States	Moda Center	Dora Jar	—	—
2 December 2023	Seattle	United States	Climate Pledge Arena	Dora Jar	—	—

List of 2024 concerts, showing date, city, country, venue, and opening act
Date	City	Country	Venue	Opening acts	Attendance	Revenue
13 January 2024	Anaheim (Note: The concert on 13 January 2024 in Anaheim, California is part of iHeartRadio's AlterEgo.)	United States	Honda Center	—N/a	—N/a	—N/a
8 February 2024	Glasgow	Scotland	OVO Hydro	The Japanese House	—	—
9 February 2024	Glasgow	Scotland	OVO Hydro	The Japanese House	—	—
12 February 2024	London	England	The O2 Arena	The Japanese House	—	—
13 February 2024	London	England	The O2 Arena	The Japanese House	—	—
14 February 2024	London	England	The O2 Arena	The Japanese House	—	—
17 February 2024	Manchester	England	AO Arena	The Japanese House	—	—
18 February 2024	Manchester	England	AO Arena	The Japanese House	—	—
20 February 2024	London	England	The O2 Arena	The Japanese House	—	—
21 February 2024	Birmingham	England	Resorts World Arena	The Japanese House	—	—
26 February 2024	Lisbon	Portugal	Campo Pequeno	Been Stellar	—	—
27 February 2024	Madrid	Spain	WiZink Center	Been Stellar	—	—
1 March 2024	Paris	France	Le Zénith	Been Stellar	—	—
2 March 2024	Amsterdam	Netherlands	AFAS Live	Been Stellar	—	—
3 March 2024	Brussels	Belgium	Forest National	Been Stellar	—	—
5 March 2024	Hamburg	Germany	Barclays Arena	Been Stellar	—	—
7 March 2024	Oslo	Norway	Oslo Spektrum	Been Stellar	—	—
8 March 2024	Stockholm	Sweden	Tele2 Arena	Been Stellar	—	—
10 March 2024	Copenhagen	Denmark	KB Hallen	Been Stellar	—	—
12 March 2024	Berlin	Germany	Mercedes-Benz Arena	Been Stellar	—	—
13 March 2024	Warsaw	Poland	Arena COS Torwar	Been Stellar	—	—
14 March 2024	Prague	Czech Republic	Sportovní hala Fortuna	Been Stellar	—	—
16 March 2024	Zürich	Switzerland	Hallenstadion	Been Stellar	—	—
18 March 2024	Munich	Germany	Zenith (building)	Been Stellar	—	—
19 March 2024	Milan	Italy	Mediolanum Forum	Been Stellar	—	—
21 March 2024	Frankfurt	Germany	Jahrhunderthalle	Been Stellar	—	—
22 March 2024	Cologne	Germany	Palladium (Cologne)	Been Stellar	—	—
24 March 2024	Amsterdam	Netherlands	AFAS Live	Been Stellar	—	—
