= Robbers (The 1975 song) =

2014 single by The 1975

Single by The 1975

from the album The 1975
- Released: 26 May 2014
- Recorded: 2012–2013
- Genre: Pop rock
- Length: 4:14
- Label: Dirty Hit
- Songwriters: Matthew Healy, George Daniel, Adam Hann, Ross MacDonald
- Producers: Matthew Healy, George Daniel, Mike Crossey

The 1975 singles chronology
"Settle Down" (2014)	"Robbers" (2014)	"Heart Out" (2014)

Music video
- "Robbers" on YouTube

"Robbers" is a song by English rock band The 1975, released as the sixth single from their self-titled debut on 26 May 2014.

== Background ==
The concept of the song, about an ill-fated robbery heist, was inspired by the 1993 film True Romance, particularly Patricia Arquette's character Alabama Worley.

Following its release, it debuted at number 179 on the UK Singles Chart.

The song, thematically, is an ode to toxic relationships. This song's lyrical content concerns two lovers who aren't good for each other. With the message that they know that their relationship will one day end, but they are still holding each other, robbing happiness from each other and pretending that they will be happy forever.

Healy has stated that the song and music video was inspired by one of the singer's favorite movie characters. "I got really obsessed with the idea behind Patricia Arquette's character in True Romance when I was about 18," he said. "That craving for the bad boy in that film, it's so sexualized," he added. "It was something I was obsessed with."

"'Robbers' is about a heist that goes wrong," Healy added. "I suppose you can read it as a metaphor, and a girl who's obsessed with her professional killer boyfriend. It's a romantic ideal."

== Music video ==
The official music video for "Robbers" was released on 27 April 2014, directed by Tim Mattia. A large portion of the video was filmed in Taft, California. The video stars Healy and actress Chelsea Schuchman as a couple who rob a shop to obtain money to "fund their alcohol and drug addiction", with the other band members appearing as their friends. Despite Healy sustaining a shot in the stomach, the heist ends up a success.

Shot by DOP Jackson Hunt. Production Design and Costumes by Alexis Johnson. Produced by Taylor Vandegrift of Cineaste Films. Kenneth Taylor worked as 1st AD on the video.

== Personnel ==
Adapted from liner notes.

- Matthew Healy – vocals, guitar, songwriter, producer
- Adam Hann – guitar, songwriter, producer
- George Daniel – drums, songwriter, producer
- Ross MacDonald – bass guitar, songwriter, producer

Additional personnel

- Mike Crossey – mixing, production
- Mike Spink – engineering
- Jonathan Gilmore – Pro-Tools engineering, additional programming
- Robin Schmidt – mastering

== Charts ==
Chart (2014)	Peak position
Belgium (Ultratip Bubbling Under Flanders)	65
UK Singles (Official Charts Company)	179

== Certifications ==
Region	Certification	Certified units/sales
Brazil (Pro-Música Brasil)	Gold	30,000^{‡}
New Zealand (RMNZ)	Platinum	30,000^{‡}
United Kingdom (BPI)	Platinum	600,000^{‡}
United States (RIAA)	Platinum	1,000,000^{‡}
^{‡} Sales+streaming figures based on certification alone.

== Release history ==
Region	Date	Format	Label
United Kingdom	26 May 2014	Contemporary hit radio	Dirty Hit

== See also ==
- The 1975 discography
- List of songs by Matty Healy
- The 1975 (Album)
