= I'm in Love with You (The 1975 song) =

Single by the 1975

from the album Being Funny in a Foreign Language
- Released: 1 September 2022
- Genre: Pop
- Length: 4:22
- Label: Dirty Hit
- Songwriters: Matthew Healy; George Daniel; Adam Hann
- Producers: Matthew Healy; George Daniel; Jack Antonoff

The 1975 singles chronology
"Happiness" (2022)	"I'm in Love with You" (2022)	"All I Need to Hear" (2022)

Music video
- "I'm in Love with You" on YouTube

"I'm in Love with You" is a song by English band the 1975 from their fifth studio album, Being Funny in a Foreign Language (2022). The song was released on 1 September 2022 through Dirty Hit and Polydor Records as the third single from the album. It was written by band members Matty Healy, George Daniel and Adam Hann. Production of the song was handled by Healy, Daniel and Jack Antonoff, while American singer-songwriter Phoebe Bridgers provides backing vocals. Initially written to include an ironic, tongue-in-cheek tone, Healy was challenged by his co-writers to create a song that was earnest and unabashedly about falling in love. Using his relationship with FKA Twigs as inspiration, Healy wrote the song with the notion that love supersedes all cultural and political differences within a relationship.

An upbeat 1980s-style pop song, "I'm in Love with You" incorporates elements of disco, synth-pop, electropop, bubblegum pop and sophisti-pop. The song's acoustic guitar-driven production is composed of a disco groove, pop hooks, snappy acoustics, jangly guitars, synths and strings. Thematically, it is a love song written as an ode to romance. Using a conventional song structure, the lyrics recount an experience of falling in love, with Healy finding it difficult to express admiration for his partner. Upon release, the song was met with generally positive reviews from contemporary music critics, who praised the song's earnestness, simplicity and use of pop music, although it did receive some criticism for its lyrical content. Despite this, the song appeared on numerous year-end lists, including Consequence, The Fader and i-D.

Commercially, "I'm in Love with You" reached number 29 on the UK Singles Chart, number 57 in Ireland, number 27 on the US Billboard Hot Rock & Alternative Songs chart, number 4 on the New Zealand Hot Singles chart and number 5 on the Billboard Japan Japan Hot Overseas chart. An accompanying music video, directed by Samuel Bradley, was released on 1 September 2022. Inspired by the works of actor Buster Keaton and filmmaker Federico Fellini, the black-and-white visual serves as a sequel to the 1975's "A Change of Heart" (2016) and features the band as clowns, with Healy attempting to pursue his love interest from the original video. The visual received positive reviews from critics, who complimented the choreography and cinematography, comparing it to a silent film. To promote the song, the band performed on various television shows, including The Tonight Show Starring Jimmy Fallon and Saturday Night Live.

== Background and recording ==
"I wanted to make a record where I was like, 'I'm just going to do a song that's called ['I'm in Love with You'] and just swing the bat, and not debase it and make a dick joke — I mean, I do make a lot of dick jokes — but, in the moment, I try and be really earnest because I kind of almost haven't done that yet."

— Healy, on creating "I'm in Love with You".

During the initial writing and recording of "I'm in Love with You", Healy sought to create a "traditional" the 1975 song that nullified the earnestness of the track's lyrics. In an interview with Justin Curto of Vulture, the singer revealed that he struggled in the recording booth to find a word that would "negate the sentimentality a little bit", and debated rewriting the refrain as "I'm not in love with you" or "I'm not quite in love with you" to make the song tongue in cheek. Daniel and Hann, realising Healy's intention, challenged him on the lyric and told the singer: " ...the whole thing that you're doing at the moment is being in the present. If it sounds like the song's called 'I'm in Love With You,' write a song called 'I'm in Love With You' about being in love with you." In response, Healy told them "OK, fuck it. I'll just write a song about being in love".

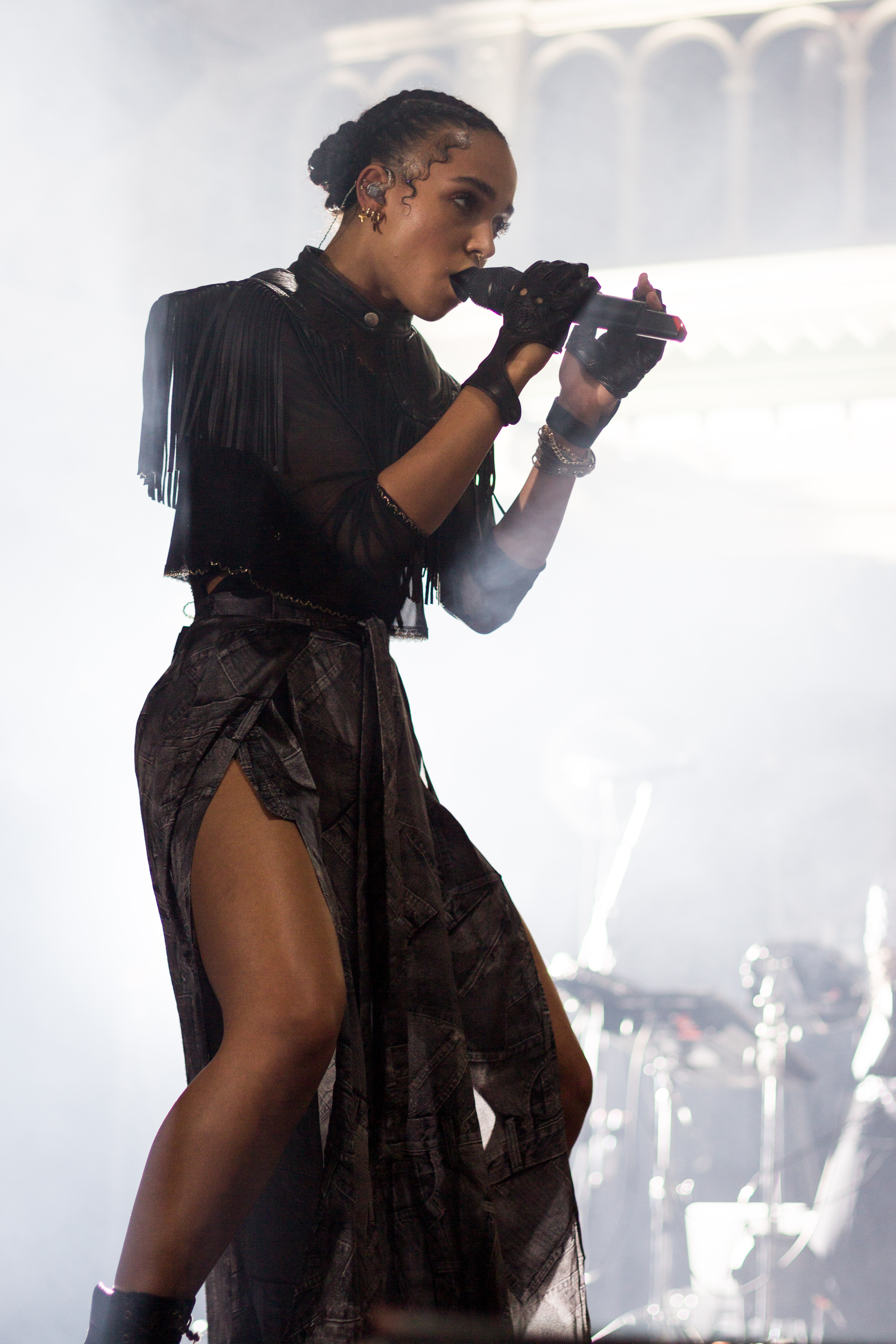
"I'm in Love with You" was inspired by Healy's relationship with FKA Twigs.

Inspired by his relationship with English singer FKA Twigs at the time of the song's recording, Healy chose to write "I'm in Love with You" based on his love for her. The singer told Curto that being a mixed-race couple inspired a couplet in the song that was specific to their relationship: "You show me your Black-girl thing, pretending that I know what it is (I wasn't listening) / I apologize; you meet my eyes / Yeah, it's simple, and it goes like this." The line stemmed from her use of culturally-specific, black cosmetic products in their bathroom that Healy was not aware of, which the singer said was an example of conversations about race that occur when living together in a mixed-race relationship. Healy said that the couplet represents the idea that despite differences in culture and personality, any details become insignificant once a person falls in love, saying that he "should have been focusing on what it was, but in that moment, I didn't care about anything cultural or political. I just loved her".

On 22 August 2022, the 1975 debuted "I'm in Love with You" during a live performance at Japan's Summer Sonic Festival. On 26 August, the 1975 released a video on their social media channels announcing that the song would be released the following week as the third single from Being Funny in a Foreign Language, following "Part of the Band" and "Happiness". On 1 September, "I'm in Love with You" was officially released by Dirty Hit and Polydor Records.

== Music and lyrics ==
"I'm in Love with You"
A 26-second sample of "I'm in Love with You", showcasing the song's first verse and chorus, with Healy repeating the song's refrain over a "galloping" disco groove, jangly guitars, synths and soaring strings.

Musically, "I'm in Love with You" is an upbeat, 1980s-inspired pop song. The song was written by the 1975 members Matty Healy, George Daniel and Adam Hann, while the former two handled the production in collaboration with Jack Antonoff. American singer-songwriter Phoebe Bridgers provides backing vocals on the track. According to sheet music published at Musicnotes.com by Hal Leonard Music Publishing, "I'm in Love with You" is set in the time signature of common time with a moderate tempo of 118 beats per minute. The track is composed in the key of D major, with Healy's vocals ranging between the notes of A_{4} and A_{5}. It follows a chord progression of Em9–A–D–Gmaj7–A–D. Drawing influence from disco, synth-pop, electropop, bubblegum pop and sophisti-pop, the song's acoustic guitar-driven production is composed of a "galloping" disco groove, "warm", upbeat rhythms, pop hooks, "snappy" and "zingy" acoustics, jangly guitars, synths and soaring strings.

Thematically, "I'm in Love with You" is a love song written as an ode to romance. Lyrically, "I'm in Love with You" recounts an experience of falling in love, with Healy finding difficulty in expressing his feelings to a partner before finally admitting his feelings of love and admiration. The song is written using a conventional song structure, with the singer repeating the track's refrain and title phrase ("I'm in love with you / I, I, I, I") a total of 24 times throughout the single. In the bridge, Healy reminds himself to be careful in a tongue-in-cheek manner, singing: "I just got to keep it / Don’t fuck it, you muppet". As the song reaches its crescendo, Healy sings in a celebratory tone: "It's not that deep / Well, I've been countin' / My blessings / Thinkin' this through / It's like: one, two, yeah / I'm in love with you, I- I- I- I- I".

Adrian Garro of Rock Cellar said the chorus "repeats enough times to grab hold of your consciousness and not let go". Pitchfork's Ryan Dombal found "I'm in Love with You" to be "disarmingly direct", a sentiment shared by Tyler Jenke of Music Feeds, who called it "one of the 1975's most straightforward songs to date" and described the track as being built around a "series of pop hooks and clear-eyed optimism". Yashavi Upasani of B-Sides said the song acts as a sequel to the 1975's "A Change of Heart" (2016), writing that it "[brings] in the same themes of love despite the lack of understanding within a relationship". Philip Giouras of Gigwise classified the track as "sprinkly pop", while Scott Russell of Paste described the song as "ebullient, danceable guitar-pop", and Arun Starkey of Far Out called the track "a more upbeat, summery number" and an indication of the band's return to the "kaleidoscopic synth-pop of their early years". Additionally, Alessandro DeCaro of the Alternative Press observed influences of 1990s alternative music, calling it an homage to bands such as the Cure and the Lemonheads.

== Reception ==
Upon release, "I'm in Love with You" received generally positive reviews from contemporary music critics, with several reviewers praising the 1975's use of pop music. Paolo Ragusa of Consequence said that "I'm in Love with You" is an album highlight; the reviewer commended the "undeniably catchy" chorus and repetitive hook "that begs you not to smile", calling it "one of the most pure and radiantly cheerful songs [that the 1975 has] ever released" and comparing it to "The Sound" (2016). Katie Rosendale of Local Spins also deemed the song an album highlight, while Callie Ahlgrim of Insider declared it to be one of the best tracks of the 1975's career. Ben Homewood of Music Week described "I'm in Love with You" as among "some of [the band's] poppiest music yet", an opinion echoed by Andrew Sacher of BrooklynVegan, who said the song sees the band "exploring their sugar-sweet jangle pop side". Similarly, Wren Graves of Consequence said the 1975 embraces "their inner poptimists" on the track, and Garro deemed it "perhaps the most accessible distillation of the group’s 1980s-inspired pop experimentation". The editorial staff of the Alternative Press deemed "I'm in Love with You" a "damn perfect pop [song]" that "capture[s] the effervescent feeling of love in sheeny guitars and synths". Additionally, the editorial staff of DIY called the song a "classic [the 1975] pop bop"., while Mark Kennedy of the Associated Press said it is a "delicious wave of glistening pop", and Vicky Greer of Gigwise wrote that the track represents the band "at their most poppy and playful".

Critics also highlighted the production and writing of "I'm in Love with You". Giouras praised the songs's production and use of layered instrumentation, saying that "whilst lyrically it's a very simple and delightful ode to romance, its accompanying instrumental is heavenly and complex". Upon the track's debut at the Summer Sonic Festival, Danielle Chelosky of Uproxx commended the "sparkling, jaunty song", highlighting its simplicity and "catchy" melody. In a separate review following the release of Being Funny in a Foreign Language, Chelosky characterised "I'm in Love with You" as "one of the most charismatic and buoyant" songs on the album, calling the track a "whirlwind of color and wholesomeness" while specifically highlighting the line: "Don’t fuck it, you muppet". Her colleague, Adrian Spinelli, deemed the single a "happy-go-lucky escape".

In a mixed review, Chris DeVille of Stereogum compared "I'm in Love with You" to "Happiness" and commended the song's earnestness, declaring it among the most direct of the band's catalogue and saying the track "locks into a groove and leans hard on the simplest of hooks". However, DeVille was critical of the songwriting, deeming it a "waste" of Healy's talents, saying: "Not every song needs to be a treatise and not every album an epic, but there’s a thin line between mature restraint and undercooked songwriting." The editorial staff of The Irish Times were similarly ambivalent, drawing a comparison between the track and the band's second studio album I Like It When You Sleep, for You Are So Beautiful yet So Unaware of It (2016), while criticising its choice as a single in comparison to the "catchy, engaging tracks such as 'Human Too'". Evan Sawdey of Yardbarker also gave "I'm in Love with You" a lukewarm response, highlighting its replay value but criticising the track's "hollow" sentiment. Commercially, "I'm in Love with You" peaked at number 29 on the UK Singles Chart, number 57 in Ireland, number 27 on the US Billboard Hot Rock & Alternative Songs chart, number 4 on the New Zealand Hot Singles chart and number 5 on the Billboard Japan Japan Hot Overseas chart.

=== Accolades ===
The Fader ranked "I'm in Love with You" at number 69 on their 2022 year-end songs list, i-D placed the song at number 85 on their year-end list, Yardbarker included the song on their list of 2022 year-end songs and Consequence placed the song at number 28 on their year-end list. Additionally, Dig! ranked "I'm in Love with You" at number 33 on their 2022 year-end songs list; Luke Edwards praised the "catchy" hook and repetitive chorus for being "custom-built for getting stuck in your head", while also comparing the song to the band's "If You’re Too Shy (Let Me Know)" (2020) and "TooTimeTooTimeTooTime" (2018). On Triple J's annual music listener poll, the Triple J Hottest 100, "I'm in Love with You" was ranked at number 58 for the 2022 edition.

Ahlgrim and Courteney Larocca of Insider named "I'm in Love with You" as one of the ten best songs of September 2022; the writers lauded the track's "rare and precious simplicity" and compared its "rush of classic Matt Healy magic" to the band's "The Sound" (2016) "Me & You Together Song" (2020) and "If You're Too Shy (Let Me Know)" (2020). Under the Radar listed "I'm in Love with You" as one of the 12 best songs of the week for the week ending 2 September. In a ranking of the 1975's songs, Molly Marsh of Gigwise placed "I'm in Love with You" at number 45, highlighting the track's "infectious" chorus which she said "carefully skirts the line between catchy and annoying". Marsh also praised the single's sincerity, writing that Healy "eschew his usual nudging and winking in favour of lovey-dovey earnestness". In a similar list of the band's work, NME's Rhian Daly ranked "I'm in Love with You" at number 16, characterising it a "pure, unabashed celebration of romance – but with a very 1975 edge". Daly called the song a rarity amongst the 1975's catalogue, deeming it timeless and sincere while still humorous, specifically the line: "Don't fuck it, you muppet".

== Music video ==
=== Development and release ===
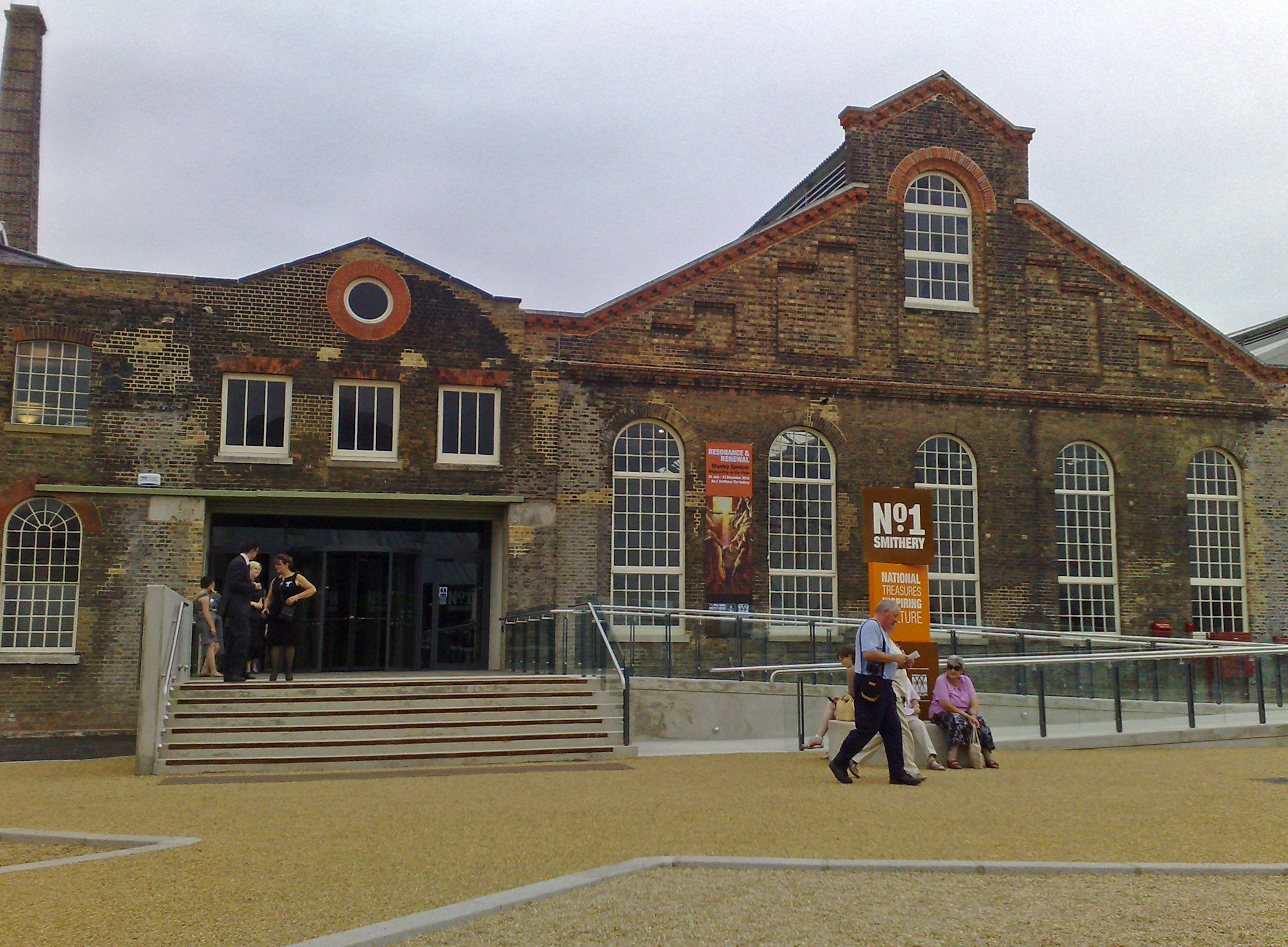
Filming for the "I'm in Love with You" video took place at the Chatham Historic Dockyard at Chatham in Kent, South East England.

The music video for "I'm in Love with You" was created by a collaboration between Healy, Samuel Bradley and Patricia Villirillo. The singer wrote the visual, while the latter two served as the director and the creative director, respectively. Healy was inspired by the works of American actor Buster Keaton and Italian filmmaker Federico Fellini, wanting to create the visual with as little technology as possible, and that the 1975 "wanted to [make] something that’s really impressive instead of leaning into technology all the time". The video was filmed in July 2022 at the Chatham Historic Dockyard at Chatham in Kent, South East England.

In an interview with Dombal prior to the release of the video, Healy revealed that the visual would function as a sequel to the band's "A Change of Heart" video, in which he portrayed a clown facing rejection. The singer wanted to exaggerate the ideas for the visual and "exaggerate the world", which included improving his dancing skills. Katie Collins, who portrayed Healy's love interest in the "A Change of Heart" video, returned to reprise her role in the visual and also served as the choreographer. Dance rehearsals for the music video took place over a week, which the singer described as "so intense that it felt like he had heat stroke". Furthermore, Healy revealed that Bridgers would feature in a cameo role. The visual was released on 1 September.

=== Synopsis ===
Portraying a clown, Healy (left) attempts to pursue Katie Collins' character (right), his love interest from the "A Change of Heart" (2016) music video.

The vintage-inspired black and white music video begins with Healy as a silent film clown, dressed in a tuxedo and wearing clown makeup, awakening on the floor of a tunnel in a town populated by clowns with exaggerated expressions and movements. Upon exiting the tunnel, the singer shows a picture of his love interest from the "A Change of Heart" video to a clown selling vapes, who tells Healy of her location. The singer arrives to a gathering of clowns, including the woman, performing various musical instruments, playing chess and eating popcorn. Healy attempts to court the woman, who rebuffs his advances and playfully tries to run away while his head is turned, and the two engage in a dance sequence consisting of mime-like, robotic dance moves. The woman passes Bridgers as she flees from the singer, who is sat on a bench in a clown ensemble while reading a newspaper with Healy's face printed on it. As they pass a disturbed Bridgers, she can be seen mouthing the words "What the fuck?".

As Healy continues to pursue the woman through the streets, he comes across the other members of the 1975, also dressed in clown makeup. The singer eventually finds his love interest, who attempts to strike him with a bowling pin, and the two perform another dance number in which she tries to float away from Healy. The singer is then shown dancing with a group of clowns at the entrance of the tunnel during the bridge of "I'm in Love with You". As the final chorus plays, the visual transitions to the 1975 performing without clown makeup at a festive concert in the middle of a street. Healy plays the guitar and dances on centre stage, with Bridgers performing beside him, and the two share a microphone. As the video concludes, a makeup-less Healy is reunited with his love interest and he urges the woman to remove her clown makeup. Although the woman obliges, the camera angle shifts to the singer's shocked reaction, and her real identity remains unknown.

Throughout the video, writing can be seen on the walls of the town's buildings – when put together, they form the sentence "Everyone is disappointing once you get to know them".

=== Critical reception ===
Hannah Dailey of Billboard said the 1975 had "[made] a circus out of their newest single music video", calling it "whimsical". Greer called the video a "a kind of clown-led" romantic comedy, while Mark Redfern of Under the Radar said the video contained a "silent movie vibe" and Spinelli called the video a "love story [...] wrapped into an interpretive dance number". Alli Patton of American Songwriter said the "I'm in Love with You" video encapsulated a dreamy and "monochrome harlequin world", praising the cinematography and Healy's dancing. Rob Ulitski of Promonews praised the cinematography, vintage aesthetic and Collins' performance, calling it a "beautifully made visual" that functioned as a reflection of the 1975 six years after "A Change of Heart". Jenke and Madison Bloom of Pitchfork compared Healy's character in the visual to the work of Keaton. Graves wrote that the visual was charming and praised the choreography, calling it a "kinesthetic wonder", while also comparing Healy's character to Keaton and English comedic actor Charlie Chaplin. Additionally, Charlotte Krol of Rolling Stone UK called the addition of Bridgers a "surprise".

== Live performances ==
Prior to its release, the 1975 performed "I'm in Love with You" in the middle of their setlist at the Summer Sonic Festival on 20 August 2022, despite Healy being "insistent they’d not be playing any unheard material" the day prior. Starkey declared the track as the highlight of the band's show. The band performed the song on 2 October on BBC's Later... with Jools Holland, with Bryan Kress of Consequence writing that Healy "seemed to want to shake free of his acoustic guitar with occasional hip shakes and one-legged spins". Reviewing the performance, Kress wrote that the singer's straightforward delivery complimented the track's "inherent earnestness" and praised Healy for adding a "unique [and] emotive twist" to each line of the chorus. On 11 October, the 1975 performed the song at BBC Maida Vale Studios for BBC Radio 1's Live Lounge. Writing for Hypebeast, Sarah Kearns called the rendition "dynamic". On 11 November, the band performed "I'm in Love with You" on The Tonight Show Starring Jimmy Fallon. Chelosky commended the performance, specifically Healy, saying the singer "still keeps up the energy, singing and moving with passion". DeVille praised Healy's vocals in the "spirited" rendition, writing that the band appeared to be enjoying themselves. On 12 March 2023, the 1975 performed the track on Saturday Night Live. Hilary Remley of Collider deemed it a memorable performance and praised Healy for being "his typical jaunty self".

== Charts ==
Chart performance for "I'm in Love with You"
Chart (2022)	Peak position
Ireland (IRMA)	57
Japan Hot Overseas (Billboard Japan)	5
New Zealand Hot Singles (RMNZ)	4
UK Singles (Official Charts)	29
US Hot Rock & Alternative Songs (Billboard)	27
US Rock & Alternative Airplay (Billboard)	12

== Certifications ==
Certifications and sales for "I’m in Love with You"
Region	Certification	Certified units/sales
New Zealand (RMNZ)	Gold	15,000^{‡}
United Kingdom (BPI)	Gold	400,000^{‡}
^{‡} Sales+streaming figures based on certification alone.

== Credits and personnel ==
Credits adapted from Being Funny in a Foreign Language album liner notes.

- Matthew Healy – composer, producer, guitar, vocals
- George Daniel – composer, producer, programming, drums
- Adam Hann – composer, guitar
- Ross MacDonald – bass
- Phoebe Bridgers – backing vocals
- Jack Antonoff – producer
- Robin Schmidt – mastering engineer
- Manny Marroquin – mixer

== See also ==
- The 1975 discography
- List of songs by Matty Healy
