= Yoste =

Australian singer

Kurt Sines, known professionally as Yoste, is an Australian singer based in Brisbane, Queensland, who has composed and recorded several songs, as well as a new album.

Yoste has filmed music videos and posted them on YouTube. One music video, for the song "Chihiro," got over two million views on YouTube.

== Discography ==
=== Studio albums ===
- A Place To Exist (2023)

=== Extended plays ===
- Nothing's Everything (2021)
- A Few Brief Moments (2020)
- Try To Be Okay (2019)

=== Singles ===
- Blue (2018)
- Arc (2018)

== See also ==
- Pop music
