= Happiness (The 1975 song) =

Single by the 1975

from the album Being Funny in a Foreign Language
- Released: 3 August 2022
- Genre: Dance-pop; disco; indie pop; pop
- Length: 5:04 (album version); 3:55 (Dance Floor Edit)
- Label: Dirty Hit
- Songwriters: Matthew Healy; George Daniel; DJ Sabrina the Teenage DJ
- Producers: Matthew Healy; George Daniel; Jack Antonoff

The 1975 singles chronology
"Part of the Band" (2022)	"Happiness" (2022)	"I'm in Love with You" (2022)

Music video
- "Happiness" on YouTube

"Happiness" is a song recorded by English band the 1975. It was released on 3 August 2022 as the second single from their fifth studio album, Being Funny in a Foreign Language (2022).

The song peaked at number 46 on the UK Singles Chart and 65 in Ireland.

== Composition ==
"Happiness" is a disco song. The song is performed in the key of B major with a tempo of 118 beats per minute in common time. The band's vocals span from F♯_{3} to G♯_{4} and follows a chord progression of B–G♯m7–F♯–B–G♯m7–D♯m7.

== Charts ==
Chart performance for "Happiness"
Chart (2022)	Peak position
Ireland (IRMA)	65
Japan Hot Overseas (Billboard Japan)	4
New Zealand Hot Singles (RMNZ)	29
UK Singles (OCC)	46
US Hot Rock & Alternative Songs (Billboard)	20

== Certifications ==
Certifications and sales for "Happiness"
Region	Certification	Certified units/sales
United Kingdom (BPI)	Silver	200,000^{‡}
^{‡} Sales+streaming figures based on certification alone.

== See also ==
- The 1975 discography
- List of songs by Matty Healy
