= Being Funny in a Foreign Language =

Studio album by the 1975
- Released: 14 October 2022
- Recorded: 4 January – May 2022
- Studios: Electric Lady (New York City); Real World (Box, Wiltshire)
- Genres: Pop rock; folk rock; indie pop; synthwave
- Length: 43:26
- Label: Dirty Hit
- Producers: Matthew Healy; George Daniel; Jack Antonoff

The 1975 chronology
Notes on a Conditional Form (2020)	Being Funny in a Foreign Language (2022)

Singles from Being Funny in a Foreign Language
- 1. "Part of the Band" Released: 7 July 2022; 2. "Happiness" Released: 3 August 2022; 3. "I'm in Love with You" Released: 1 September 2022; 4. "All I Need to Hear" Released: 21 September 2022; 5. "About You" Released: 23 December 2022 (radio); 6. "Oh Caroline" Released: 17 March 2023 (radio); 7. "Looking for Somebody (To Love)" Released: 16 June 2023 (radio)

Being Funny in a Foreign Language is the fifth studio album by English band the 1975. It was released on 14 October 2022 by Dirty Hit. The album was recorded primarily at Real World Studios in Wiltshire. The band released the lead single "Part of the Band" on 7 July 2022, which was followed by the subsequent singles "Happiness", "I'm in Love with You", "All I Need to Hear", "About You", "Oh Caroline", and "Looking for Somebody (To Love)".

Upon release, the album received acclaim from critics, with many reviewers naming it some of the band's strongest work. Several publications such as NME, Billboard, Pitchfork, Rolling Stone, and Variety listed it as one of the best releases of 2022. It debuted atop the UK Albums Chart as well as reaching number one in Scotland, Ireland and Australia. It also reached the top 10 in New Zealand, Japan, Canada, the Netherlands and the United States. The album was nominated for Album of the Year at the 2023 Brit Awards.

== Background ==
Many of the band's 2020 shows that were postponed due to the COVID-19 pandemic were ultimately cancelled on 12 January 2021. During this time, lead singer Matty Healy teased future music under their previous name "Drive Like I Do", and said that the band was working on their fifth studio album. However, there was no indication as to when writing, recording, or mixing would be finished.

On 14 February 2022, the band deactivated their main social media accounts, hinting at new material.

The album title and track listing were revealed to select fans through postcards. The band released its first single from the album "Part of the Band" on 7 July 2022. The second single, "Happiness", was released on 3 August 2022. The third single, "I'm in Love with You", was released on 1 September 2022. The fourth single, "All I Need to Hear", was released on 21 September 2022.

== Recording and production ==
"Every record I've made, I convinced myself that I had so much to prove, so it had to be about everything that ever happened, everything that's happening now, and everything that could ever happen. But on this record, I said, 'Instead of a magnum opus, what about more like a polaroid?"

— Matty Healy, on Being Funny in a Foreign Language

Writing sessions for what would eventually become Being Funny in a Foreign Language started in 2021, when the band worked on-and-off with producer BJ Burton, whom Healy admired for his production work on Bon Iver's 22, A Million (2016) and Low's Double Negative (2018) and Hey What (2021). During their time together, Burton noticed that his creative process varied greatly from the band's, as they would "[pull] up songs from Spotify, or [check] another reference for a chord progression" while writing. He set out to align their differences, and eventually they did record what amounted to be "sparks where songs were being bred ... a bunch of early demos", but after Burton heard that the band began working with producer Jack Antonoff, he ended the sessions. In an August 2022 interview with Pitchfork, Burton indicated that the band's creative pivot still "stung", though Healy indicated he was hoping to rekindle his working relationship with Burton for a future album.

When recording with Antonoff, the band was determined to focus on their instrumental strong-suits and keep things as live and unadulterated by computers as possible. In an interview with Apple Music 1, Healy amounted the process to outright defining the true sonic identity of the band, while host Zane Lowe described it as the next step for a band with "such restless energy" as the 1975. Lowe cited that the band had "exhausted" their stylistic exploration and had reached a point of reflection on their improved technical skill in this record. Similarly to Burton, Healy sought out to work with Antonoff, whom he called the "biggest producer in the world" out of respect for his production capabilities, specifically his work with American singer-songwriter Lana Del Rey. However, Healy made it clear to Antonoff that he retained full creative control of the recording process while working together. While writing for the album, Healy would revisit and spend time in the band's native Manchester to finalise lyrics.

== Promotion ==
To support the album, the band embarked on a world tour titled At Their Very Best in 2022. This was followed by an arenas tour titled Still... At Their Very Best the following year.

== Critical reception ==
Professional ratings
Aggregate scores
Source	Rating
AnyDecentMusic?	7.6/10
Metacritic	82/100
Review scores
Source	Rating
AllMusic	4/5 stars
Clash	8/10
Dork	5/5 stars
Evening Standard	4/5 stars
Gigwise	10/10
i	4/5 stars
NME	4/5 stars
Pitchfork	8.0/10
The Skinny	5/5 stars

Being Funny in a Foreign Language received critical acclaim upon its release. At Metacritic, which assigns a normalised rating out of 100 based on reviews from mainstream critics, the album received a score of 82 out of 100, based on reviews from 16 critics, indicating "universal acclaim". The album was rated an 7.6 out of 10 on the aggregator AnyDecentMusic?.

Brady Brickner-Wood of Pitchfork wrote that the album "tames the group's taste for excess and plays up their fundamentals: goopy '80s guitars, pumping drums, schmaltzy saxophones, and infuriatingly good hooks" and praised the band's experimentation, noting that "even when their songs reek of camp, Healy has enough moxie to elevate a potentially horrible idea into an eloquent exclamation point". El Hunt, writing for NME, noted how the band "tightened things up" on Being Funny in a Foreign Language, calling Healy's songwriting on the album "his most contradictory and intriguing yet, frequently turning his pen back on himself", concluding that the record "feels like the right next step after pushing experimental excess to its logical conclusion, and is comparatively lean with just eleven tracks to its name. 'The 1975: At Their Very Best' – the lofty, and slightly tongue-in-cheek title they've given to their upcoming tour – might be infuriatingly, brilliantly cocky, but let's face facts: it's also pretty accurate."

=== Year-end lists ===
Select year-end rankings of Being Funny in a Foreign Language
Publication	List	Rank	Ref.
Billboard	The 50 Best Albums of 2022	16	
Clash	Clash's Albums of the Year	48	
DIY	DIY's Albums of 2022	8	
Entertainment Weekly	The 10 Best Albums of 2022	10	
Esquire	The 25 Best Albums of 2022	*	
Far Out	The 50 Best Albums of 2022	46	
Gigwise	Gigwise's 51 Best Albums of 2022	3	
Insider	The 20 Best Albums of 2022	11	
The Guardian	The 50 Best Albums of 2022	26	
Los Angeles Times	The 20 best albums of 2022	*	
New York Times	Best Albums of 2022	*	
NME	The 50 Best Albums of 2022	10	
Pitchfork	The 50 Best Albums of 2022	33	
Rolling Stone	Best Music of 2022	*	
Slant Magazine	The 50 Best Albums of 2022	37	
Slate	The Best Albums of 2022	*	
Stereogum	The 50 Best Albums of 2022	17	
Under the Radar	The 100 Best Albums of 2022	21	
Uproxx	Best Albums of 2022	13	
Variety	The Best Albums of 2022	9	

== Track listing ==
All tracks are written by Matthew Healy and George Daniel. Co-writers noted below.

Being Funny in a Foreign Language track listing
No.	Title	Writer(s)	Length
1.	"The 1975"	BJ Burton; Tommy King	4:10
2.	"Happiness"	DJ Sabrina the Teenage DJ	5:03
3.	"Looking for Somebody (To Love)"	Ilsey Juber; Jamie Squire	2:58
4.	"Part of the Band"	Squire	4:20
5.	"Oh Caroline"	Juber; Squire; Benjamin Francis Leftwich; Jimmy Hogarth	3:32
6.	"I'm in Love with You"	Adam Hann	4:22
7.	"All I Need to Hear"	Squire	3:30
8.	"Wintering"	Jacob Bugden	2:45
9.	"Human Too"	Squire; Leftwich; Hogarth	3:44
10.	"About You"		5:26
11.	"When We Are Together"	Rob Milton	3:36
Total length:			43:26

Japanese Version
No.	Title	Writer(s)	Length
12.	"All I Need to Hear" (Demo)	Squire	2:54
Total length:			46:20

=== Note ===
- "Human Too" was removed from streaming services on 4 November 2025, with Healy saying that the change was made "so the album is more how [he wants] it to be".

== Personnel ==
Credits adapted from the album's liner notes.

=== The 1975 ===
- Matthew Healy – vocals, guitar, drums, piano, Clavinet, percussion, string arrangements, production, creative direction
- George Daniel – drums, programming, keyboards, synthesizers, backing vocals, piano, percussion, string arrangements, production
- Adam Hann – guitar, programming, backing vocals, keyboards
- Ross MacDonald – bass, double bass, keyboards, backing vocals

=== Additional musicians ===
- Jack Antonoff – programming, guitar, piano, drums, backing vocals, violin, keyboards, synthesizers, string arrangements
- Tommy King – keyboards, synthesizers
- BJ Burton – programming, synthesizers
- Sabrina the Teenage DJ – programming
- Jamie Squire – backing vocals, piano, Wurlitzer, Clavinet, synthesizers, organ, acoustic guitar
- John Waugh – saxophone
- Evan Smith – brass
- Bobby Hawk – strings, string arrangements
- Warren Ellis – strings, string arrangements
- Michelle Zauner – backing vocals
- Oli Jacobs – Wurlitzer
- Carly Holt – additional vocals
- Zem Audu – saxophone
- Ben Hudson – additional programming (track 10)

=== Technical ===
- Jack Antonoff – production
- BJ Burton – additional production (tracks 1, 5)
- Laura Sisk – engineering
- Oli Jacobs – engineering
- Dom Shaw – engineering assistance
- Katie May – engineering assistance
- Freddy Williams – engineering assistance
- John Rooney – engineering assistance
- Dani Perez Carasols – engineering assistance
- Liam Hebb – engineering assistance
- Evan Smith – additional engineering
- Jon Gautier – additional engineering
- Andrew Gearhart – additional engineering
- Dave Gross – additional engineering
- Manny Marroquin – mixing
- Chris Galland – mix engineering
- Robin Florent – mixing assistance (1)
- Scott Desmarais – mixing assistance (1)
- Jeremie Inhaber – mixing assistance (1)
- Robin Schmidt – mastering

=== Visuals ===
- Samuel Burgess-Johnson – artwork, creative direction
- Samuel Bradley – photography
- Patricia Villirillo – creative direction
- Ed Blow – creative direction

== Charts ==
=== Weekly charts ===
Weekly chart performance for Being Funny in a Foreign Language
Chart (2022)	Peak position
Australian Albums (ARIA)	1
Austrian Albums (Ö3 Austria)	25
Belgian Albums (Ultratop Flanders)	19
Belgian Albums (Ultratop Wallonia)	100
Canadian Albums (Billboard)	10
Danish Albums (Hitlisten)	36
Dutch Albums (Album Top 100)	9
French Albums (SNEP)	170
German Albums (Offizielle Top 100)	53
Irish Albums (Official Charts)	1
Japanese Albums (Oricon)	12
Japanese Combined Albums (Oricon)	12
Japanese Hot Albums (Billboard Japan)	10
Lithuanian Albums (AGATA)	40
New Zealand Albums (RMNZ)	4
Norwegian Albums (VG-lista)	29
Scottish Albums (Official Charts)	1
Spanish Albums (Promusicae)	30
Swedish Albums (Sverigetopplistan)	17
Swiss Albums (Schweizer Hitparade)	16
UK Albums (Official Charts)	1
UK Independent Albums (Official Charts)	1
US Billboard 200	7
US Independent Albums (Billboard)	2
US Top Alternative Albums (Billboard)	2
US Top Rock Albums (Billboard)	2

=== Year-end charts ===
Year-end chart performance for Being Funny in a Foreign Language
Chart (2022)	Position
UK Albums (OCC)	77

== Certifications ==
Certifications for Being Funny in a Foreign Language
Region	Certification	Certified units/sales
New Zealand (RMNZ)	Gold	7,500^{‡}
United Kingdom (BPI)	Gold	100,000^{‡}
^{‡} Sales+streaming figures based on certification alone.

== See also ==
- At Their Very Best
- Still... At Their Very Best
- The 1975 discography
- List of songs by Matty Healy
