= Oh Caroline =

2023 single by the 1975

Single by the 1975

from the album Being Funny in a Foreign Language
- Released: 17 March 2023
- Genre: Synth-pop; new wave; pop-funk
- Length: 3:32
- Label: Dirty Hit; Polydor
- Songwriters: Matthew Healy; George Daniel; Ilsey Juber; Jamie Squire; Benjamin Francis Leftwich; Jimmy Hogarth
- Producers: Matthew Healy; George Daniel; Jack Antonoff

The 1975 singles chronology
"About You" (2022)	"Oh Caroline" (2023)	"Looking for Somebody (To Love)" (2023)

Music video
- "Oh Caroline" on YouTube

"Oh Caroline" is a song by English band The 1975 from their fifth studio album, Being Funny in a Foreign Language (2022). The song was released on 17 March 2023 through Dirty Hit and Polydor Records as the sixth single from the album. It was written by band members Matthew Healy and George Daniel alongside Ilsey Juber, Jamie Squire, Benjamin Francis Leftwich and Jimmy Hogarth. Production of the song was handled by Healy, Daniel and Jack Antonoff.

After the single released, the song would peak at number 29 on the UK singles chart, number 41 on the Irish Singles Chart, number 4 on the NZ Hot Singles Chart, and number 30 on the Billboard Hot Rock & Alternative Songs chart in the United States. The song was also certified Silver by the British Phonographic Industry (BPI), being The 1975's most recent certifying single as of 2025. The single is also the most recent single from the band to hit the UK singles chart, the Irish Singles chart, and the Hot Rock & Alternative Songs chart as of 2025.

== Background and development ==
"Oh Caroline" was officially released by Dirty Hit and Polydor Records as the sixth single from The 1975's fifth studio album, Being Funny in a Foreign Language, added to BBC Radio 1's C List on the 17th of March, 2023. The song was the first single from the band to be released in 2023, and was one of two singles from the group to be released that year, the second being the final single from the album, "Looking for Somebody (To Love)", released on the 16th of June.

== Music and lyrics ==
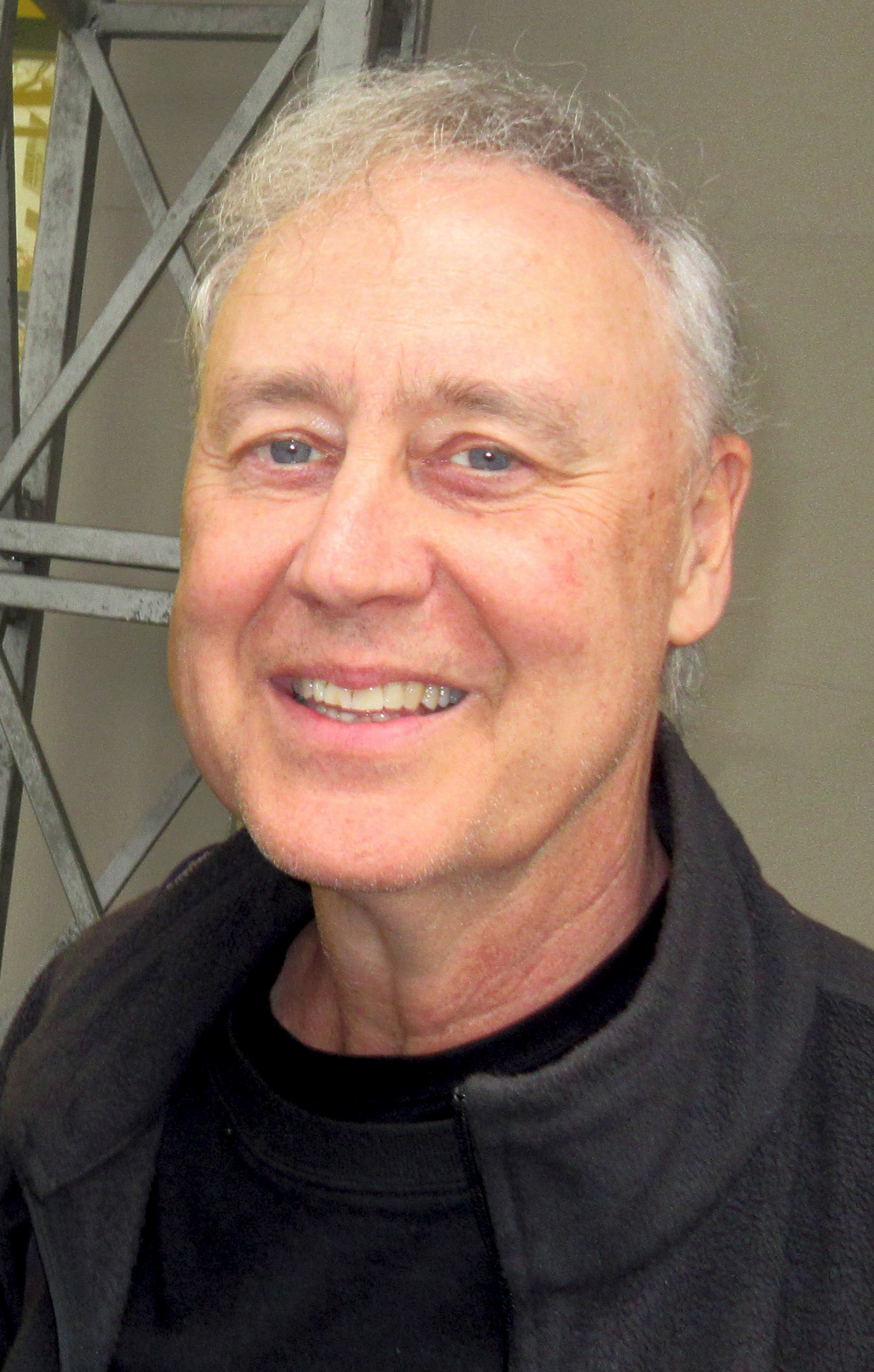
The song's was compared to the style of Bruce Hornsby (pictured) by Brady Brickner-Wood of Pitchfork and Evan Sawdey of PopMatters.

A 1980s-style pop song, "Oh Caroline" has a length of three minutes and thirty-two seconds (3:32). The track was written by band members Matthew Healy and George Daniel alongside Ilsey Juber, Jamie Squire, Benjamin Francis Leftwich and Jimmy Hogarth, while the former two handled the production in collaboration with Jack Antonoff. According to sheet music published at Musicnotes.com by Hal Leonard Music Publishing, "Oh Caroline" is set in the time signature of common time with a moderate tempo of 96 beats per minute. The song is composed in the key of D major, with Healy's vocals ranging between the notes of A_{4} and B_{5}. It follows a chord progression of Gsus_{2}–Bm–A–D–A. "Oh Caroline" incorporates elements of funk, new wave and yacht rock into its "glistening" production, composed of a "dance-worthy" tempo, "pristine" electric pianos, gated drums, a dance groove, synths and "twinkling" ambience.

Thematically, "Oh Caroline" is a love song that deals with hopelessness, unrequited devotion and suicide. In the lyrics, Healy is pushed to the point of suicidal ideation, singing: "I'll try anything that you want to / I'll 'find myself in the moonlight' / 'Cause baby I want everything that you want / And I've tried to 'just be me' like a thousand times". However, the singer seeks to make amends, singing: "Oh Caroline, I wanna get it right this time / 'Cause you're always on my mind".

Michael Cragg of The Guardian found the song's intro to be similar to the work of the Backstreet Boys. Evening Standard writer David Smyth said there is a "light Miami Vice funkiness" to the song. Brady Brickner-Wood of Pitchfork said the song blends Carly Rae Jepsen and Bruce Hornsby. Evan Sawdey of PopMatters also echoed Brickner-Wood's Hornsby comparison. Matt Collar of AllMusic said the song blends influences of Fleetwood Mac with the dance-oriented post-punk of the band's self-titled debut album (2013). Steve Erickson of Slant Magazine called the song "a lost adult-pop hit from 1985". Paolo Ragusa of Consequence compared the song to the works of Toto and Peter Gabriel. Alex Swhear of Variety noted dark undercurrents within the song's lyrics and said it "may be the first love song of note to bemoan 'getting cucked'". Mitch Mosk of Atwood Magazine wrote that the song contains a "no-holds-barred openness and directness" in its lyrics.

== Critical reception ==
The song placed 24th on the Los Angeles Times' best songs of 2022 list, with the editorial staff saying: "Imagine Lloyd Dobler hoisting that boombox outside Diane Court’s window and blasting 'The Way It Is' instead of “In Your Eyes.'" In a ranking of the band's best songs, Molly Marsh of Gigwise listed the song at number 43; the writer commended Healy's vocal performance and compared the song to Lionel Richie's "All Night Long (All Night)" (1983). Ranking the song at number 47 in a list of the band's greatest songs for NME, Rhian Daly lauded the "gigantic" chorus and "rasped, urgent" bridge, deeming it a "big, bold pop song that feels both classic and completely fresh". Mark Kennedy of the Associated Press said the song sounded similar to a theme song from a late-1970s romantic comedy television show.

Ben Salmon of Paste observed similarities between the song and the musical style of the band's I Like It When You Sleep, for You Are So Beautiful yet So Unaware of It (2016). Philip Giouras of Gigwise gave the song a favourable review and deemed it "without a doubt as perfect as pop can be"; praising the "intelligent" groove and "anthemic" chorus, Giouras wrote that Healy "manages to find that sweet spot of yearning emotion in his tone and delivery". Stephen Ackroyd of Dork called the song a career highlight for the band and also made a comparison between the song and "All Night Long", saying The 1975 took Richie's track and "twisted and turned [it] into a track that draws together all strands and blends them together in perfect harmony".

Brickner-Wood commended the song's timeless, retro sound and said: "It’s fun, it’s funny, it’s magnificent in its breadth—it makes you believe, however reservedly, that you, too, can 'find [yourself] in the moonlight.'" Collar deemed the song an album highlight. Deeming it among the most "stunning" and "deeply affective" songs on the album, Sawdey gave praise to the lyrics for "articulating the weirder corners of the human experience". Swhear called the song an audacious and unanticipated detour from the parent album. Mosk called the song an album highlight and wrote that it is an "inspiring, all-consuming celebratory" standout. Chris DeVille of Stereogum called it a "howl-along" and praised the production and lyrics.

Joshua Williams of Buzz Magazine also drew comparisons to the work of Richie. Eli Ordonez of NME deemed the "nostalgic" song an album highlight, saying that the lyrics "demonstrate an exceptional amount of sincerity, an earnest tribute to unrequited love". In a mixed review, Claire Biddles of The Line of Best Fit said the song shares the "Californian sunset mood" of the band's "She's American" (2016) but lacks that song's imagination and specificity, while also deriding the lyrics as lazy. The editorial staff of The Irish Times were similarly ambivalent, saying the band "have merely gussied up their usual formula and are now presenting it with added affectations". Brady Gerber of Spin called the song lean and light, which he felt made it enjoyable at face value, he bemoaned the song for sounding akin to a One Direction song about suicide, ultimately deeming it a "cringeworthy execution and a pale comparison" to The 1975's "subversive" cover of One Direction's "What Makes You Beautiful" (2011).

== Charts ==
Chart performance for "Oh Caroline"
Chart (2022)	Peak position
Ireland (IRMA)	41
New Zealand Hot Singles (RMNZ)	4
UK Singles (Official Charts)	29
US Hot Rock & Alternative Songs (Billboard)	30

== Certifications ==
Certifications for "Oh Caroline"
Region	Certification	Certified units/sales
United Kingdom (BPI)	Silver	200,000^{‡}
^{‡} Sales+streaming figures based on certification alone.

== See also ==
- The 1975 discography
- List of songs by Matty Healy
