= Looking for Somebody (To Love) =

Single by the 1975

from the album Being Funny in a Foreign Language
- Released: 16 June 2023
- Genre: New wave
- Length: 2:58
- Label: Dirty Hit; Polydor Records
- Songwriters: Matthew Healy; George Daniel; Ilsey Juber; Jamie Squire
- Producers: Matthew Healy; George Daniel; Jack Antonoff

The 1975 singles chronology
"Oh Caroline" (2023)	"Looking for Somebody (To Love)" (2023)	"Now Is the Hour" (2024)

"Looking for Somebody (To Love)" is a song by English band the 1975 from their fifth studio album, Being Funny in a Foreign Language (2022). The song was released on 16 June 2023 through Dirty Hit and Polydor Records as the seventh and final single from the album. It was written by band members Matthew Healy and George Daniel alongside Ilsey Juber and Jamie Squire. Production of the song was handled by Healy, Daniel and Jack Antonoff.

The song peaked at number 95 on the UK Streaming Chart and number 10 on the NZ Hot Singles Chart.

== Charts ==
Chart performance for "Looking for Somebody (To Love)"
Chart (2022)	Peak position
New Zealand Hot Singles (RMNZ)	10
UK Audio Streaming (OCC)	95
UK Indie (OCC)	9

== See also ==
- The 1975 discography
- List of songs by Matty Healy
