= Part of the Band =

2022 single by The 1975

Single by the 1975

from the album Being Funny in a Foreign Language
- Released: 7 July 2022
- Recorded: 2021–2022
- Genre: Folk rock; indie folk; art pop
- Length: 4:20
- Label: Dirty Hit
- Songwriters: Matthew Healy; George Daniel; Jamie Squire
- Producers: Matthew Healy; George Daniel; Jack Antonoff

The 1975 singles chronology
"Spinning" (2021)	"Part of the Band" (2022)	"Happiness" (2022)

Music video
- "Part of the Band" on YouTube

"Part of the Band" is a song by English band the 1975. It was released on the 7th of July, 2022 through Dirty Hit as the lead single of their fifth album, Being Funny in a Foreign Language. Reviewers identified the song as breaking new ground for the band, containing aspects of different pop, folk and rock genres. String instruments play throughout the acoustic song, with additional incorporation of woodwind and jazz instruments. The lyrics, in a stream of consciousness style, explore Healy's relationships and himself without a chorus.

The song, when released, peaked at number 57 on the UK singles chart. The song also peaked at number 70 on the Irish Singles Chart, number 6 on the Billboard Japan Hot Overseas chart, number 14 on the NZ Hot Singles chart, and number 29 on the Billboard Hot Rock & Alternative Songs chart in the United States. It was not only the first single from the album, but also the band's first single in 2022.

== Background and recording ==
"Part of the Band" arose from the song "New York" that Matty Healy performed in 2021 as a support act for Phoebe Bridgers. "New York", written by Benjamin Francis Leftwich, lacked a bridge, so Healy wrote one; it developed into a separate song. The single is a collaboration with Jack Antonoff, co-producer, and Michelle Zauner of Japanese Breakfast, a contributing vocalist.

== Composition ==
Andrew Sacher of BrooklynVegan described the song as art pop. In Pitchfork, Sam Sodomsky wrote that the song was "serene folk-rock", with a "light and buoyant" instrumental that evoked Vampire Weekend. Multiple reviewers found it to evoke the style of indie folk artists Bon Iver. Stephen Ackroyd of Dork characterised it as lo-fi music, a genre that the 1975's previous album Notes on a Conditional Form had incorporated, and saw aspects of indie music similar to Phoebe Bridgers. Ali Shutler of NME identified aspects of Midwest emo as in "Jesus Christ 2005 God Bless America" and "dreamy" synthesiser effects as in "The Birthday Party". Stereogum's Chris DeVille also compared it to "The Birthday Party" due to its "floaty, dreamy" tone, and labelled it sophisti-pop. However, Ackroyd found that the song ultimately left "genre confined to the scrap heap".

The song is acoustic. Instrumentals—wrote Sodomsky—include "percussive strings" and "lush acoustics", while the melody is "bittersweet". The layered instrumentals create the effect of "false stops and starts", with "flashes of woodwinds and horns, swirls of digital effects and spoken overdubs that sound like accidents". The song opens with, according to Ackroyd, "string stabs that feel both warm and darkly anxious at the same time". This string music, a motif throughout the song, yields at points to "soft, floksy indie rock", according to DeVille. The instrumentals incorporate saxophone; Ackroyd compared the "wild, organic jazz soundscapes" to Black Country, New Road. Robin Murray of Clash described the song as "baroque in its arrangement" and "floral in its tone".

Lyrically, Shutler described the song as an "intense tangled stream-of-consciousness", as Healy reflects on his past relationships and then on himself and his "role as an outspoken, political mouthpiece for a generation". The lyrics were described by Ackroyd as "a winding, fast-running train of thoughts, memories and ideas", including reference to in-jokes among fans. Murray said that the lyrics incorporate both sincere and surreal elements. The song has no chorus. DeVille compared Healy's singing style to a soft rock musician, though at one point he imitates Elvis Presley.

The song is written in the key of F♯ major with a tempo of 142 beats per minute in common time. The vocals span two octaves, from G♯_{2} to G♯_{4}, in the song.

== Release ==
"Part of the Band" was released as the lead single of Being Funny in a Foreign Language on 7 July 2022. The 1975 continued their tradition of deactivating their social media accounts before the release of new music on 14 February 2022. Prior to release, billboards teased lyrics to the song; Healy posted lyrics and a snippet of the song on Instagram. According to a tracklist released by the band on 29 June 2022, "Part of the Band" will be fourth of 11 songs on their fifth album, Being Funny in a Foreign Language. The album is scheduled for release on 14 October 2022.

== Critical reception ==
Shutler rated it four out of five stars. He commented that the band "continue to reinvent themselves and carve their own path forward" and enjoyed the "giddy freedom" of the song's "gut-led recklessness".

Ackroyd saw the song as "a thrust towards new horizons", continuing the 1975's "lack of defined expectation". He praised that the band were "at their most organic" and called it "either brave or stupid" as a "comeback track".

DeVille concurred that the single was "not quite like any 1975 song to date". He reviewed of the lyrics that "Healy weaves his more outlandish words into the music so smoothly that you might not even notice how many buttons he's pushing".

Sodomsky found it more minimalistic than Notes on a Conditional Form. He reviewed that the lyrics are more "dense" and "neurotically quotable" than any song by the band, and that the "grand, playful" nature was something "that only this band could pull off", serving as "a reminder that nonchalance can also be a meticulous performance".

Murray reviewed the song as "remarkably subtle", finding it "one of their most straight-forward, heart-on-sleeve" songs and praising Healy as "never a writer to dull his pen".

Year-end rankings of "Part of the Band"
Publication	List	Rank	Ref.
NPR	The 100 Best Songs of 2022	80	
NME	The 50 Best Songs of 2022	29	
Pitchfork	The 100 Best Songs of 2022	13	
Rolling Stone	The 100 Best Songs of 2022	79	
Time	The Best Songs of 2022	3	
Vulture	The Best Songs of 2022	Honorable Mention	

== Charts ==
Chart performance for "Part of the Band"
Chart (2022)	Peak position
Ireland (IRMA)	70
Japan Hot Overseas (Billboard Japan)	6
New Zealand Hot Singles (RMNZ)	14
UK Singles (OCC)	57
UK Indie (OCC)	1
US Hot Rock & Alternative Songs (Billboard)	29
US Rock & Alternative Airplay (Billboard)	22

== See also ==
- The 1975 discography
- List of songs by Matty Healy
