= Be My Mistake =

2018 song by The 1975

Song by the 1975

from the album A Brief Inquiry into Online Relationships
- Released: 30 November 2018
- Genre: Acoustic rock; folk pop
- Length: 4:17
- Label: Dirty Hit; Polydor
- Songwriter(s): Matthew Healy; George Daniel; Adam Hann; Ross MacDonald
- Producer(s): Matthew Healy; George Daniel

"Be My Mistake" is a song by British indie rock band, the 1975. The track is the sixth song on their third studio album, A Brief Inquiry into Online Relationships. Despite not being an official single from the album, it charted on the New Zealand and U.S. rock charts.

== Background ==
In a November 2018 interview with Pitchfork, lead singer Matty Healy described "Be My Mistake" as a song about guilt. Healy further explained "It’s about when you are a young person and you struggle sometimes to figure out what you really want. And sometimes, like a lot of things, it requires you to make a mistake before you actually understand what you have." Healy described Nick Drake as an influence for the song.

== Critical reception ==
Writing for PopBuzz, Katie Louise Smith called "Be My Mistake" "is almost like an even sadder sequel to 'Somebody Else' and it will one hundred percent destroy you emotionally".

== Charts ==
Chart (2018–19)	Peak position
New Zealand (Recorded Music NZ)	24
US Hot Rock & Alternative Songs (Billboard)	36

== Certifications ==
Certifications and sales for "Be My Mistake"
Region	Certification	Certified units/sales
Brazil (Pro-Música Brasil)	Gold	20,000^{‡}
United Kingdom (BPI)	Silver	200,000^{‡}
^{‡} Sales+streaming figures based on certification alone.

== See also ==
- The 1975 discography
- List of songs by Matty Healy
