= Parks and open spaces in Oslo =

Parks in the capital of Norway

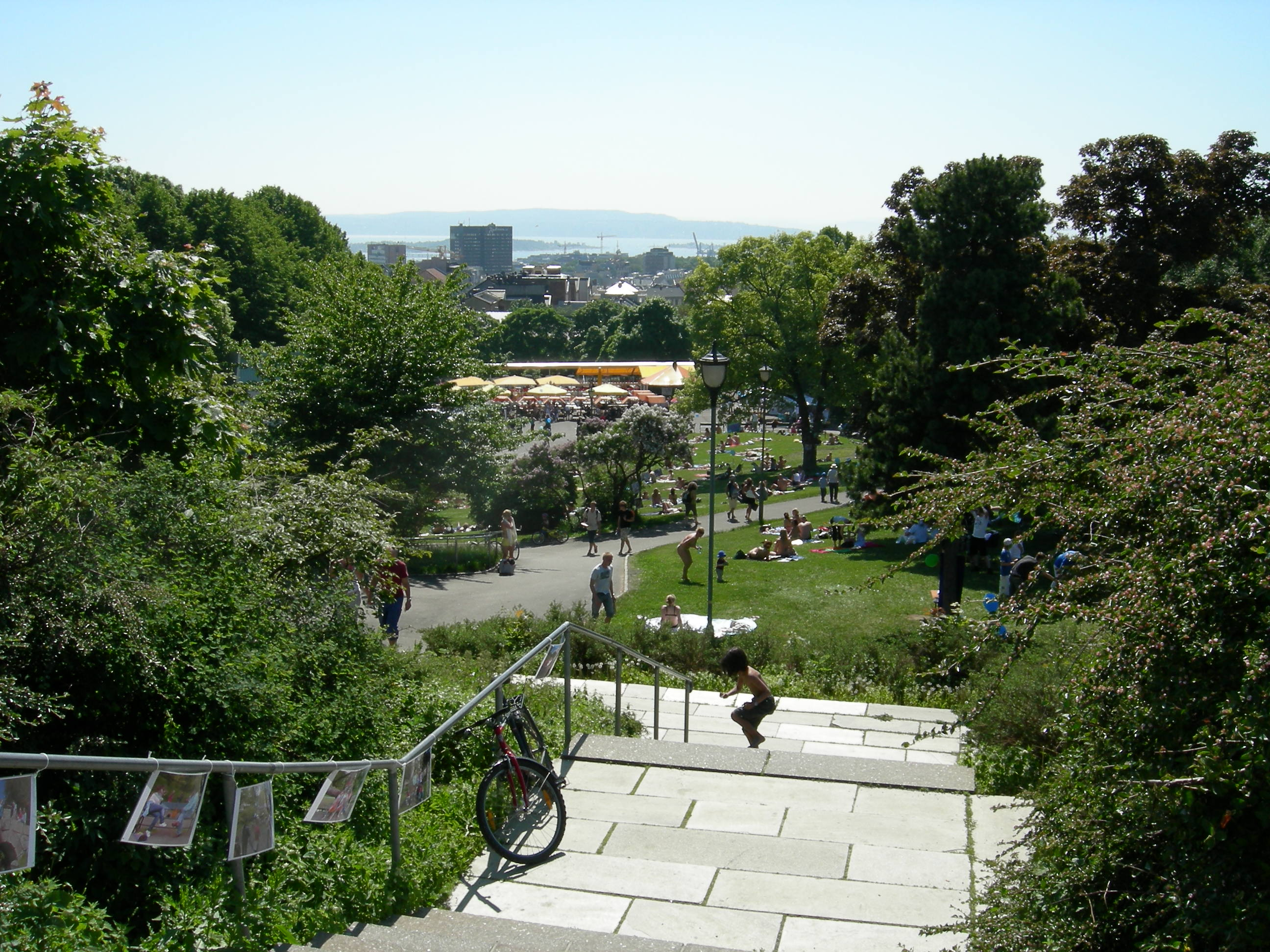
A view towards the Oslofjord from the St. Hanshaugen Park in Oslo

Parks and open spaces are an integral part of the landscape of Oslo, the capital and largest city of Norway. The various parks and open spaces are interconnected by paths so that the city's inhabitants can walk between them.

As the city expanded in the middle of the 19th century, areas were appropriated for parks and recreational purposes. The eastern part of the city (Østkanten) was prioritized due to congestion and industrialization. The residential and more affluent western parts of the city (Majorstuen, Frogner) have comparably fewer parks and open spaces. 95% of the city's inhabitants have a park or an open green space within 300 meters of their home.

Some of the parks have a special place in the life and history of Oslo:

- Frogner Park with the Vigeland installation, Norway's most visited tourist attraction.
- Eidsvolls plass and Studenterlunden along the main street Karl Johans gate.
- Slottsparken, which surrounds the Royal Palace.
- St. Hanshaugen, the first large public park outside the city center.
- Birkelunden and Olaf Ryes plass in Grünerløkka.
- Akerselva environment park, with walks around structures from early stages of Norwegian industrial development.
- Bygdøy and Ekebergsletta, large natural parks.

== Landscape and parks ==
The central part of Oslo is situated between hills; Holmenkollen, Voksenkollen, Vettakollen and Grefsenåsen north of the city and Haukåsen to the east, all of them with a height of 350–500 metres. The Ekeberg hill is located to the southeast, with a height of 150 metres. On the slopes from the hills north of the city Holmenkollåsen, Grefsenkollen and Korsvollparken are the areas that provide the best view of the city.

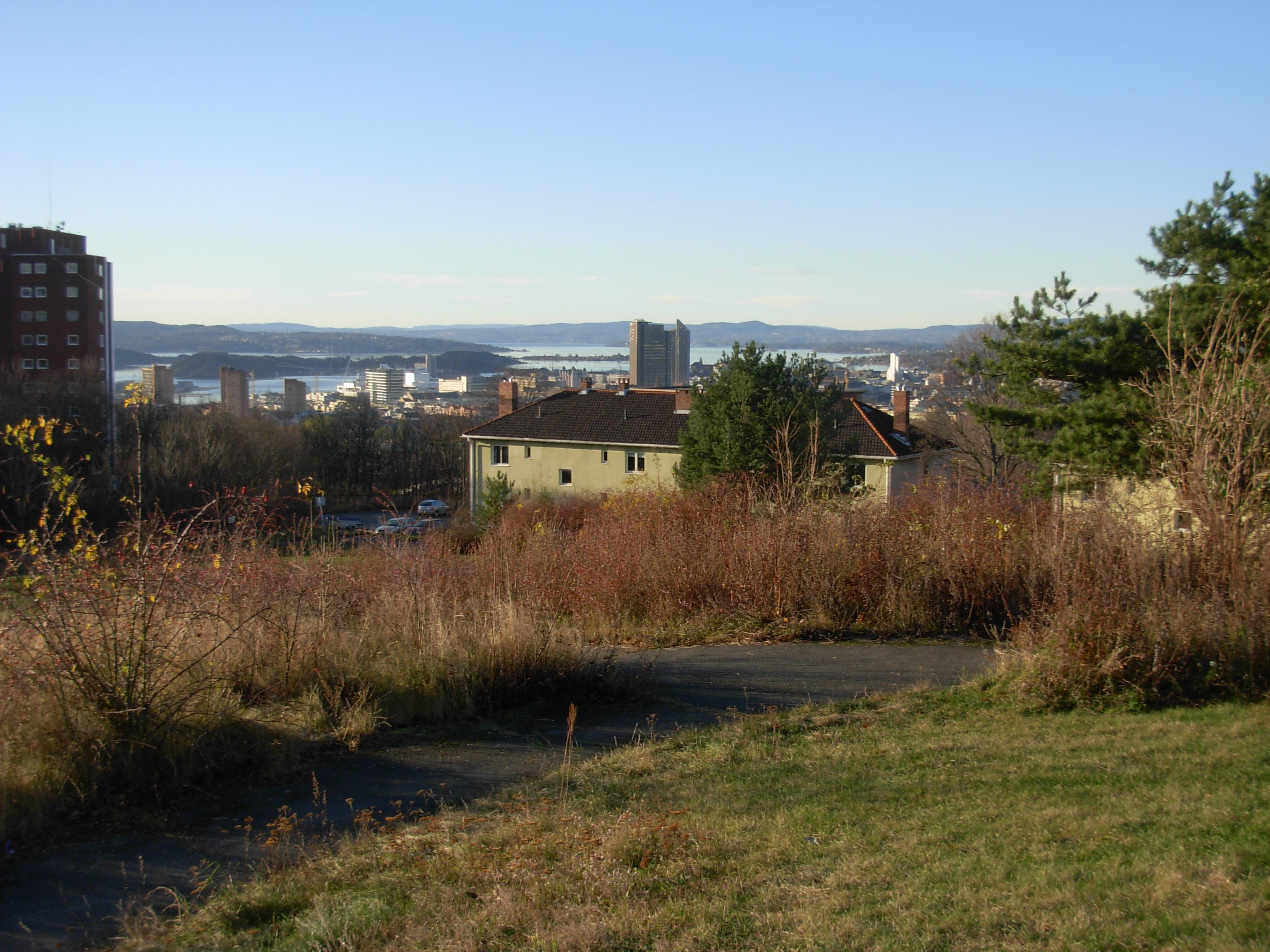
View from Hasleparken

The slopes at Ekeberg have the best view over the central city area. The part of the Ekeberg hill that faces the fjord has woods with paths and views towards the fjord. The viewpoints around the city have several parks; Blåsen in Stensparken, St. Hanshaugen, the hills Ola Narr - Tøyenparken - Kampen park are all three with an elevation about 80–90 metres above sea level. Hasleparken behind Tøyenparken is somewhat higher. On the Aker ridge (from Akersneset with the castle along the Akersgata to St. Hanshaugen) is also Kontraskjæret and Egebergløkka used as parks, with views over Pipervika and the eastern part of the inner city. Torshovparken and Myraløkka on Sagene have views towards the center of the city and the fjord.

Akerselva and its surroundings have in the last hundred years been landscaped in a matter that preserves both the river and its industrial history. The task of developing the other rivers within the city as parks has started. The work with the river Alna has been concluded with an environment park while Lysakerelva, Frognerelva, Hovinbekken and Ljanselva are still under development.

Oslo has a long shoreline that has been used by shipyards and ports for the last 150 years. In the west, on the border to Bærum, the Vækerøparken is situated along the shoreside. Beaches with parks are Huk on Bygdøy, Katten and Hvervenbukta and areas on Malmøya and Ulvøya. The "Fjordby" plan allocates more access to the shoreline for the city's population.

Among the islands within the city border Hovedøya, Gressholmen and Langøyene are easily accessible by ferries and have extensive parks and beaches. In Gamlebyen, the water level in Middelalderparken gives a view of the shoreline in medieval ages.

== Early parks in Oslo ==
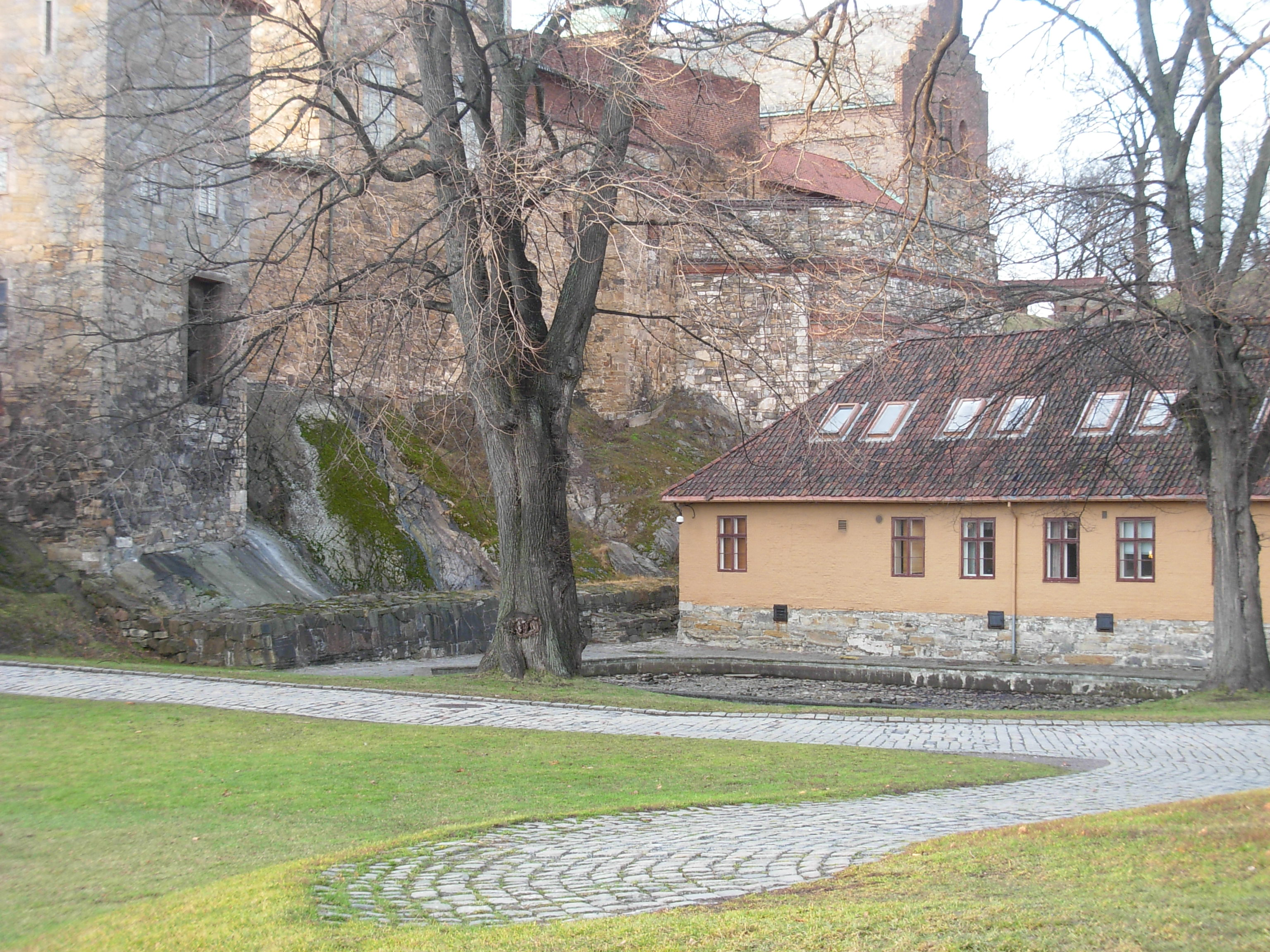
The area where the garden at the Akershus castle was situated

In the Late Medieval Age, there was a garden north of the Olav's monastery (currently the bishop's residence), where vegetables were grown. The garden also had a fish pond. Aside from that information, little is known about gardens in medieval Oslo. It is nonetheless most possible that the monastery at Hovedøya had a garden, created by the English monks who lived there. The garden at the castle Akershus is the earliest depicted garden in Norway, possibly created around 1560. The garden had neatly arranged beds, a pavilion and a fish pond called Munkedammen after the feudal overlord Christen Munk. The garden was cleared by the end of the 17th century, and the pond was filled in around the 1860s, though it was reopened in 1965. In the 1770s, the Kanonparken was created by the commandant. It was open and constructed in public, though it was not primarily intended for use by the civil population.

Paléhaven became the first publicly available park when the owner Christian Ancher opened it in the 1760s. It was Norway's only city park in Baroque style and was situated by the shoreline. The only thing left of it today is an alley of linden trees on Christian Frederiks plass ("Plata"). Multiple enclosures around the early city had gardens, mostly for growing vegetables, from the 18th century also as parks. Ponds were created for fish. The only one of these enclosures unsullied is the closure Rolighed at Professor Dahls gate 32.

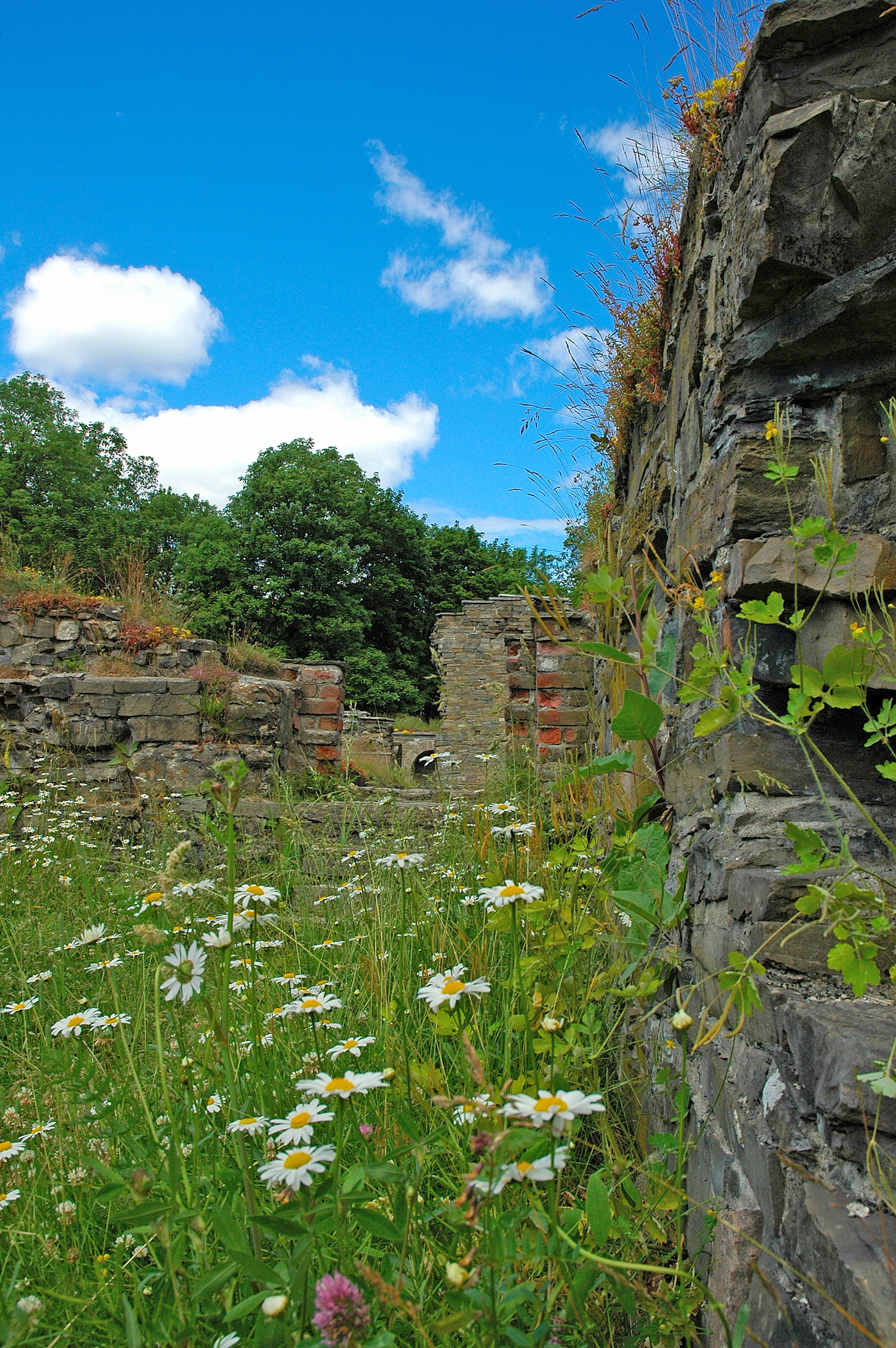
From the Cistercian monastery on Hovedøya

The garden on Marseli's enclosure (Marselienborg) is the current Eidsvolls plass, where German and Dutch gardeners around 1600 created what became the finest garden in the city. Around 1840 a public park was established on Eidsvolls plass. The area south of Eidsvolls plass was later developed. The nearby garden on Ruseløkken, the current Studenterlunden, was a Renaissance garden at that time.

The garden around Munkedammen in Pipervika was around 1750 one of the first semi-public gardens where the upper class of Christiania went for walks, but it decayed after 1790. The pond was about 50 meters wide and 100 meters long and was a continuation of two earlier, separate ponds one assumed that the monks from the Hovedøya monastery had created. In the pond there was a small island with a pavilion and a herb garden.

North of Stortorget and Grensen several parks were created around 1700, among them James Collet's Grensehaven between Akersgata and Grubbegata, in Renaissance style. The garden at Oslo Ladegård had hedges, paths in a square system, a long pond, and alleys down to the fjord, in Renaissance style. A small part of Ladegårdshagen was recreated in 1999.

Grünerhagen, created by the Grüner family on Nedre Foss was around 1700 a grandiose garden with terraces, alleys, a pond with a garden pavilion on piles and a zoo with various animals. The garden was destroyed by the end of the 19th century.

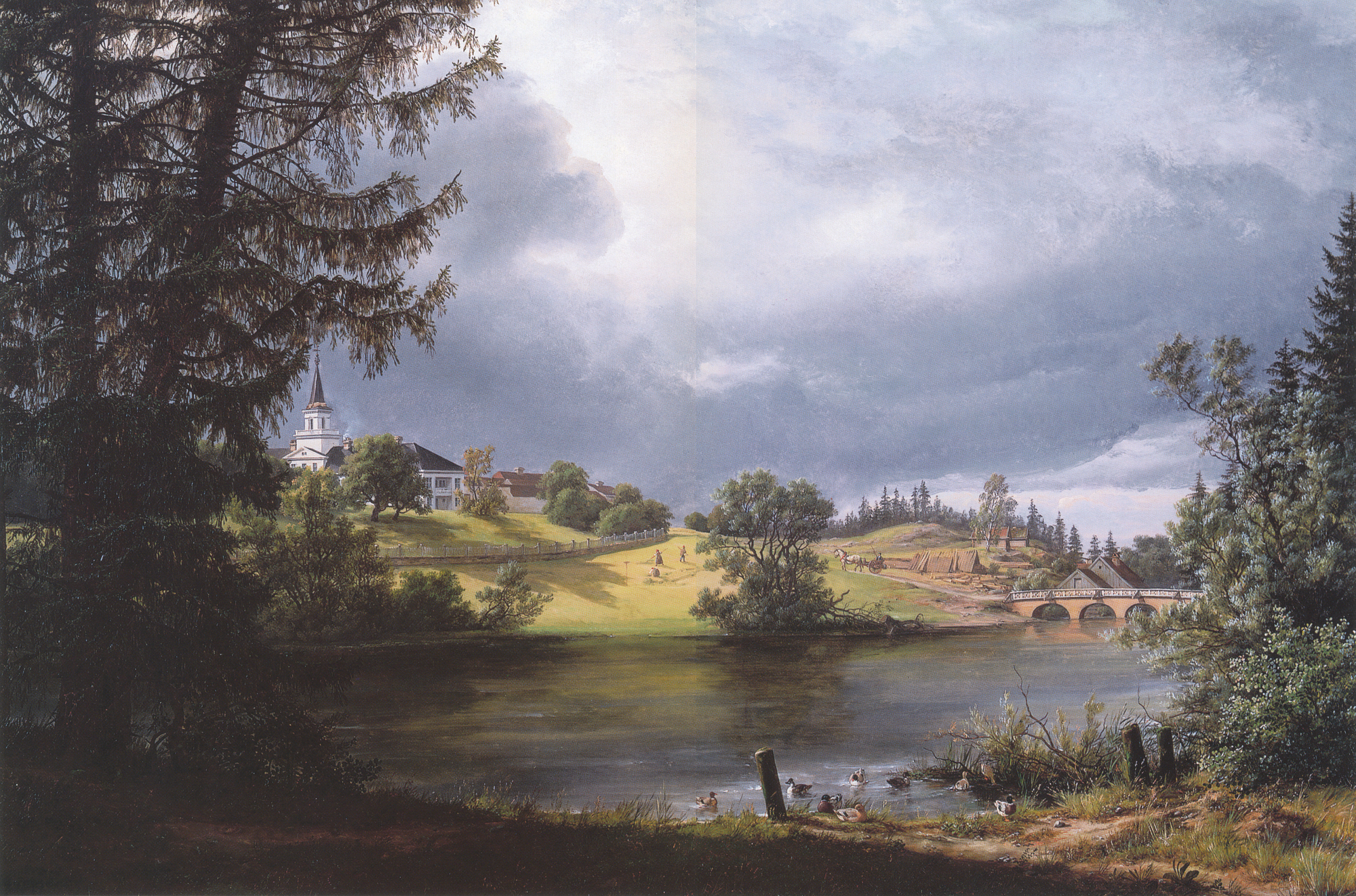
An old view of the area that is known as Frognerparken. The Frogner pond with the mansion Frogner Hovedgård behind. Romantic painting by Johan Christian Dahl from 1842

Bygdøy was the summer residence for the viceregent and had a renaissance garden from around 1680. The peninsula became an excursion spot by the end of the 18th century. Around 1830 a new garden in landscape style was created at Kongsgården and walks in the nearby woods were cleared.

Several of the estates around the city had grand linden alleys in the 18th century: Stubljan, Linderud, Søndre Bjølsen (currently Bjølsenparken) and Nordre Skøyen hovedgård. Linderud gård had a large garden with a 70-meter-long canal and a 120 alley of hazel trees. In the city center there are still linden alleys in Paléhagen, Regjeringsparken and Dronningparken.

The park surrounding Bogstad mansion from 1780 was the first in Norway in landscape style. Peder Anker engaged a gardener from Germany who utilized the slope from the main house down to the Bogstadvannet lake, with curved paths and artificial creeks. A similar style was applied when John Collett created the park around Ullevål gård, known for its rich variety of sentiments and as a center for the city's social life. Vækerø also had quite a large garden in a similar style and it is preserved today as Vækerøparken.

The wealthy Bernt Anker created a baroque park at Frogner hovedgård at the end of the 18th century. When Benjamin Wegner bought the estate in the early 19th century, a romantic landscape style park was created. That park included parts of what today is the Frogner Park. Around 1800 there was a total of 96 persons in the city that offered gardening services.

== 1812–1865: The first public parks ==
When tiny Christiania with around 10,000 inhabitants became capital of Norway in 1814, the foundations for creating parks were not favourable compared with other large cities in Europe:

- There were no castles with gardens, that could become a public park, as the Tuileries Palace.
- There were no continuous ramparts that could be demolished to make way for a park, as in Copenhagen (Tivoli Gardens, botanical garden, Ørsted park and Østre anlegg).
- There were no large areas in the center of the city that could be converted to parks, as the Royal Parks of London.

Before 1870 there was no consensus as to whether the city should engage in constructing parks. When the city's park administration was founded in 1875 and the rapid expansion of the city started, there were all the same several nice parks. Various private persons and organisations had provided for this:

- Citizens in the organisation Selskabet for Christiania Byes Vel had constructed several parks.
- State authorities engaged in creating a capital; the area at Tøyen to be used by the new university, the Botsfengselet jail with its surrounding park, areas in vicinity to the Akershus castle, the garden Universitetshagen behind the university.
- Landlords that did not want neighbours created Eidsvolls plass
- A Frenchman with grand ideas (Charles XIV John of Sweden and Norway) created Slottsparken and laid the foundation for the park areas on Bygdøy.
- A businessman with varied interests, Fritz Heinrich Frølich, created the St. Hanshaugen park.

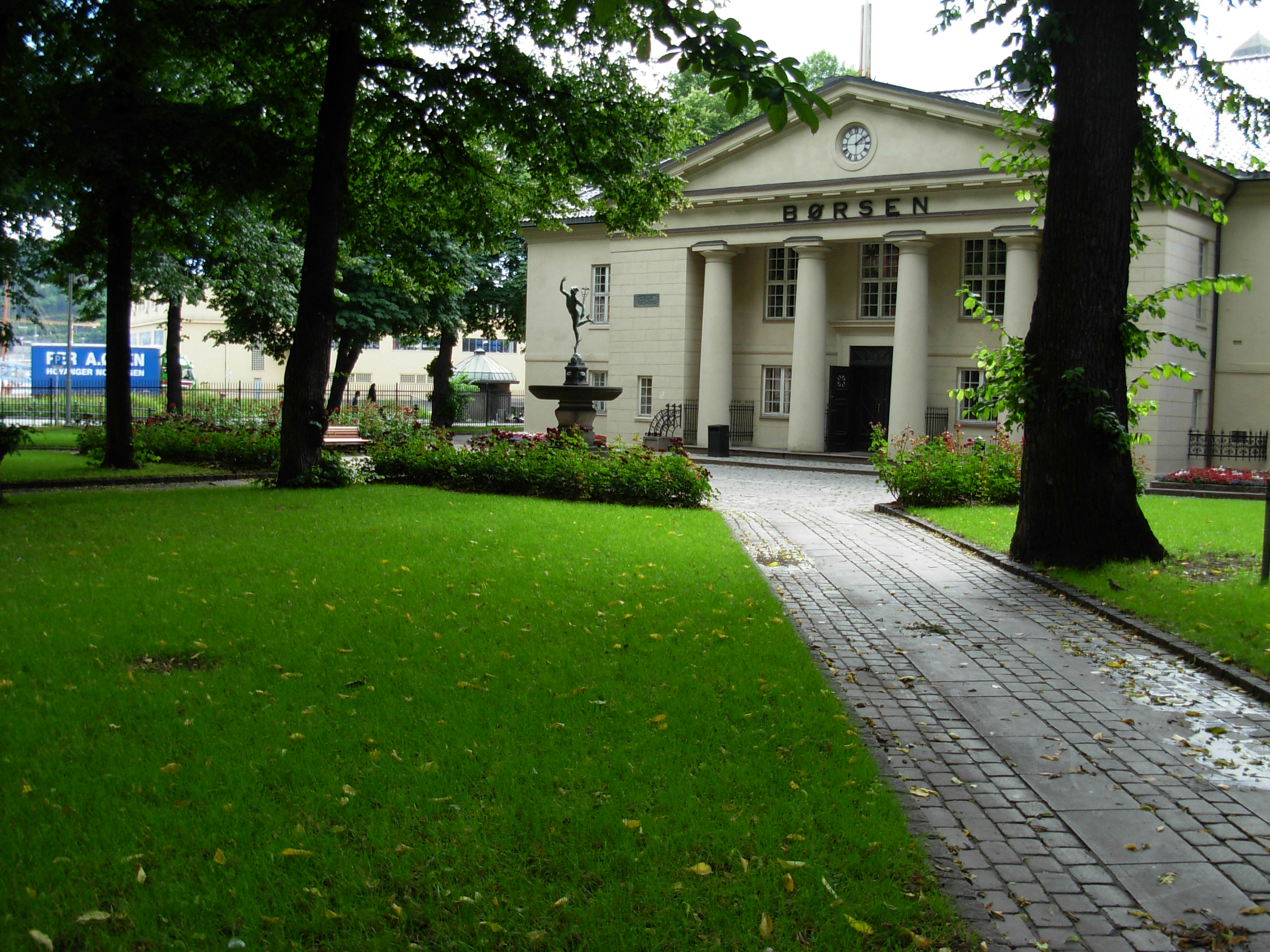
Børshagen park by the Oslo Stock Exchange

The Børshagen park was initiated by Christiania Byes Vel in 1812, the organisation cultivated an area previously known as Grønningen. This was the first publicly constructed park in Christiania and it was opened in 1819. It was named Esplanaden and was an important place for walks, even after the Christiania Stock Exchange opened in 1826.

The organisation Selskapet for Christiania Byes Vel concentrated on creation of public parks as one of its main priorities during its first fifty years of existence. At the bridge Nybrua crossing Akerselva the organisation erected the city's first outdoor monument in 1833, with a surrounding park. Bankplassen was laid out with the city's first bed of flowers in a public park (around 1860). Trees were planted around Oslo Cathedral and Trefoldighetskirken, and the organisation managed to stop construction at Kontraskjæret. Selskapet for Christiania Byes Vel did also organize planting of trees along various streets, among them Grønlandsleiret, the road from Nybrua to Tøyen, Drammensveien and Rådhusgata. Some of the trees are still standing across Kontraskjæret.

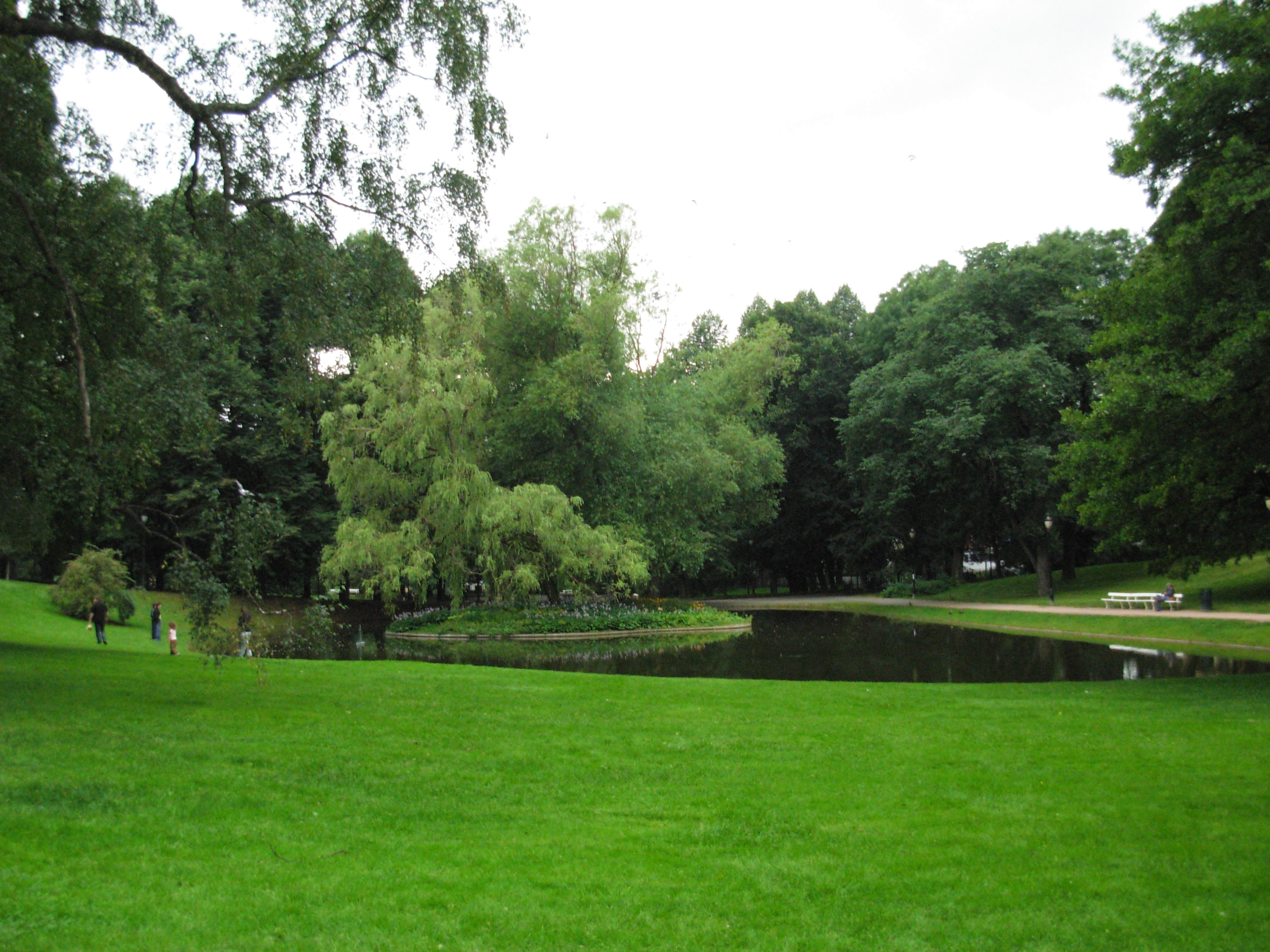
From Slottsparken that surrounds the Royal Castle, the pond named Kongespeilet, which both can be translated as the King's mirror and also points at an important Norwegian medieval text

The Slottsparken, surrounding the Royal Palace, was laid out from 1838 to 1844, in landscape style with large trees, paths, ponds and lawns in the curved terrain. Within Slottsparken the Dronningparken face Drammensveien and is a romantic, intimate park, constructed some years after the main park and in general closed for the public, except for a limited time during the summer. To the east, facing Karl Johans Street are the heights Abelhaugen and Nisseberget. The 225-decare large park has a number of well-known statues and sculptures.

King Charles' original plan for the park was for it to continue to the Uranienborg woods, where the Uranienborg church is today, and be part of a chain of parks from the Royal Castle to the Bygdøy peninsula. The king's monumental plans were not realized in full, but the Slottsparken is Oslo's major central city park and the landscape of the Bygdøy peninsula with its woods, beaches and paths has made a major imprint on the city. King Charles took possession of the mansion at Bygdøy and proclaimed the area as a public park in 1837. He bought enclosures along Frognerkilen and constructed Lindehagen, today's Dronningberget, north on Bygdøy. The wood that belongs to the Royal Mansion was designated as a protected area in 1940. King Oscar II constructed pathways west and north on the peninsula, as of 1882 there were about 10 kilometers of paths available for the public.

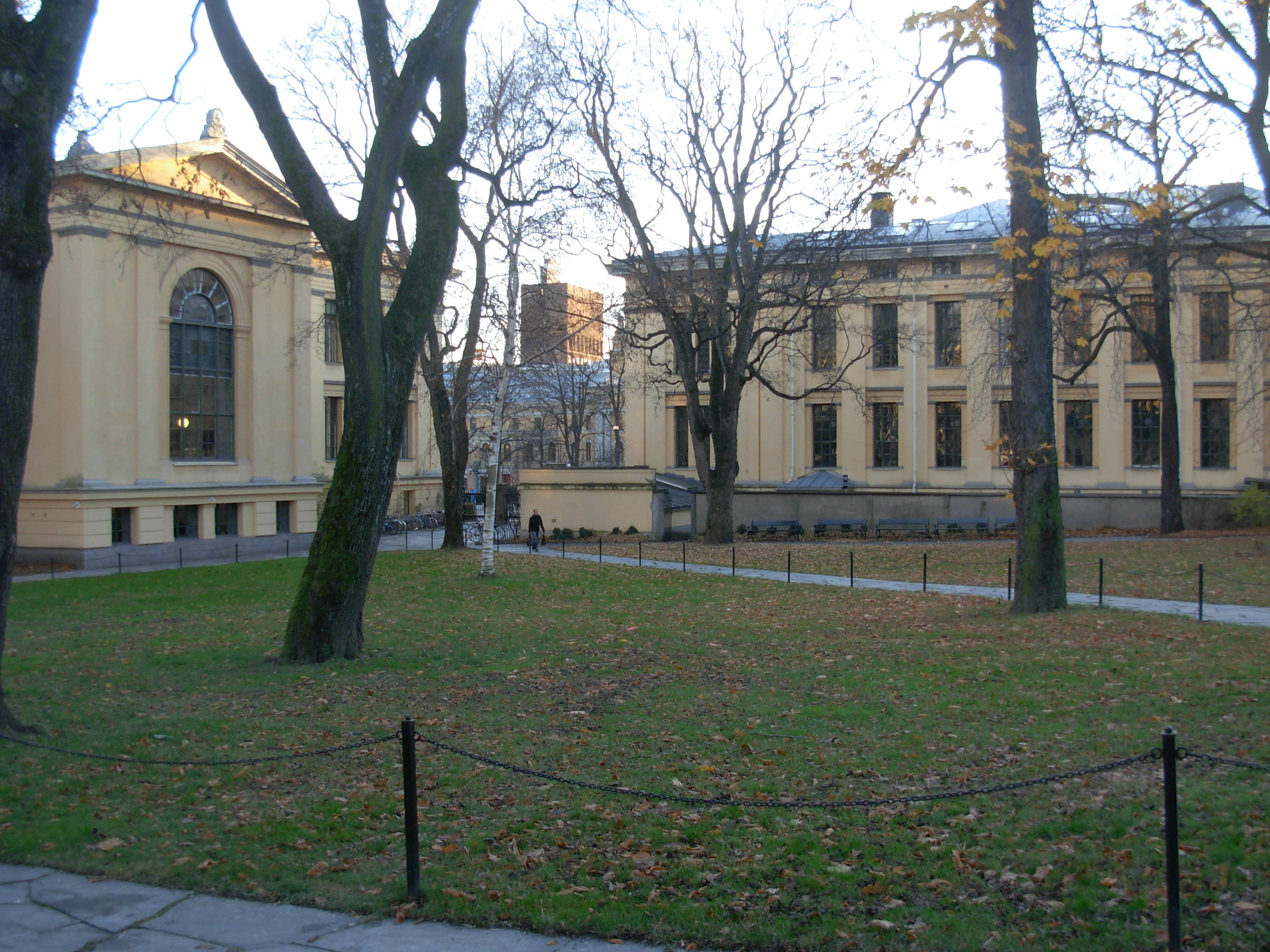
Universitetshagen, surrounded by the old university buildings, the Oslo city hall can be seen behind

Studenterlund in the center of Christiania was bought by the state in 1837; the area was by then a park called Ruseløkken park. After the university opened across the street in 1852, the park was much used by students and was hence named after them. A restaurant, Frizners pavilion, opened there in 1864. The park has been renewed several times over the years, the most significant when Nationaltheatret was constructed in the center of the park in 1899.

Eidsvolls plass, with the area today called "Spikersuppa" was purchased from the landlord's across Karl Johan's street in 1846. The large trees in the park are probably from around 1850. The area was then still swampy and the Bislett creek that traverses the park was still open, and not dug over before 1860. The state bought the area in 1858. It took some years before the park was finished. The statue of Henrik Wergeland was unveiled in 1881.

The park at the university was laid out around 1850, as an enclosed area between the university buildings at Karl Johan's street.

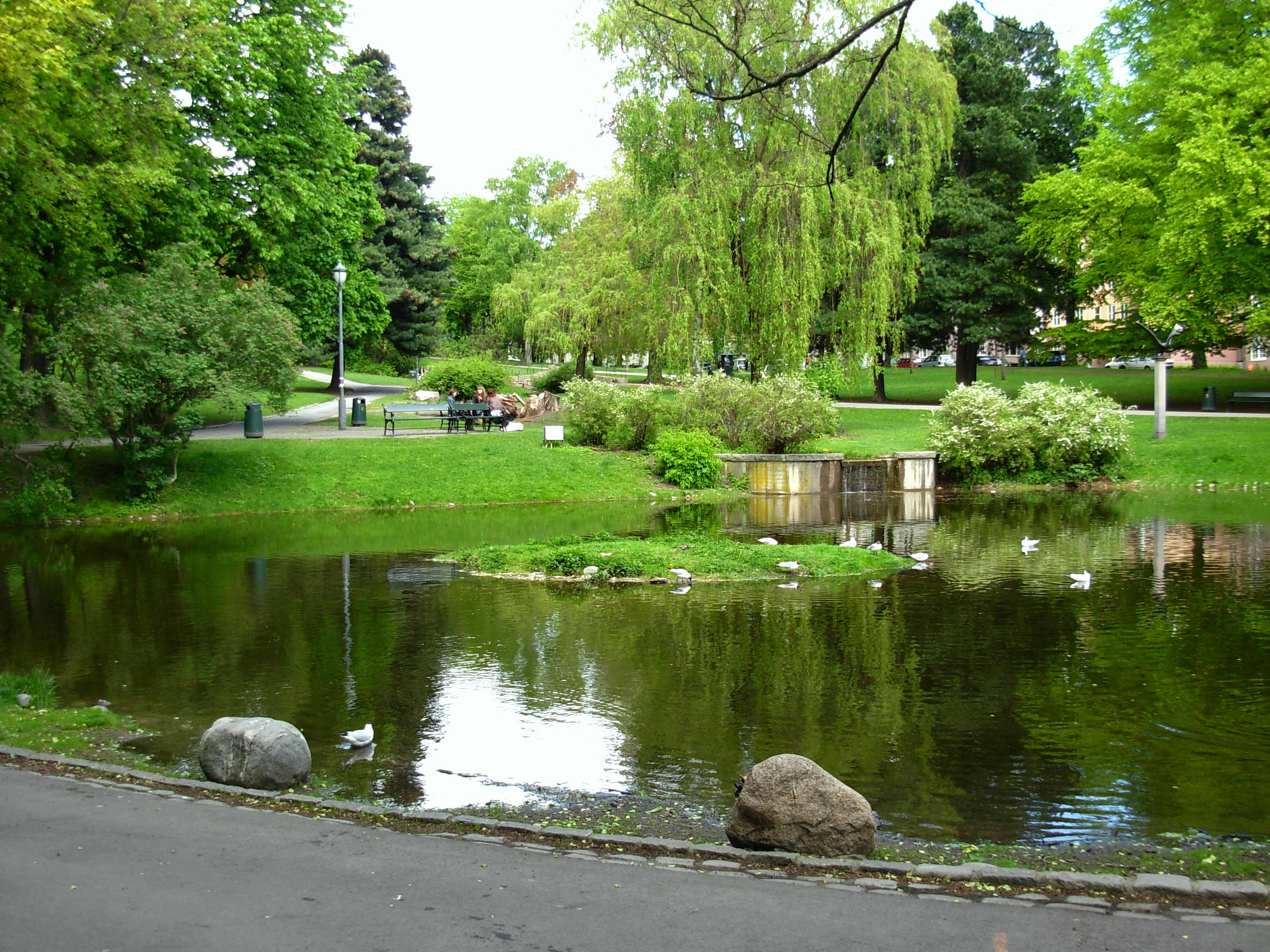
St. Hanshaugen park, the swan pond

The area at St. Hanshaugen was a scrap heap and viewed as a useless area until the celebration of summer solstice (St. Hans in Norwegian) was moved there some time before 1820. The businessman Fritz Heinrich Frølich initiated a park there around 1850, got his will after much initial resistance and paid for the first works. In the middle of the 1860s Christiania Byes Vel was involved with the new park, planted 1275 trees and helped create the first major park outside the city center. From 1867 the city took responsibility for the park and the last major works were carried out in the years 1876–1890. The final part of the park was added with purchases of land in 1909. St. Hanshaugen had its heyday as an attraction from 1890 to the First World War. It is a classic city park where terrain, vegetation and water is used. The mixture of intimate and romantic areas in the south with more plain areas in the northern part, entertainment, a restaurant (Hasselbakken), animals (birds and bears in a cage) all added to making the park popular.

The area around Tøyen was designated for the city's first university, from when the state bought the mansion Tøyen hovedgård and until around 1820, when it was decided that the university should be in the center of the city. In the years 1814–18 the botanical garden was laid out, and from around 1830 several enclosures were given to professors at the new university, the one remaining being Bellevue in Tøyenparken. The state ownership of the area helped preserve large areas for the future park.

Around the prison Botsfengselet (opened 1851) there was established a park, today known as Grønlands park and Klosterenga.

The city was not particularly late in creating public parks; Bremen established its first park in 1804, Stockholm had its first public park Strömparterren in 1832 while New York City got its Central Park by the end of the 1850s.

== 1865–1916: Refuge from the city ==
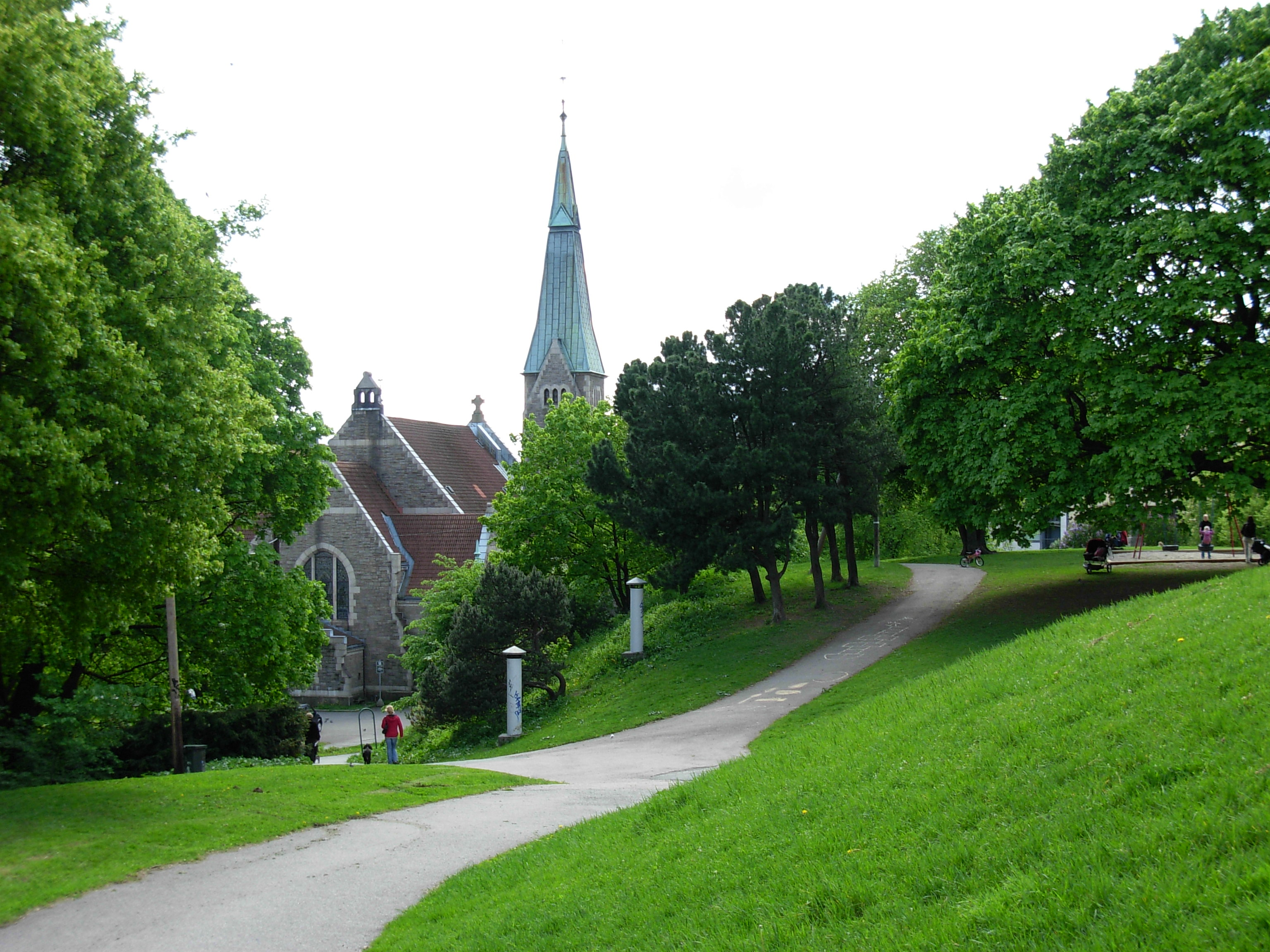
Stensparken, seen towards Fagerborg Church

Around 1870 the view regarding parks changed; it was now seen as a natural task for the city's authorities. The view was that parks had two positive effects:

- It would soften the harmful influence from the city, noise, soot, smoke and dirt from the expanding industry and straitened circumstances.
- It would give the city residents an aesthetic impact that was educative and curative.

Christiania grew faster than most European cities around 1870–1890. Property developers built houses and villas while the city provided roads, water and sanitation. Owing to fire regulations the building material was brick, and this is largely the area that today is inside Ring 2 (the bypass road 2). Several new parks were created, most of them in the eastern part of the city. The argument giving priority to the eastern part was that it was the most crowded part of the city and was thus most in need of parks.

The city's expansion and the creation of a tram network contributed to increased commuting. Combined with steadily reduced working hours, this created a need to fill the available leisure time with activities. Some of the parks, like Kampen park, were used extensively from the time they were ready. The city's park organisation from 1875, Christiania beplantningsvesen, was a new authority for creating and maintaining parks.

In 1897, the Paléhaven (currently named Christian Frederiks plass) in the city center was ready as a public park. Børshagen was upgraded when Kristiania Stock Exchange expanded in 1911. The city took responsibility for Studenterlunden and Eidsvolls plass in 1888 and 1889. Grev Wedels plass by the quarter called Kvadraturen was laid out as a 14-decare park in 1869, initiated by Christiania Byes Vel. The park was created on an area previously used by the armed forces.

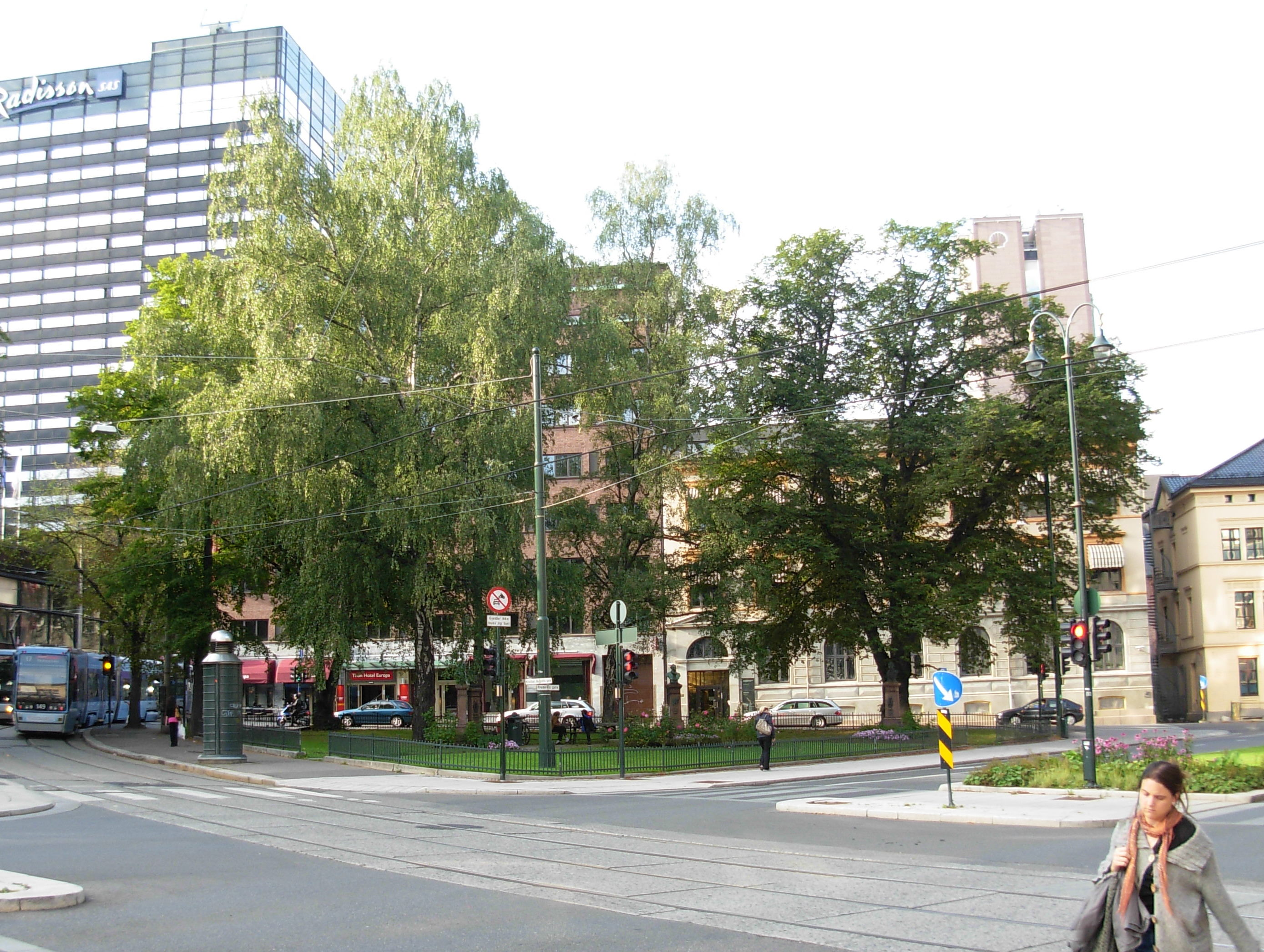
The Halfdan Kjerulf area

From 1869 to 1880 several smaller parks were created in the central part of the city:

- By the Oslo Cathedral, 3 decare, in 1870
- By Trefoldighetskirken
- By Old Aker Church
- By Grønland kirke
- Halfdan Kjerulfs plass
- Bankplassen
- Nordraaks plass
- Solli plass

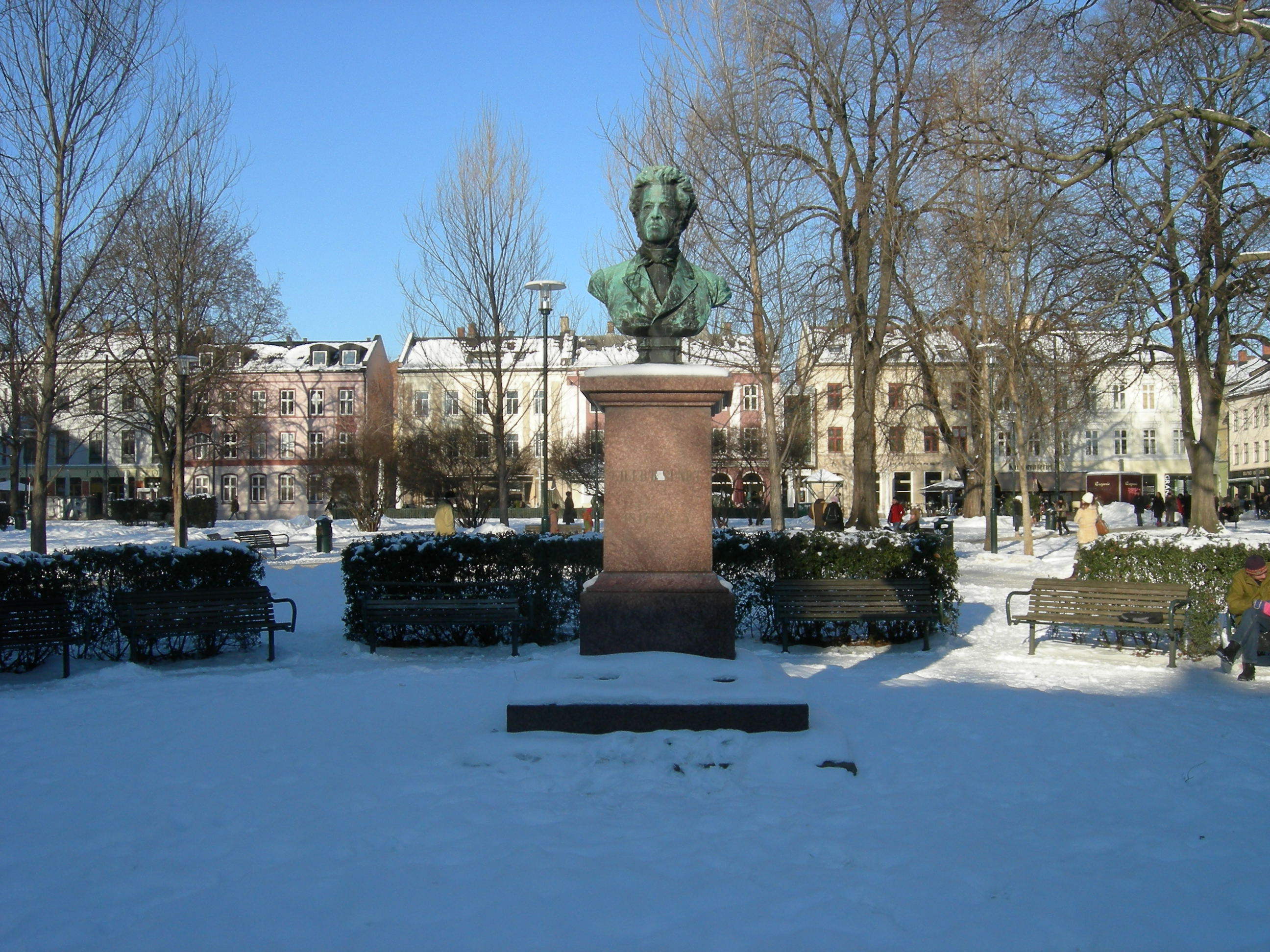
Olaf Ryes place

The park around Sagene kirke was ready in 1893. A minor park in what is currently known as Ruinparken was ready in 1872, the first park that indicated the medieval part of the city.

Around 1865 the architect Georg Andreas Bull sketched a general plan for Grünerløkka. One owner and one architect for the whole area turned out as a good solution concerning parks. Three spacious parks were planned in the otherwise densely populated area. Whole blocks assigned to parks were inspired by the renovation of Paris. Birkelunden and Olaf Ryes plass, laid out in 1882 and 1890, became two very popular parks. Schous plass at the southern perimeter of the area was ready in 1916. This gave together with the 1915 construction of parks along the river Akerselva the inhabitants of Grünerløkka good access to green areas.

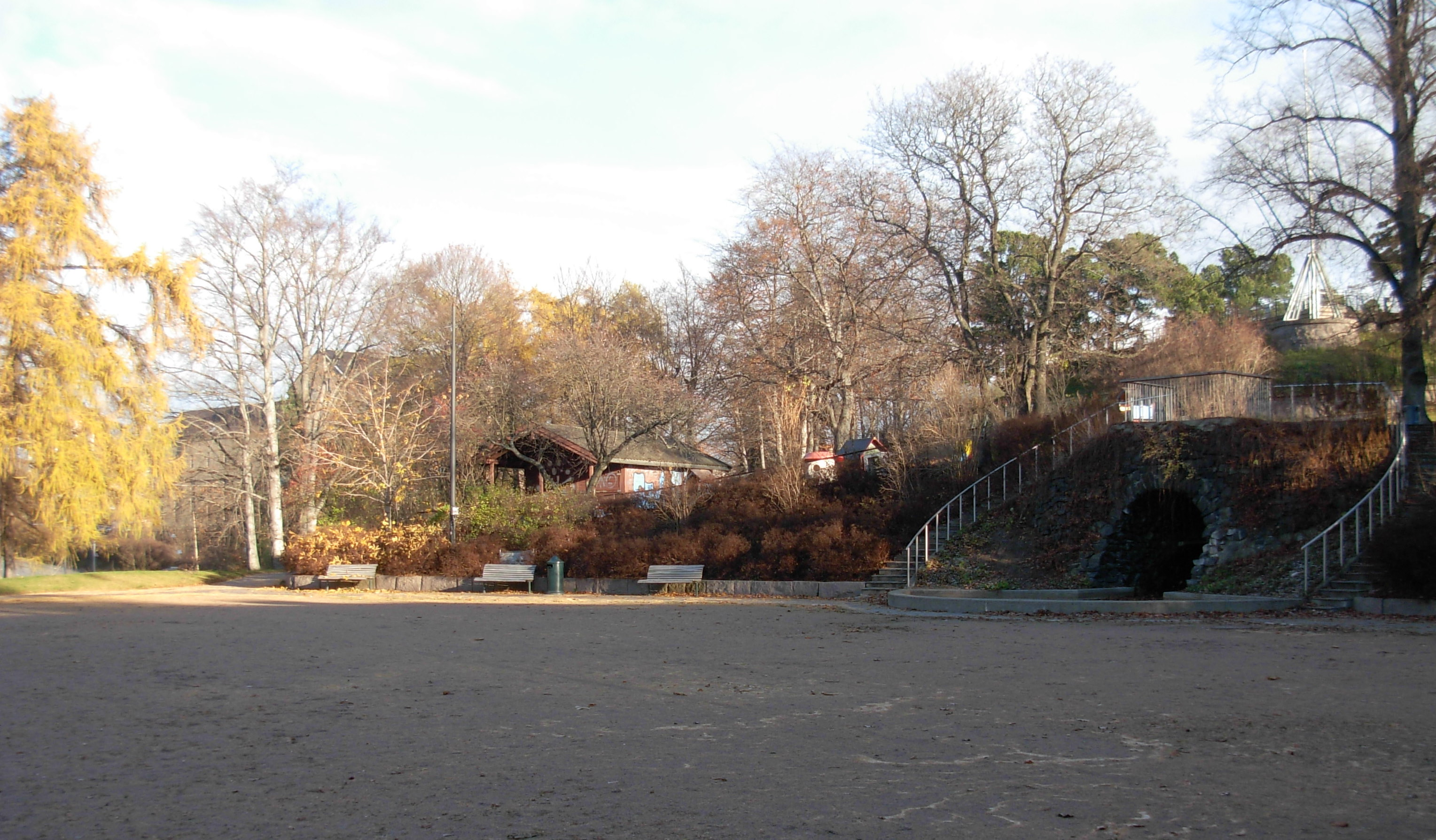
Kampen park, lower part

Kampen park was opened in 1888, on a height with a water reservoir. The view, the exciting terrain and the cavern with water where children could play were reasons for the popularity of this classic park. The nearby Vålerenga park was created in the years 1903–1916. It had the Vålerenga church in its center and views of Lodalen.

Bjølsenparken was laid out in 1900 on a part of the garden belonging to Søndre Bjølsen mansion, known for its linden alley along the ridge of the park. A large area west of the park has been assigned allotment gardening from 1912. Grønland park, surrounding the main prison Botsfengselet, sometimes called Botsparken, was opened in 1913.

Stensparken was the only major new park on the western part of the city in this period and was constructed on a hill that had been used to dump garbage. The height Korpehaugen (Blåsen) is an untouched part of nature within the park. The park was constructed in landscape style from 1890 and was finished during the Second World War. The Fagerborg Church is in the southern part of the park.

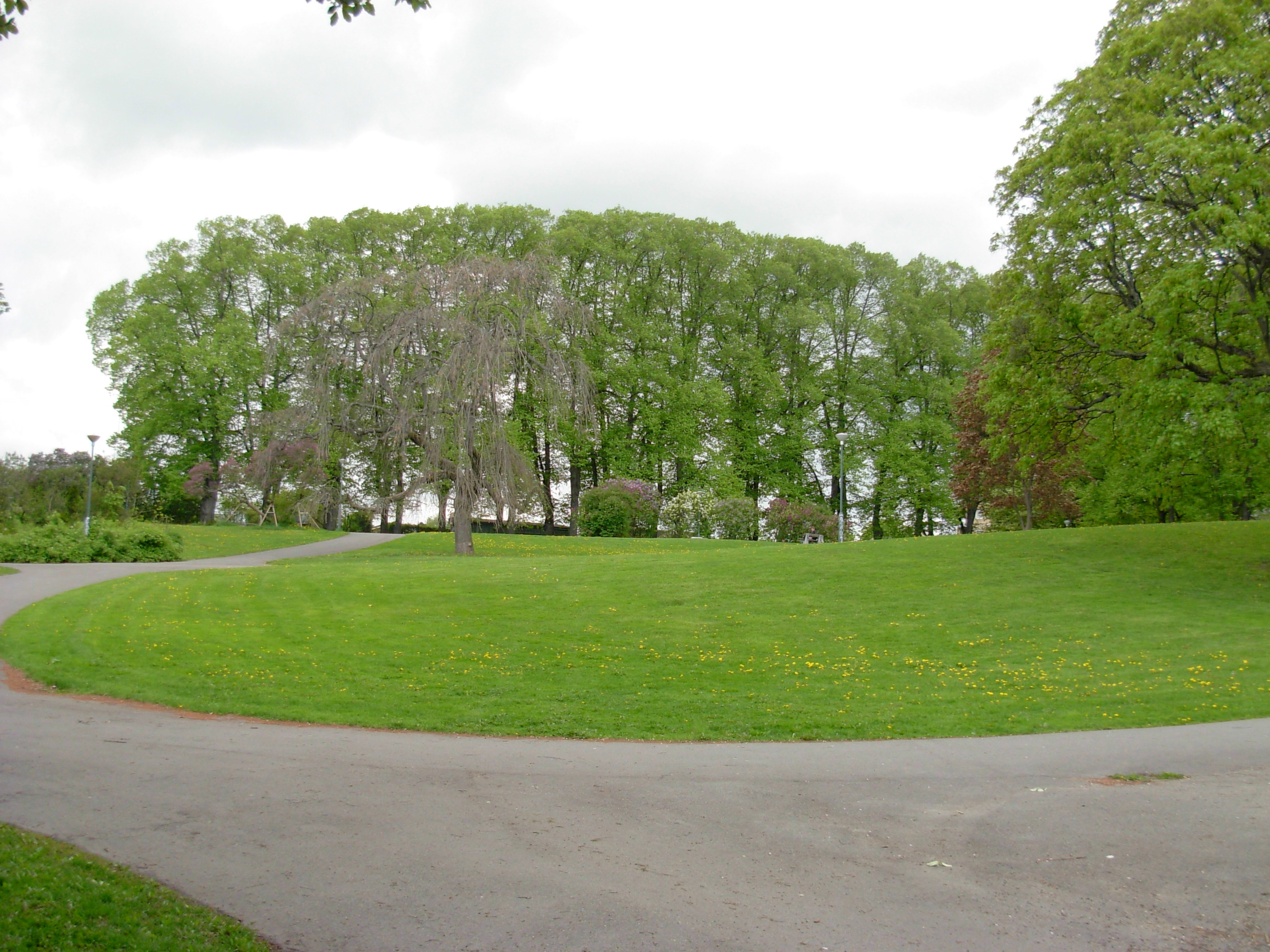
Bjølsenparken with the linden alley

Uranienborgparken was opened in 1904 on the height where Uranienborg Church was constructed in 1886. The park is sited north-east of the church and parts of it were used for building a playground in 1922 and a kindergarten in 1954. South of the height Riddervolds plass was laid out as a park in 1885.

Aside from the two above mentioned parks, no major parks were laid out on the western part of the city; the reason for this being that there was no single major developer in the area. Hence, there is a striking lack of green spaces from Majorstuen to the city center, which is also true of the Frogner area.

To the west of this densely inhabited part of the city, the first stage of the Frogner Park was opened in 1904, the previous Baroque garden between Frogner Manor and the street Kirkeveien. For the 1914 Jubilee Exhibition paths were laid out west of the manor and bridges were built over the ponds.

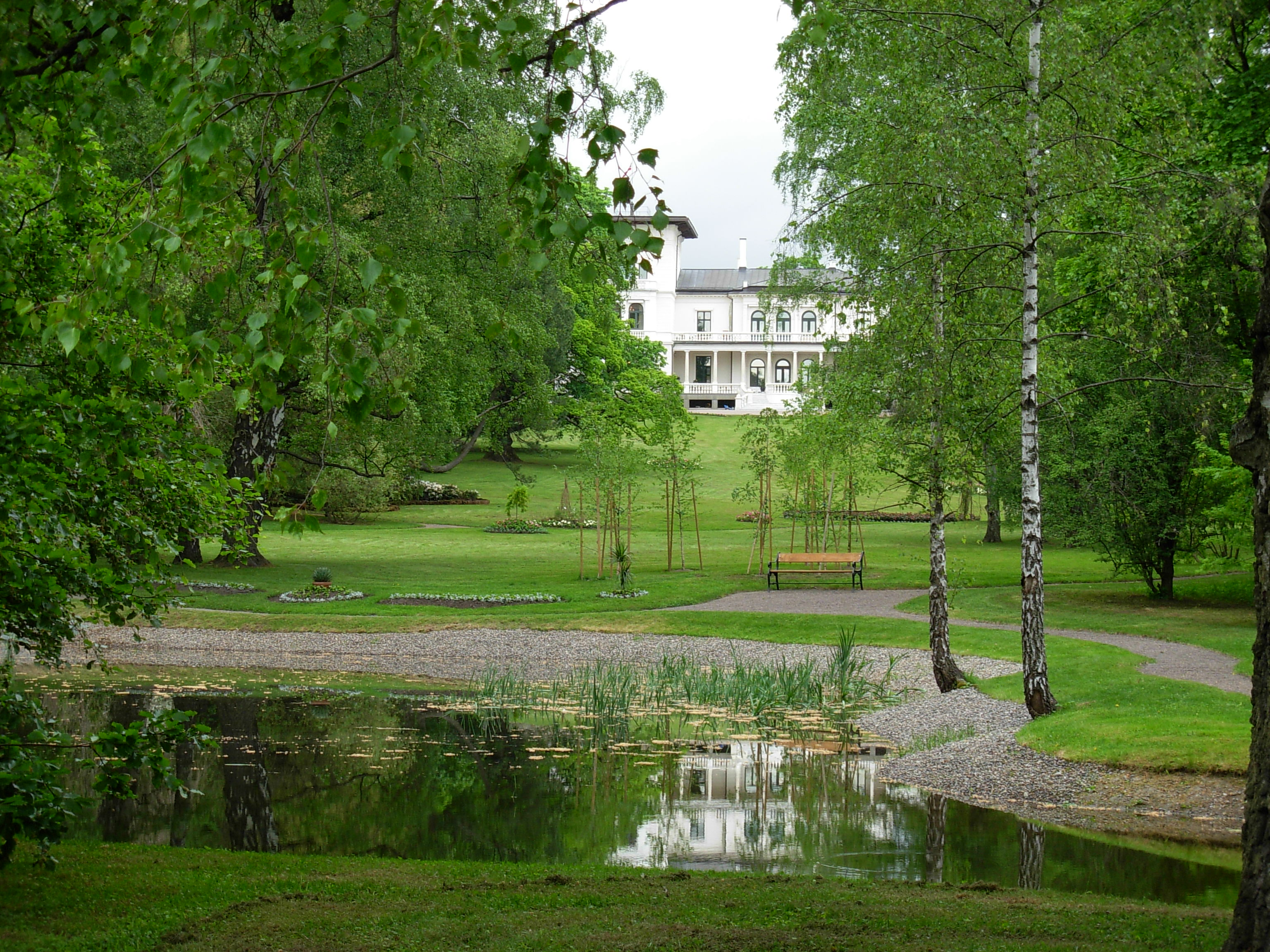
Skøyenparken seen towards Søndre Skøyen mansion

Among streets with trees the Bygdø allé, laid out around 1890 soon got a reputation for its chestnuts. The trees grew, and towering close to the buildings by the street, the common view was that the solution used for Gyldenløves street, where there is an alley in the center of the street, was a better one. In connection with the Jubilee exhibition in 1914 the street Kirkeveien alongside the Frogner Park was widened and got trees in the centre strip.

Some of the mansions in the area laid out private parks in the period, which later became public parks, as Skøyenparken (Søndre Skøyen mansion, Ullern borough), a large park in landscape style constructed around 1860.

Part of the slope on the western side of Ekeberg was bought by the city in 1889 to secure the area for the public and prevent developers from destroying the well known landscape.

Park concerts organised by the city started in 1907, which were popular for multiple years. A number of them were still in existence as of 2007. In 1901, park libraries were constructed in three parks, though the libraries in two of them were closed the same year as they opened. Nonetheless, there was a park library in St. Hanshaugen until 1907.

== 1916–1940: An active public park policy ==
The years 1916–17 were important for the parks and the green city. The city park organisation (Parkvesenet) was established as an independent body, with Marius Røhne as the city gardener. He had established the country's first garden architect firm and became a decisive leader for the organisation. The city established a park committee, with the well-known politician Fernanda Nissen from the Norwegian Labour Party as its first leader. The committee managed to get development of parks into public debate.

The city's options for enforcing its policy were strengthened by the new role the city obtained from 1911 in developing housing projects. In a number of projects there were large areas covered by the plans, under the city planning officer Harald Hals.

The class struggle and industrial actions during and after the First World War also reached Norway, and just after the war the eight-hour day was introduced. A huge part of the population in Oslo was workers, and they now got markedly more spare time. The workers' parties laid pressure on the city so it would support this extra free time with added options for activities.

Until the start of the Second World War a number of initiatives were taken, as part of a coordinated city policy for parks and green spaces. The city park policy was part of a new city welfare policy that made Oslo known abroad.

The first years green areas in residential areas got priority, ahead of the parks in the city center. The city park organisation maintained that by constructing robust and neat parks and removing fences the public would engage in keeping them tidy, which worked. By the end of the period the budgets were pressed and the new parks stretched the resources. The parks had to be made simpler and flowerbeds removed.

=== Pathways, street trees, playgrounds and green housing areas ===
"Parks and parklike walkways shall create parkveins through the city", a plan for park development from 1916 to 1917 stated. Parks and the green corridors were integrated with the city plan, especially during development of the large areas outside the city center that the commune had bought around the start of the 20th century. The park corridors should connect the various parks and thus enhance the value of each individual park, and in concert they should connect the city to Marka, the forested and hilly areas surrounding Oslo. The park corridors planned was:

- The riverbanks of Akerselva, developed from 1917 from Nybrua and north
- From Akerselva through Birkelunden, Dælenenga playing field, the Torshov valley to Grefsenkollen; this corridor were developed up to north of Sinsenkrysset but not to Grefsenkollen
- From the Botanical Garden on Tøyen through Tøyenparken, Kampen park, Ensjø and Valle Hovin and from there in branches to Etterstad, Østmarka, Østensjø, Linderud, Alnabru, Grorud and Ekeberg
- Rådhusplassen – Bygdøy – Frognerparken – Gaustad – Sognsvann
- Alexander Kiellands plass – Geitmyra – Gråbeinsletta – Voldsløkka – Bjølsenparken – Korsvoll – Maridalen
- Frognerparken – Smestad – Huseby – Holmenkollen

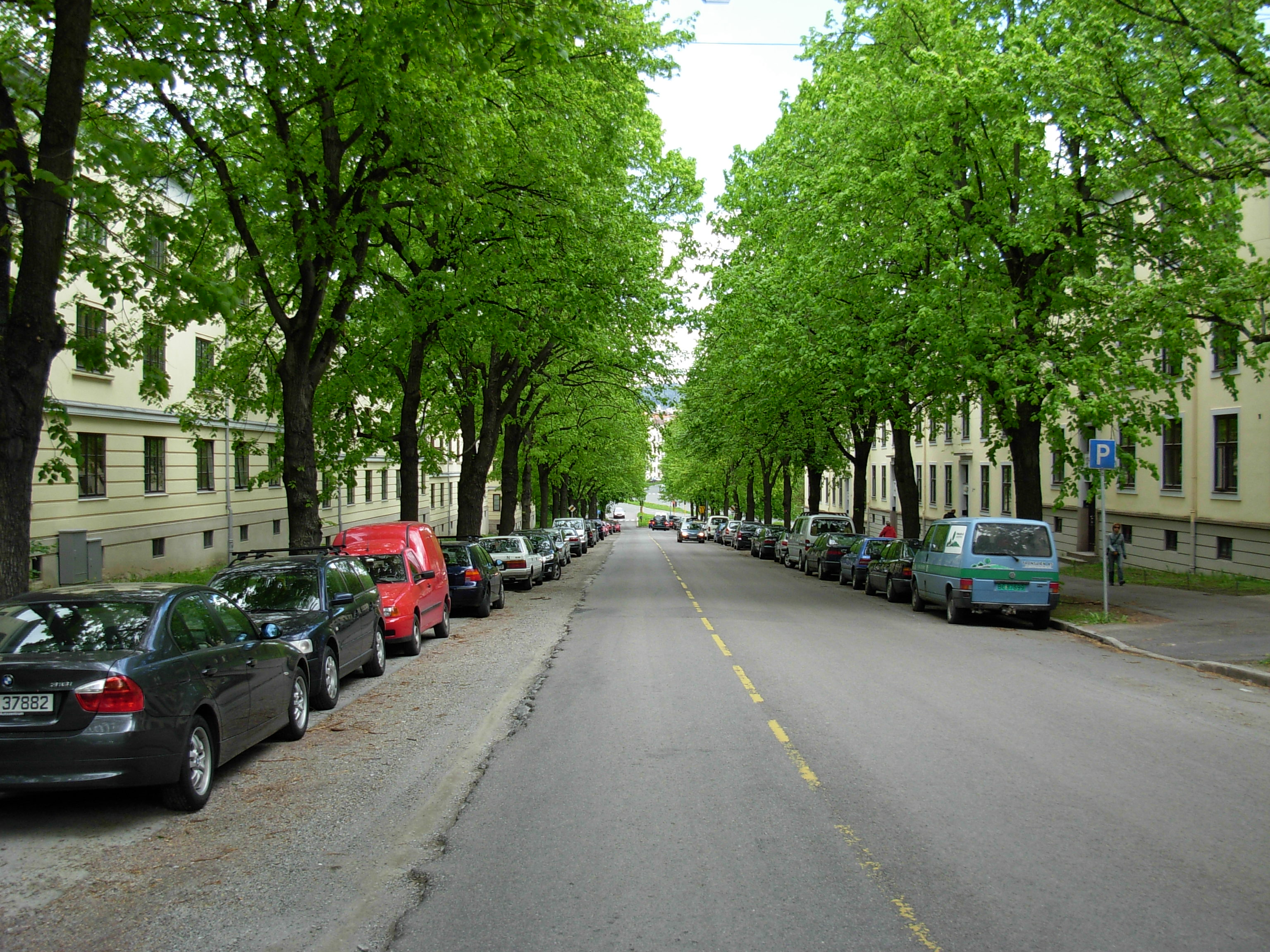
Collets gate (street) seen towards Uelands gate, flanked by trees

The city's park organisation got responsibility for new green areas surrounding communal housing projects at Ila, Torshov, Lindern, Åsen, Rosenhoff, Vøyenvollen and around communal schools and nursing homes.

The length of streets with trees was expanded from 6,000 meters to about 20,000 between 1916 and 1947. The major street Kirkeveien got trees from Majorstuen to Vestre Aker Church, and from 1930 parts of Colletts gate, Uelands gate and Christian Michelsens gate were widened and flanked by trees.

A total of 33 playgrounds with communal employed guards were systematically expanded until 1940, a number of these were partly covered with ice in the winter, for skating while concerts and theater plays in the parks sponsored by the city continued.

=== New parks and Akerselva as park ===
Birkelunden was the first park that was maintained by the new communal park organisation; the renovation was finished in 1917 and people were surprised by the difference a park built by professionals made. Pathways were not slippery in rain or dusty during drought, plants and trees were cared for, and the area was illuminated. Acts of vandalism receded and Birkelunden became a meetingground in the interwar years, very much used for political meetings, concerts and such.

Torshovparken was the first park laid out by Parkvesenet after a united plan for an area, Torshovbyen that was built by the municipality from 1917 to 1924. The park is on a hill with views of the city and the Oslo fjord, with a music pavilion at the peak. The park opened in 1931, and is a mixture of the formal park style with axis, symmetry and a pavilion in the center and functionalism with soft use of the terrain and large, continuous plains.

Alexander Kiellands plass was completed in 1927 as a park in formal style, nevertheless it became a textbook example of how lack of continuous maintenance would degrade a park. Already before 1940 it was worn and little used. It was renovated around 1980 but again let to rot. In 2001 it was once again renovated, with fountains and ponds which made it was once again an impressive small park. However, 6 years later, it was once more run down, owing to lack of maintenance.

On the eastern part of the city other parks were laid out:

- Grønlands park on the green parts surrounding the city prison Botsfengslet (1917)
- Gråbeinsletta west of Sagene church (1922)
- Rudolf Nilsens space (previously Vahls space) (1927)
- Kuba by Akerselva on Grünerløkka (1928)
- Bülow Hanssens space by Carl Berners space (1939)

Evald Ryghs space on Ila gives a view of the park policy for the city's districts. It was laid out as a communal housing project (Ilakomplekset) in 1930 and combines a traditional park with a playground. On the western part of the city the following parks were laid out:

- Ankerhagen at Ruseløkka (1921)
- Amaldus Nielsens space (Vestkanttorget), a not very successful trading space, converted to park (1930)
- Idioten on Valleløkken by Adamstuen (1930)
- Langgaardsløkken, an old enclosure on Briskeby (1930)
- Arno Bergs space on Briskeby (1932)
- Skarpsnoparken by Frognerkilen (1934)

Starting in 1915 the river banks of Akerselva were landscaped, starting with Theodor Kittelsens plass and the area around Nybrua and Ankerbrua, which were finished around 1920. The area from Nybrua to Østre Elvebakke was readied in 1937. A section by Brekkedammen where the river starts was landscaped around 1930. The large area on the hill Ekeberg was landscaped in the interwar years and was readied in 1948 as a large area for recreation and sports.

=== Frogner Park with the Vigeland installation ===
The Frogner Park is composed of the farmland of the old Frogner Manor; the buildings of the manor is situated in the southern part of the park. During World War I the park was used for cultivating food; the potato harvests in particular were large. By the start of the interwar years much of the area was landscaped. The fountains were the first part of the Vigeland installation, the work started after a resolution in 1924. Until around 1950 the work was concentrated on the 850-metre (2,790 ft) long monumental sculpture park in Baroque style. In the years before the work started, there were heated discussions regarding the layout of the park, whether the main axis should be east–west or north–south. The monolith was erected as a single granite block in 1928; three stone cutters worked on the 200-tonne (200-long-ton; 220-short-ton) and 17-metre (56 ft) tall sculpture until 1942 when it finally was unveiled.

== 1940–1945 ==
Norway was invaded by Germany on 9 April 1940, and already on April 16 the park administration initiated the use of all suitable areas the city owned for growing potatoes and turnip. Within short time voluntary communal work was organized to cultivate food production in parks, playgrounds and gardens, 35 different areas by the summer of 1940.

Many parks were also used by the German Wehrmacht for barracks, parking equipment and workshops and so damaged the parks. When the second world war ended the park administration had a huge job restoring the parks back to their original state. At the playground on Sophus Bugges plass there were concrete strongholds until 1953 and between the creek and Madserud allé in Frognerparken there were barracks used by the SS.

== List of parks ==
Below is a list of major parks and open spaces in Oslo. The tables are split between the various areas of Oslo. The tables give the name of the park, size, the year established and the coordinates.

=== Sentrum ===
Parks and open spaces in Central Oslo include

| Park | Size | | Year | Coordinates |
| Park | decares | acres | Year | Coordinates |
|---|---|---|---|---|
| Slottsparken (The Palace Park) | 225 | 56 | 1850 | 59.917634°N 10.72780°E |
| Kontraskjæret | 18 | 4.4 | 1970 | 59.909997°N 10.736496°E |
| Eidsvolls plass | 16 | 4.0 | Around 1861 | 59.913644°N 10.73729°E |
| Grev Wedels plass | 14 | 3.5 | 1869 / 1984 | 59.90734°N 10.742376°E |
| Studenterlunden | 11 | 2.7 | Before 1845 | 59.914547°N 10.734619°E |
| Universitetshagen (The University Garden) | 9 | 2.2 | 1850s / 1932 | 59.915951°N 10.734791°E |
| Vaterlandsparken | 9 | 2.2 | 1994 | 59.913036°N 10.757096°E |
| Rådhushagen (The City Hall Garden) | 4 | 1.0 | 1947 | 59.912181°N 10.732656°E |
| Christian Frederiks plass (Paléhaven) | 3 | 0.7 | 1750s / 1897 | 59.910083°N 10.750272°E |
| Halfdan Kjerulfs plass | 0.5 | 0.1 | 1861 | 59.917656°N 10.735273°E |
| Regjeringsparken | — | — | Around 1990 | 59.915195°N 10.745004°E |

Børshagen, the city's first publicly created park (4 decare, 1819, 59.915435°N 10.745463°E), is no longer open for the public.

=== Inner city ===
The table shows parks in the inner city of Oslo, excluding the city center. Parks without proper info regarding size are arranged after estimated size. The minor parks are described under the table.

| Park | Size, decare | Year | Area | District | Coordinates |
|---|---|---|---|---|---|
| Frognerparken (a section of the park belongs to the outer city) | 467 | 1904 / 1936 | Frogner | Frogner og Ullern | 59.909132°N 10.748236°E |
| Botanisk hage | 140 | 1818 | Tøyen | Grünerløkka | 59.925900°N 10.704813°E |
| Torshovdalen | 136 | 1939 / 1948 | Torshov, Rosenhoff | Sagene | 59.917191°N 10.770604°E |
| Tøyenparken | 93 | 1950s | Tøyen | Grünerløkka | 59.917870°N 10.778131°E |
| St. Hanshaugen | 89 | 1865 | St. Hanshaugen | St. Hanshaugen | 59.933539°N 10.776813°E |
| Sofienberg Park | 74 | 1961 | Sofienberg, Grünerløkka | Grünerløkka | 59.926923°N 10.741251°E |
| Stensparken with Blåsen | 49 | 1890 / 1943 | Fagerborg | St. Hanshaugen | 59.922849°N 10.764282°E |
| Marienlystparken | 45 | * | Marienlyst | St. Hanshaugen | 59.928904°N 10.730752°E |
| Torshovparken | 41 | 1931 | Torshov | Sagene | 59.933374°N 10.722390°E |
| Myraløkka | around 40 | around 1960 | Sagene | Sagene | 59.916315°N 10.765641°E |
| Kampen park | 39 | 1888 | Kampen | Gamle Oslo | 59.935130°N 10.770613°E |
| Bjølsenparken | 33 | before 1900 | Bjølsen | Sagene | 59.915271°N 10.780529°E |
| Vålerenga park | 32 | 1903 | Vålerenga | Gamle Oslo | 59.940399°N 10.755939°E |
| Middelalderparken | 30 | 2000 | Gamlebyen | Gamle Oslo | 59.907041°N 10.787043°E |
| Klosterenga | 30 | * | Galgeberg | Gamle Oslo | 59.903263°N 10.762374°E |
| Iladalen park | 26 | 1948 | Ila | Sagene | 59.931773°N 10.752176°E |
| Uranienborgparken | 17 | 1904 | Uranienborg | Frogner | 59.921319°N 10.721064°E |
| Birkelunden | 17 | 1882 / 1916 | Grünerløkka | Grünerløkka | 59.921319°N 10.721064°E |
| Grønlands park and Botsparken | 15 | 1917 / 1924 | Grønland | Gamle Oslo | 59.926005°N 10.760296°E |
| Hasleparken | 14 | * | Hasle | Grünerløkka | 59.920978°N 10.783164°E |
| Ruinparken (previously called Minneparken) | 14 | 1872 / 1932 | Gamlebyen | Gamle Oslo | 59.920978°N 10.783164°E |
| Hallénparken | 13 | * | Dælenenga / Torshov | Grünerløkka | 59.906206°N 10.768855°E |
| Grünerhagen | 12 | 1700-t. / 1950 | Grünerløkka | Grünerløkka | 59.930832°N 10.763249°E |
| Idioten | 12 | 1930 | Valleløkken, Adamstuen | St. Hanshaugen | 59.921964°N 10.755076°E |
| Olaf Ryes plass | 10 | 1888 / 1928 | Grünerløkka | Grünerløkka | 59.930993°N 10.737096°E |
| Rudolf Nilsens plass | 9 | 1927 / 1999 | Tøyen | Gamle Oslo | 59.922818°N 10.758460°E |
| Sinsenparken | 8.5 | | Sinsen | Grünerløkka | 59.5559°N 10.4782068°E |
| Framneshaven (Tinker'n) | 8 | 1993 | Skillebekk | Frogner | 59.936506°N 10.757574°E |
| Gråbeinsletta (with the park around Sagene kirke 11 decare) | 7 | 1922 | Sagene | Sagene | 59.937786°N 10.751809°E |
| Skarpsnoparken | 7 | 1934 | Skarpsno | Frogner | 59.937786°N 10.751809°E |
| Alexander Kiellands plass | 7 | 1927 / 2001 | Ila | Grünerløkka | 59.914929°N 10.700262°E |
| Kristparken | 7 | 1964 | St. Hanshaugen | St. Hanshaugen | 59.927400°N 10.750551°E |
| Schous plass | 6 | 1916 | Grünerløkka | Grünerløkka | 59.917460°N 10.748616°E |
| Langgaardsløkken | 6 | 1930 | Briskeby | Frogner | 59.920492°N 10.760262°E |
| Hydroparken | 5 | 1960 | Frogner | Frogner | 59.922871°N 10.715319°E |
| Amaldus Nielsens plass (Vestkanttorget) | 5 | 1930 | Frogner | Frogner | 59.914553°N 10.715935°E |
| Sommerfrydhagen | 4 | 1995 | Tøyen | Gamle Oslo | 59.924057°N 10.713881°E |
| Svartdalsparken | * | 1930s | Svartdalen | Gamle Oslo | 59.911738°N 10.776487°E |
| Evald Ryghs plass | 4 | 1931 | Ila | St. Hanshaugen | 59.904479°N 10.792130°E |
| Bülow Hanssens plass | 4 | 1939 | Carl Berner | Grünerløkka | 59.929289°N 10.747371°E |
| Kværnerparken | 3.5 | 1922 | Enebakkveien | Gamle Oslo | 59.54949°N 10.4734°E |
| Frøyas have | * | 1994 | Skarpsno | Frogner | 59.926808°N 10.775930°E |
| Akersveien / Akersbakken in front of Gamle Aker kirke | 2 | 1869 | Gamle Aker | St. Hanshaugen | 59.916051°N 10.695710°E |
| Ankerhagen | 2 | 1921 / 1985 | Ruseløkka | Frogner | 59.913066°N 10.721056°E |
| Josefines park | 1 | * | Homansbyen | Frogner | 59.913066°N 10.721056°E |

- = reliable information lacking.

I addition is the river Akerselva with several smaller parks, among them Theodor Kittelsens plass (1917, 59.923288°N 10.726490°E) between Ankerbrua and Nybrua, Kuba (59.918337°N 10.758605°E) on Grünerløkka, Våghalsen (59.923883°N 10.753034°E), Heftyeløkka on Bjølsen.

In the inner city there are a few smaller parks, among them Arno Bergs plass (0,1 acres, 1932, 59.942258°N 10.766067°E), Dronning Astrids park (after 1995, 59.925813°N 10.723365°E), sentralparken and Gjenbruksparken in Pilestredet park (around 2000), Riddervolds plass (0,8 mål, established 1885, 59.912586°N 10.711082°E), Skillebekkparken (1869, 59.912586°N 10.711082°E), Sommerroparken (1870s, 59.914959°N 10.718937°E), Valkyrie plass (0.2 acres, 1929, 59.928389°N 10.717624°E).

Ladegårdshagen is a small garden designed symmetrically with ornate hedges in renaissance and baroque style. Freiaparken is a private, enclosed garden near the chocolate factory, in strictly regular forms, noted for the wealth of its flora and sculptures.

Of the 25 parks in the inner city that are 2.5 acres (10,000 m^{2}) or more, 19 are in the eastern section and aix in the western sector (in the Frogner and St. Hanshaugen sections).

=== Outer city ===
The major parks and green areas in the outer city are:

| Park | Decare | Year | Area | District |
|---|---|---|---|---|
| Ekeberg with Brannfjell, green fields and woods, Ekebergparken Sculpture Park | 1695 | | Ekeberg | Nordstrand |
| Alnaparken (Alnabru) | 200 | 2006 | Alna | |
| Nordre Skøyen Hovedgård | 135 | * | * | Østensjø |
| Korsvollparken | 87 | 1930 | Korsvoll | Nordre Aker |
| Østensjøområdet | 86 | 1930 | * | Østensjø |
| Svartdalsparken (nature park) | 83 | * | * | Gamle Oslo, Østensjø, Nordstrand |
| Holmendammen | 64 | * | * | Vestre Aker |
| Smestadparken | 49 | * | Smestad | Ullern |

Other parks in the outer city termed in the city's plan Grøntplan for Oslo, arranged after district (area, year constructed and size in brackets where known):

- Bydel Alna: Furusetparken (Furuset)
- Bydel Bjerke: Sverre Refstads plass (Risløkka), Veitvetparken (Veitvet), Økernparken (Økern, refurbished 2007), Årvollparken (Årvoll)
- Bydel Frogner: Bygdøy
- Bydel Grorud: Grorudparken (Grorud), Romsåsparken (Romsås)
- Bydel Nordre Aker: Harald Hals' park (Ullevål hageby, 11 decare), Kjelsåsparken (Kjelsås)
- Bydel Nordstrand: Nordseterparken
- Bydel Stovner: Stovnerparken (Stovner)
- Bydel Søndre Nordstrand: Hallagerjordet, Holmliaparken (Holmlia), Lofsrudparken, Stensrudparken
- Bydel Ullern: Vækerøparken
- Bydel Vestre Aker: Gaustadparken (Gaustad), Hovseterparken (Hovseter) Makrellbekken / Hoffselva
- Bydel Østensjø: Trasopparken.

Some of the old manor houses have gardens and parks that are open for public use: Søndre skøyen manor (1860s, private part, also called Den engelske park), Linderud manor, Bogstad, Frogner.
