= Torshovparken =

Park in Oslo, Norway

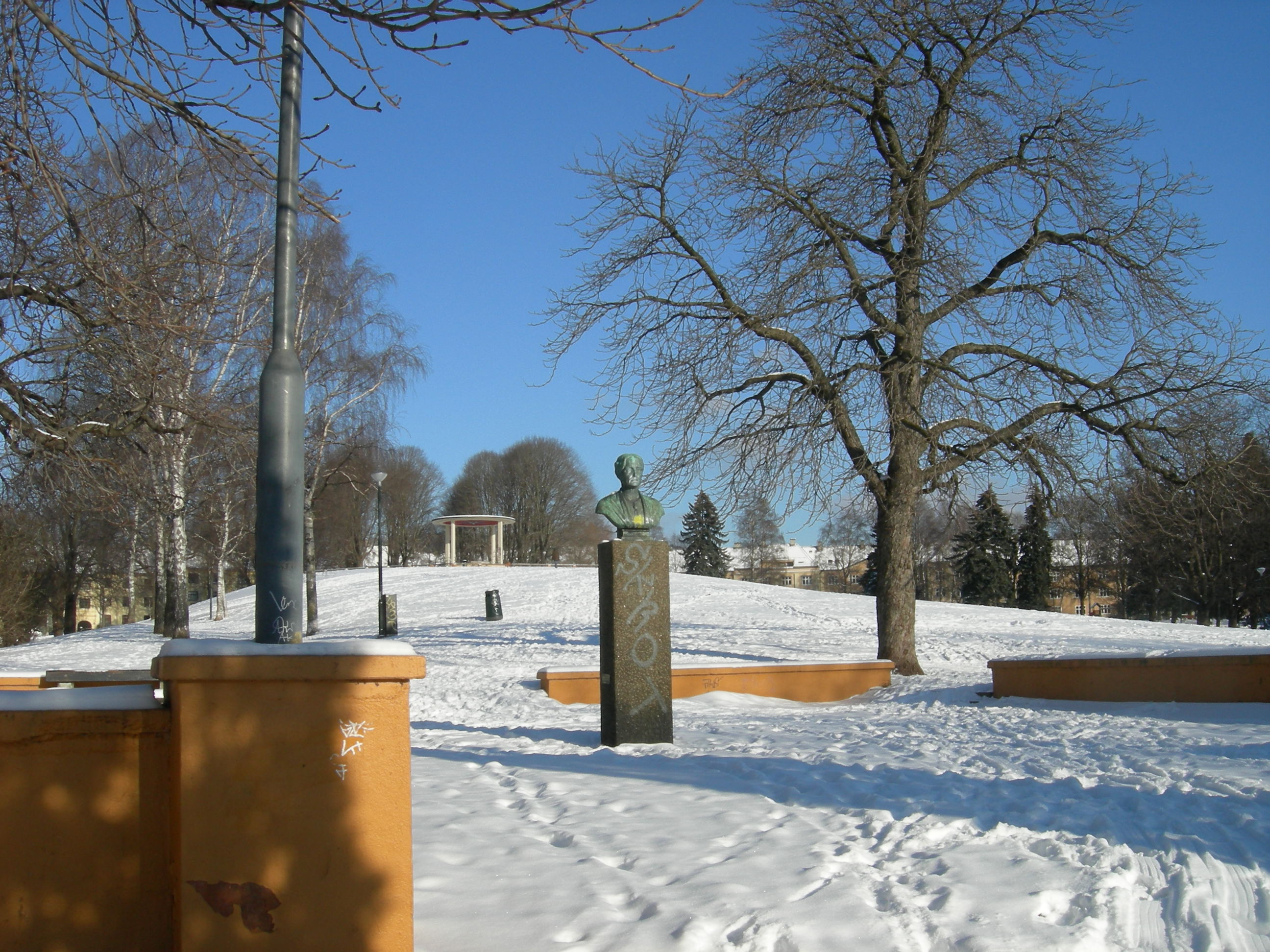
- Interactive map of Torshovparken
- Location: Oslo, Norway
- Coordinates: 59°56′07″N 10°46′15″E

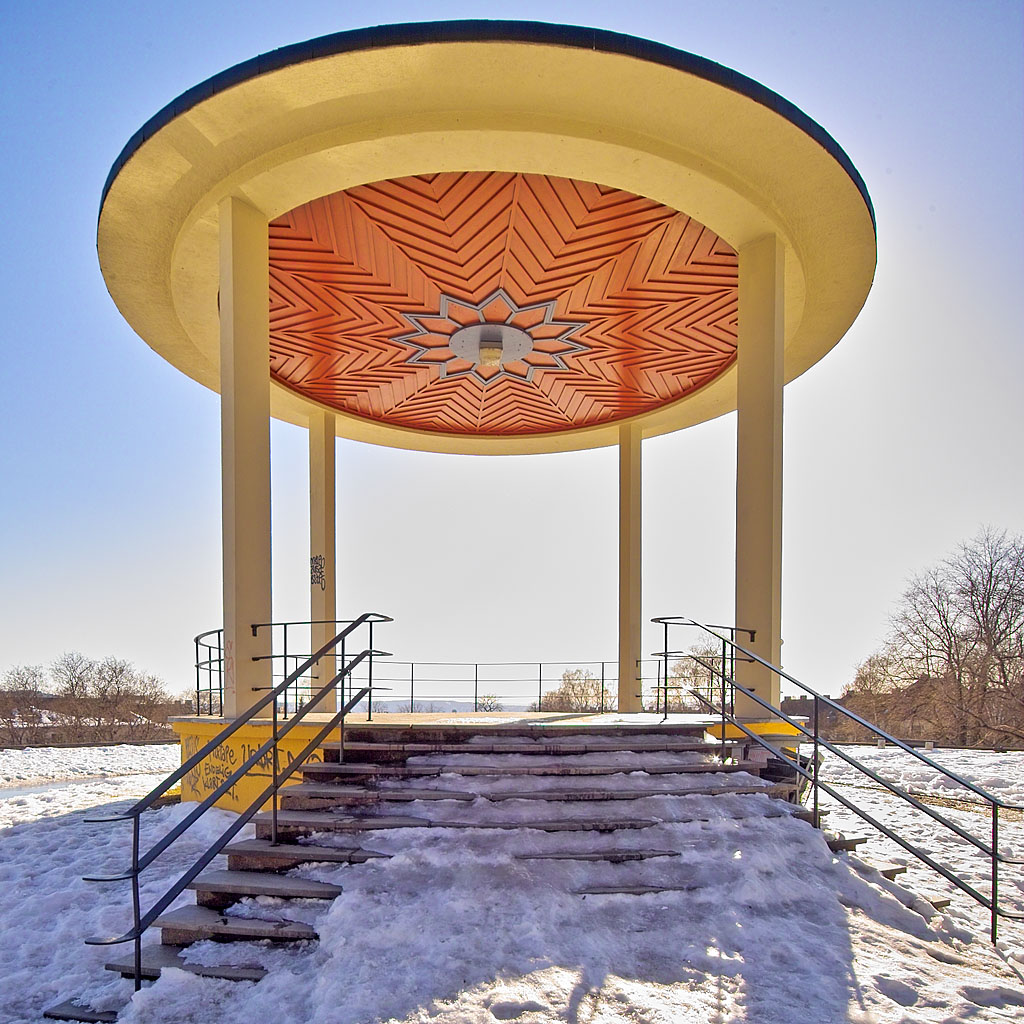
Bandstand in Torshovparken

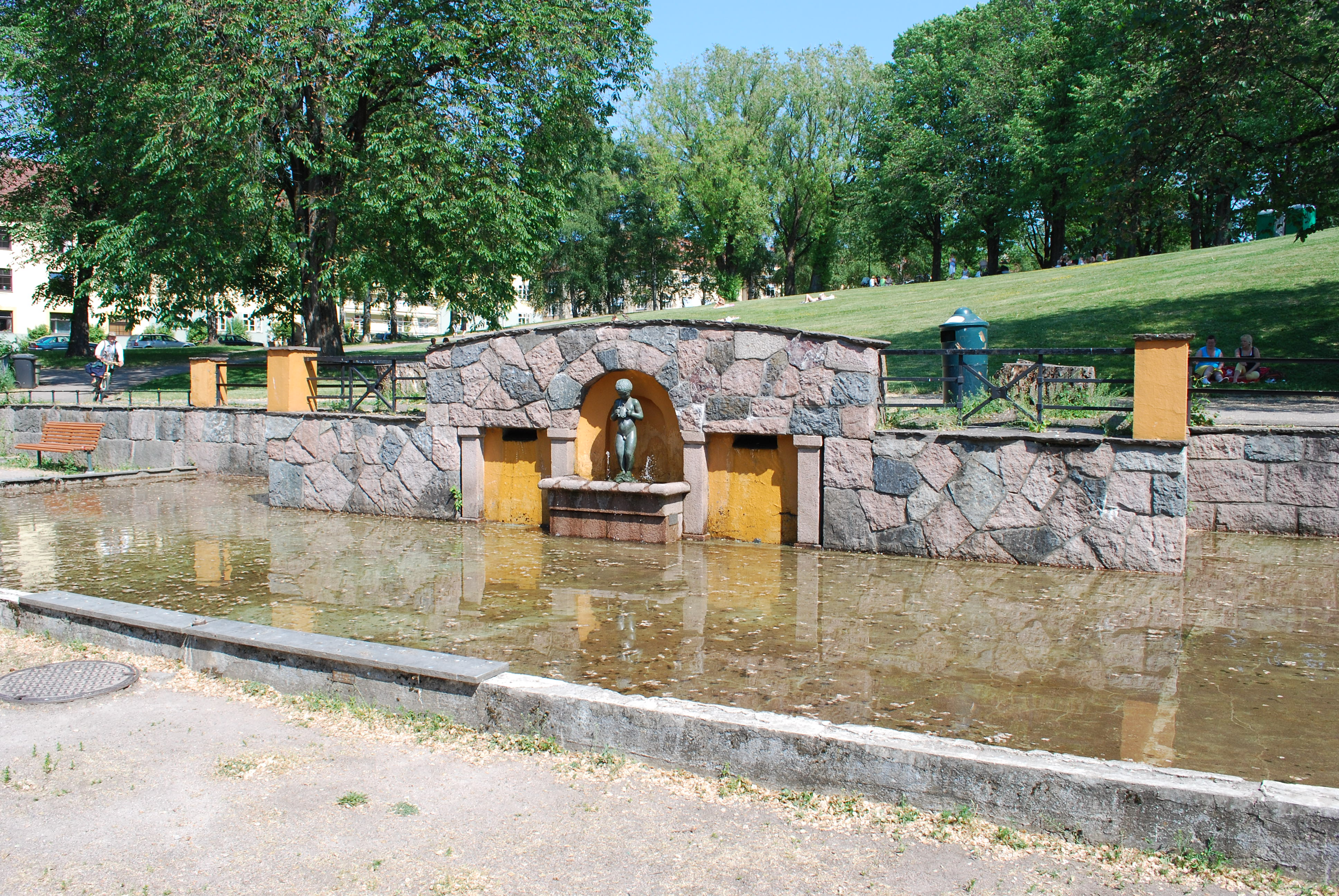
The pond

Torshovparken is a large park located in Torshov, Oslo, Norway, that was established in the 1920s as part of Torshovbyen, a residential area developed by the municipality.

== Park ==
The park is bordered by Agathe Grøndahl Street to the north, Johan Svendsen Street to the southeast, Hegermanns Street to the south, and Per Kvibergs Street to the west. The park is situated in the Sagene borough.

Torshovparken covers an area of 41 acres and is located on a natural elevation that was increased with excess soil from the construction. There is a view of the city and the fjord from the highest point (87 meters above sea level) in the middle of the park, where the music pavilion is situated at the end of an avenue facing north.

Torshovparken combines elements of both formal park style, characterized by symmetry and strict order, often with a music pavilion as the centerpiece, and functionalist park style, emphasizing simplicity, open grass areas, preservation of the original terrain, facilities for children and youth activities, and Nordic tree species.

The sloping areas to the south and east are intended for sledding and skiing. In the northern part of the park, there is a pond and a decommissioned children's park. The park and Lilleborgbanen, located south of the park, are frequently used by Lilleborg School, which is situated nearby.

During the summer season, the park hosts concerts by local school bands and others, including the Musikkfest Oslo festival and film screenings.

There are three sculptures in the park:

- A bust of Fernanda Nissen, the first chairperson of the park committee, created by Wilhelm Rasmussen and located in the southern part of the park. It was unveiled in 1931
- A children's sculpture, created by Sigri Welhaven, near the playground in the northwest corner of the park. It was unveiled in 1928.
- A bust of composer Jolly Kramer-Johansen, who lived his entire life in Torshov. It was created by his son Willy Kramer-Johansen and unveiled on May 1, 2002, in commemoration of his centenary.

== History ==
Torshovparken is located on the area the municipality purchased in 1916 to build Torshov City. City gardener Marius Røhne presented a plan for the park in 1924. This was the first park in the city that was established according to a comprehensive plan by the Park Authority, which was established in 1916.

In 1926, the Sagene and Torshov branches of the Labor Party initiated the erection of a bust of Fernanda Nissen in the park. The funds for the bust mostly came from concerts at St. Hanshaugen, where artists performed for free. The bust was unveiled when the park was officially opened on September 13, 1931.

In 1940, Torshovparken was used for growing food for the local population. From 1942, portions of the park were allocated as private allotments.

From 1946, the municipality organized park evenings with concerts in Torshovparken. In the summer of 2007, public toilets were installed in the park.

In 2006, the district council granted permission for restaurant operations at the pavilion. In the summer of 2012, a temporary structure with an accompanying outdoor seating area was erected. The structure was built close to the music pavilion and faced significant opposition from the local community. It sparked a rebellion against the establishment in Torshovparken. A Facebook group was created to advocate for the removal of the restaurant. The campaign received support from ICOMOS Norwegian Scientific Committee on Cultural Landscapes. The Oslo and Akershus chapter of the Norwegian Society for the Preservation of Ancient Monuments also sent a statement to the Sagene district (dated June 24, 2013). The building was demolished in the fall/winter of 2013.

== Literature ==
- Oslo City Encyclopedia
- Marius Røhne: "Oslo Municipal Parks and Green Spaces 1810-1948." Oslo, Myhres papirindustri, 1967
