= Klosterenga =

Park in Oslo municipality, Norway

Coordinates: 59.908351°N 10.775614°E

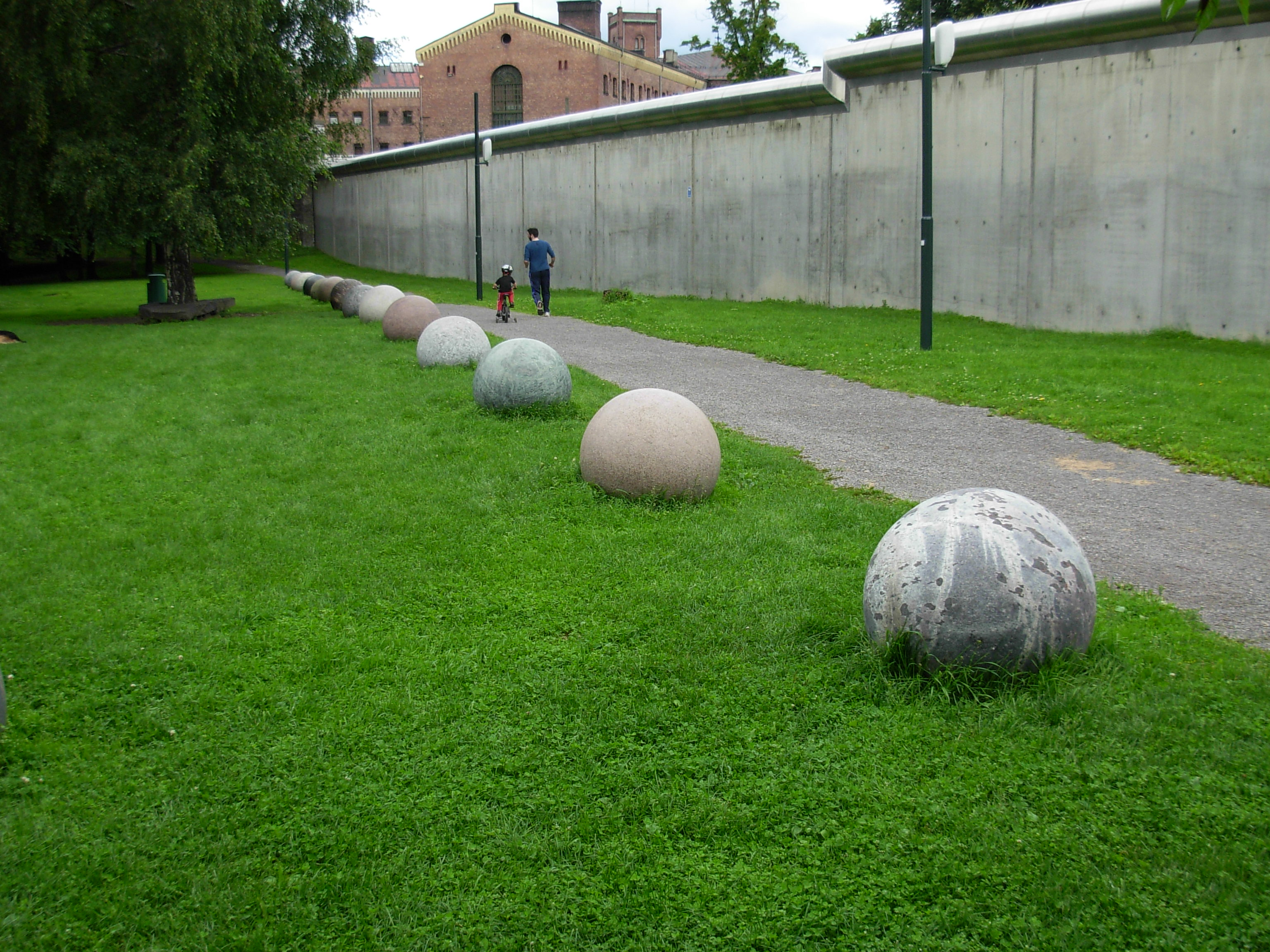
The prison wall and stones from the country's counties Credit: Helge Høifødt

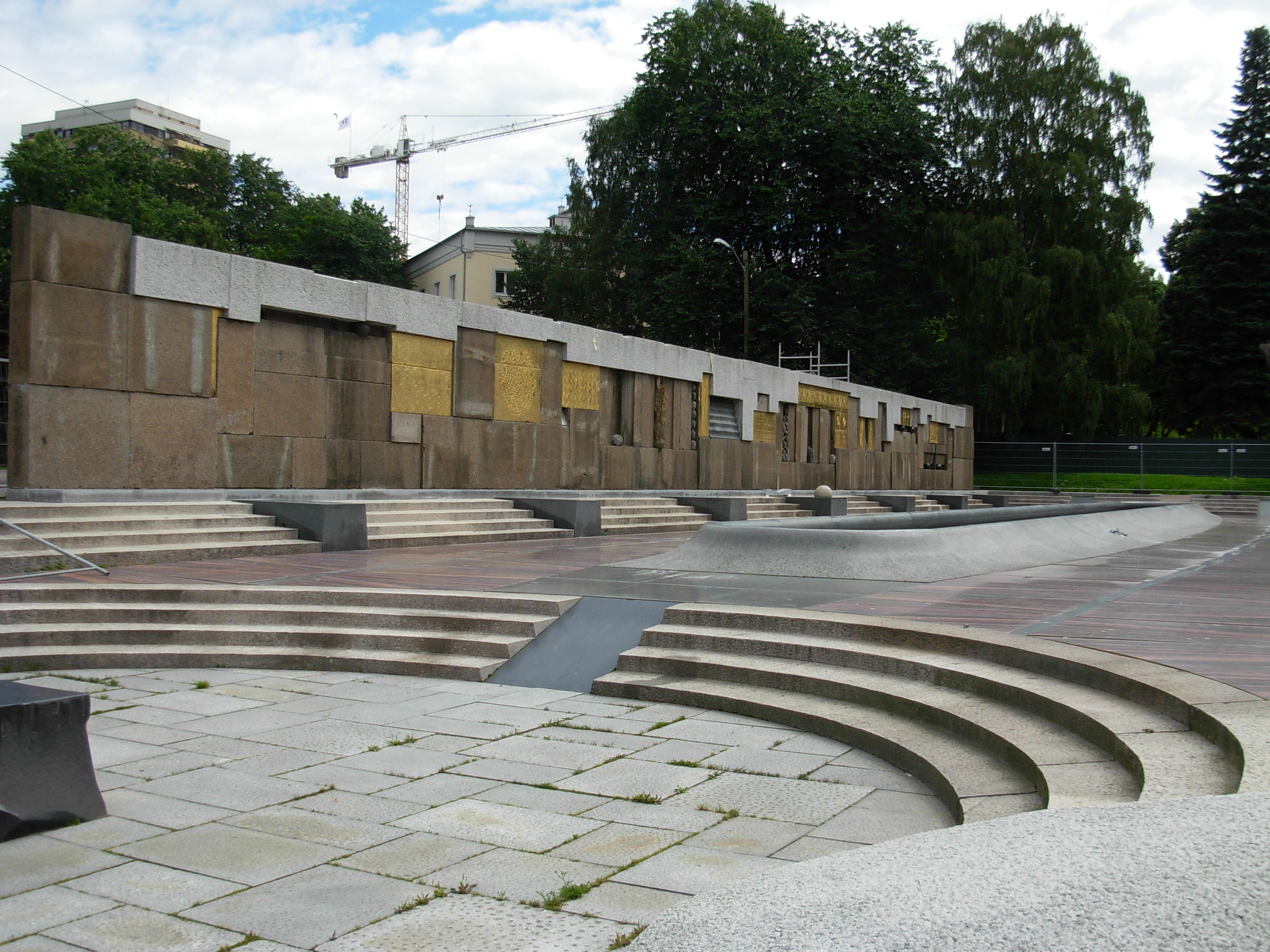
The multicultural space under renovation (2007) Credit: Helge Høifødt

Klosterenga or Klosterenga park is a park in Oslo, located in the transition between Old Town and Grønland. The park route extends up to Galgeberg. It was made as part of a housing project.

Klosterenga goes towards a northwest–southeast direction, almost 66 acres (27 ha). It is bordered by the wall around Oslo Prison in the north, Nonnegata and the homes north of Schweigaards gate in the south, Grønlands park – Botsparken in the west and Kjølberggata and Galgeberg in the east. Jarlegata runs through Klosterenga. In the east is a sports field.

Hovinbekken previously flowed through the park's area, and this is to be reopened through the park.

In 1999, the Klosterenga sculpture park was completed, with sculptures by Bård Breivik, including "Den flerkulturelle plass" with sculptures and a pool at the east end, where there is also a sports field. The sculpture park was refurbished in 2005–2007.

In October 2013, traces of medieval settlements were found in the park; it was previously unknown that people should have lived there at that time.
