= Kværnerparken =

Park in Oslo, Norway

Coordinates: 59°54′9.4968″N 10°47′34.703″E

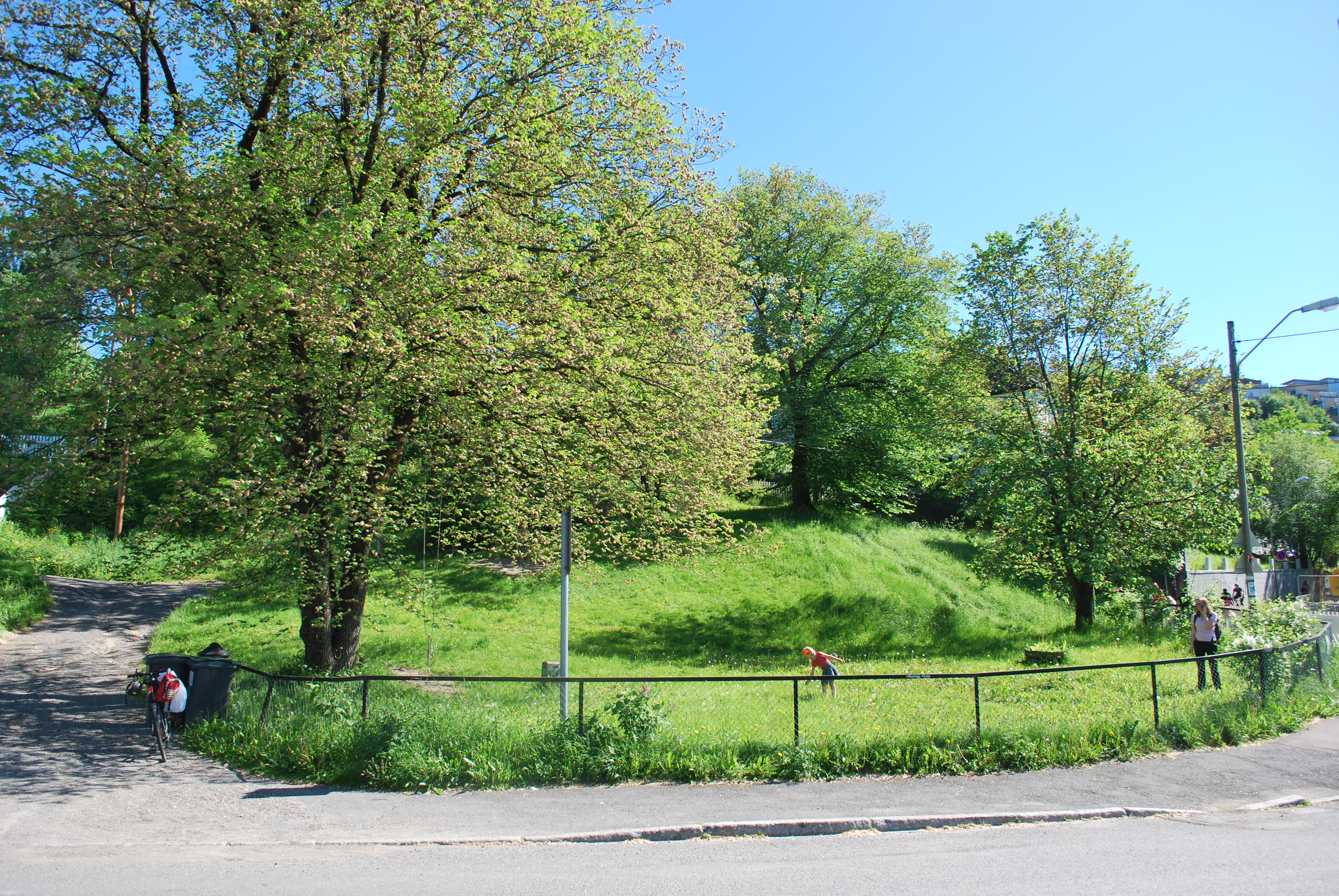
Kværnerparken

Kværnerparken is a park in the Kvaerner neighborhood of Oslo, Norway.

The park was established in 1922 with an area of 3.1 acres (1.3 hectares), It was upgraded in 1994 to 3.5 hectares (8.6 acres) at a cost of $250,000, as part of the redevelopment of Gamle Oslo in 1994. The name of a park was used for a new residential area in the vicinity, Kvaerner Dalen.
