= Fagerborg =

Neighborhood in Oslo, Norway

Coordinates: 59°55′55″N 10°43′42″E

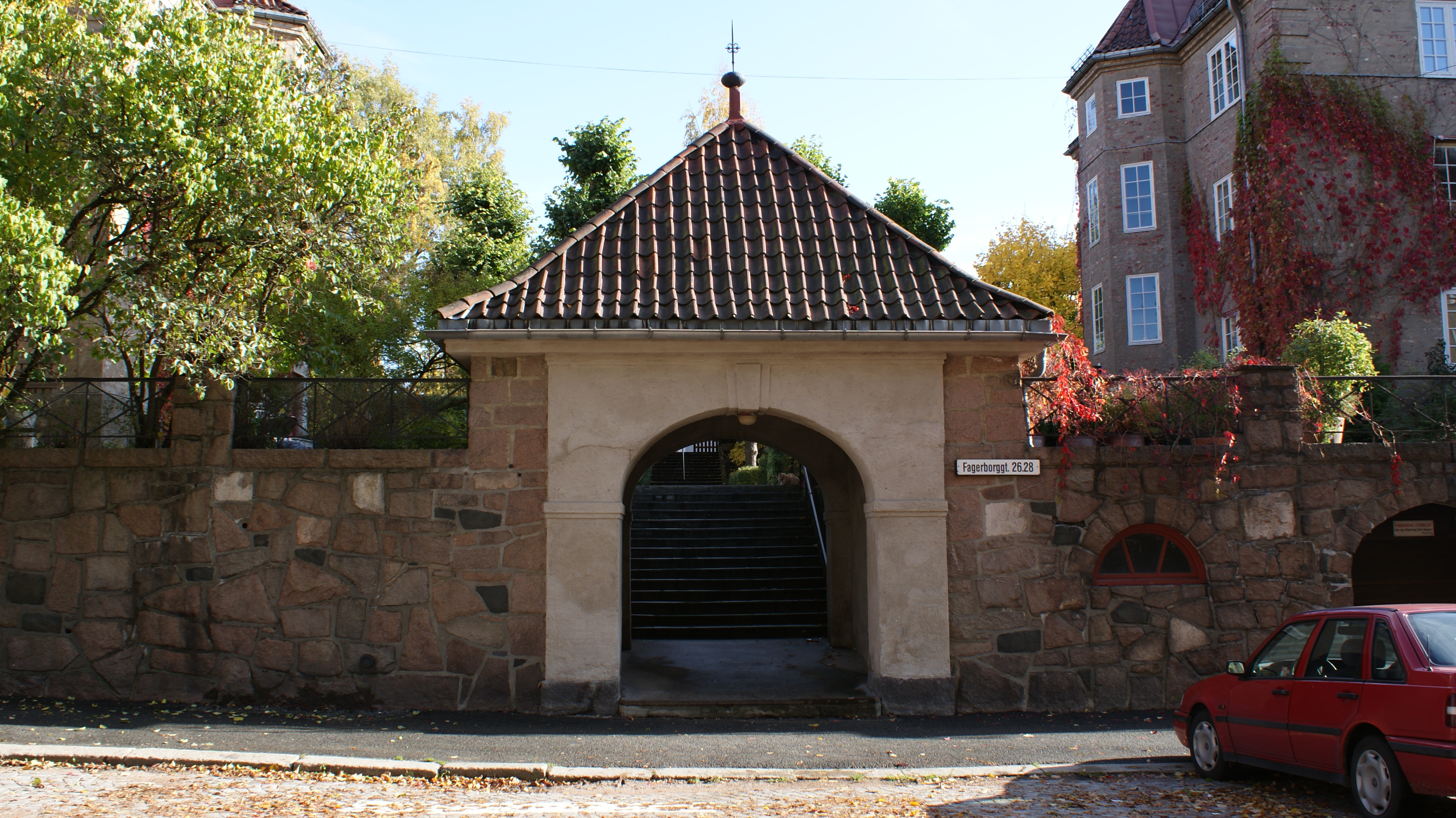
Hertzbergs gate, Fagerborg

Fagerborg is a neighbourhood in the St. Hanshaugen borough in Oslo, Norway. Located at the northwestern end of the borough, it is bounded by Majorstua in Frogner in the west, by Marienlyst in the north, by Adamstuen and Bolteløkka in the east, and by Bislett in the south.

== Architecture ==
The buildings are varied, and consist of a mixture of villas and row houses from the period 1880–1920, townhouses from the 1920s, a number of apartment buildings from the 1880-1890s and newer apartment buildings. The western part of the area is dominated by Jessenløkken, apartment buildings from the years 1919–1922 in the area of Suhm Street - Kirkeveien (Ring 2) - Gørbitz' street - Jacob Aall Street, and consists of a total of 37 apartment buildings, built in Scandinavian Neo-baroque.

== Park ==
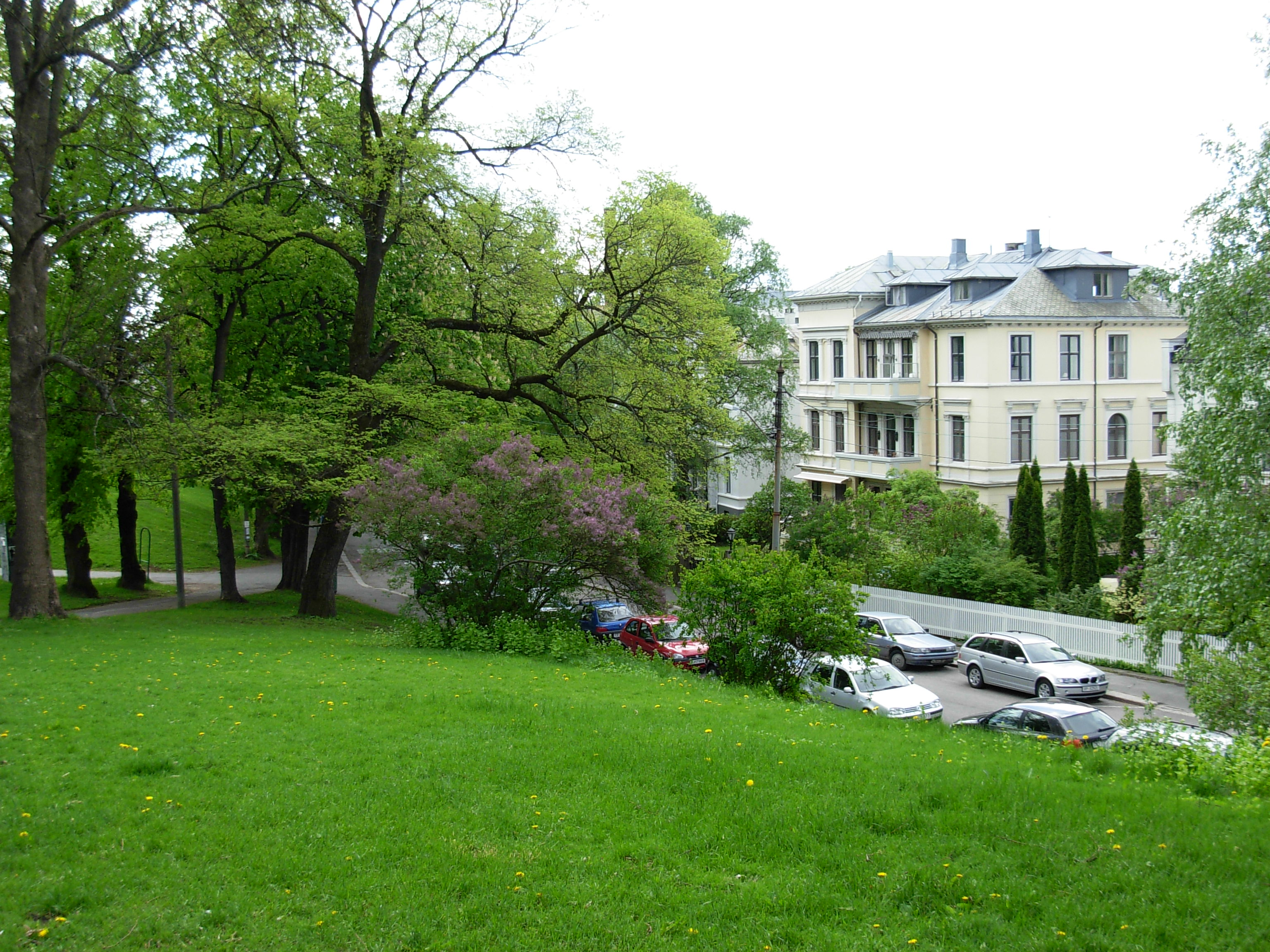
Stensparken seen towards the street Pilestredet

Stensparken is a grassy height in Fagerborg in St. Hanshaugen in Oslo. The height is elongated and the foundation consists of nodular limestone. The southern part of the hill is cultivated as a park, while the northern part (Blåsen) is a rock outcropping with great views over the city. The park was built from the 1890s to the 1940s.

== Church ==
Fagerborg Church is located far south of Stensparken. It was built in 1903 and belongs to Fagerborg parish. The church is in neo-gothic and the granite is from Skjeberg.

== Education ==
Fagerborg high school is one of the most popular schools in Oslo. Most of the students come from the western part of the city. There is a high school musical and a school newspaper. Several 20th-century Norwegian cultural figures have attended the school, including poets Rudolf Nilsen, Rolf Jacobsen, André Bjerke, Carl Keilhau, Paal Brekke, Kate Næss and Jan Erik Vold, or actor Henrik Holm.

Reiulf Ramstad Architects has been involved in designing a new kindergarten for Fagerborg Congregation in central Oslo. The kindergarten offers 2 units for children between 1-3 years old and 2 units for children between 3-6 years old. Gross building area is around 1200m2.
