= Fagerborg Church =

Coordinates: 59°55′37.98″N 10°43′46.51″E

- Fagerborg kirke
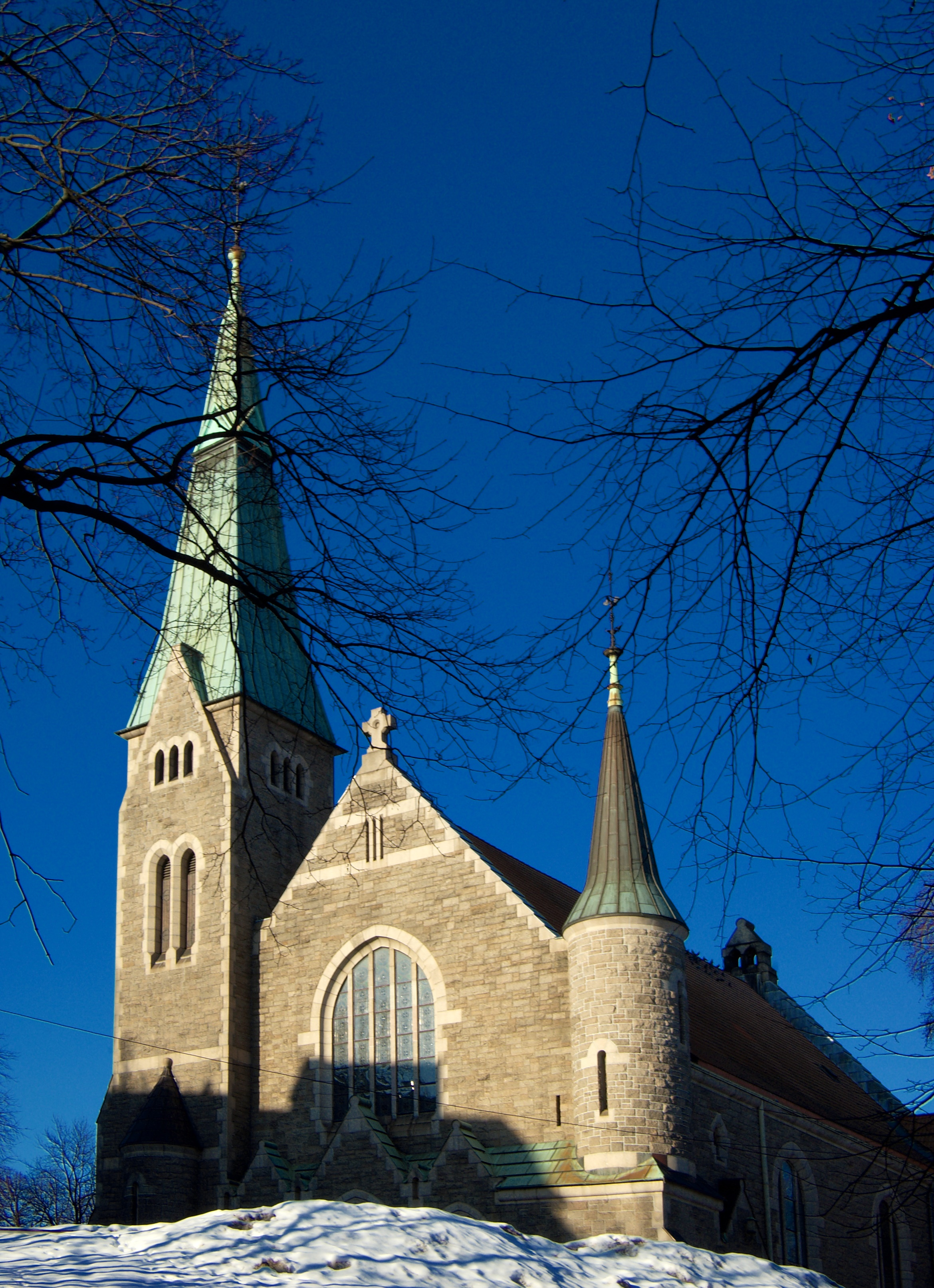

- Location within Oslo Location within Norway
- Location: Pilestredet 72, Oslo,
- Country: Norway
- Denomination: Church of Norway
- Churchmanship: Evangelical Lutheran
- Website: Website in Norwegian

History
- Status: Parish church
- Consecrated: 1901

Architecture
- Functional status: Active
- Architect: Hagbarth Schytte Martin-Berg
- Style: Neo-Gothic; Jugendstil
- Completed: 1903

Specifications
- Capacity: 480 seats
- Materials: Walled Granite from Skjeberg, Østfold County

Administration
- Diocese: Diocese of Oslo
- Parish: Fagerborg

Fagerborg Church (Fagerborg kirke) is located south of Stensparken at Fagerborg in Oslo, Norway.

== The building ==
Construction of the church began in 1901 and was completed in 1903. The church was consecrated on 22 December 1903 by Bishop Anton Christian Bang. The structure is a three-aisled church built of brick, with constructive joints made of quarried granite and has 480 seats. The church is in neo-Gothic style with elements of Jugendstil and built in granite from Skjeberg. The church was redecorated inside for the 50th anniversary in 1953. On this occasion, the church received new chandeliers designed by architect Harald Hille.

The church is built to a design by architect Hagbarth Martin Schytte-Berg (1860–1944), after a competition in which 54 entries were submitted. The style church is the result of Art Nouveau treatment of the historic eclecticism. The basic features are derived from the Neo-Romanesque and neo-Gothic, but filtered through the Jugendstil styled shapes and materials. Church doors are executed in a national romantic medieval-inspired style

== Interior ==
The pulpit and altar are both designed by the church architect.

Stained glass is made of imperial and royal court stained glass artist Max Roth from the studio Miksa Roth in Budapest, Hungary, with Art Nouveau features.

Pulpit is also Art Nouveau style and made of American Oregon pine. It is decorated with carvings from drawing by Schytte-Berg. The font is in white marble, has an octagonal base and is in neo-Romanesque style.

The altarpiece was designed by the architect and executed by sculptor Jo Visdalen (1861–1923). The altarpiece has over the years undergone a number of changes.

=== Church organs ===
The old church organ at the side of the choir was completed in 1903. The church received a new organ in 1932 consisting of 2728 pipes. In 2007 a newer organ was dedicated. The new organ was built by Orgelbau Goll based in Lucerne. The organ has 54 voices and is among the largest in Oslo.
