= Torshov =

Neighborhood in Oslo, Norway

Coordinates: 59°56′1.43″N 10°45′51.19″E

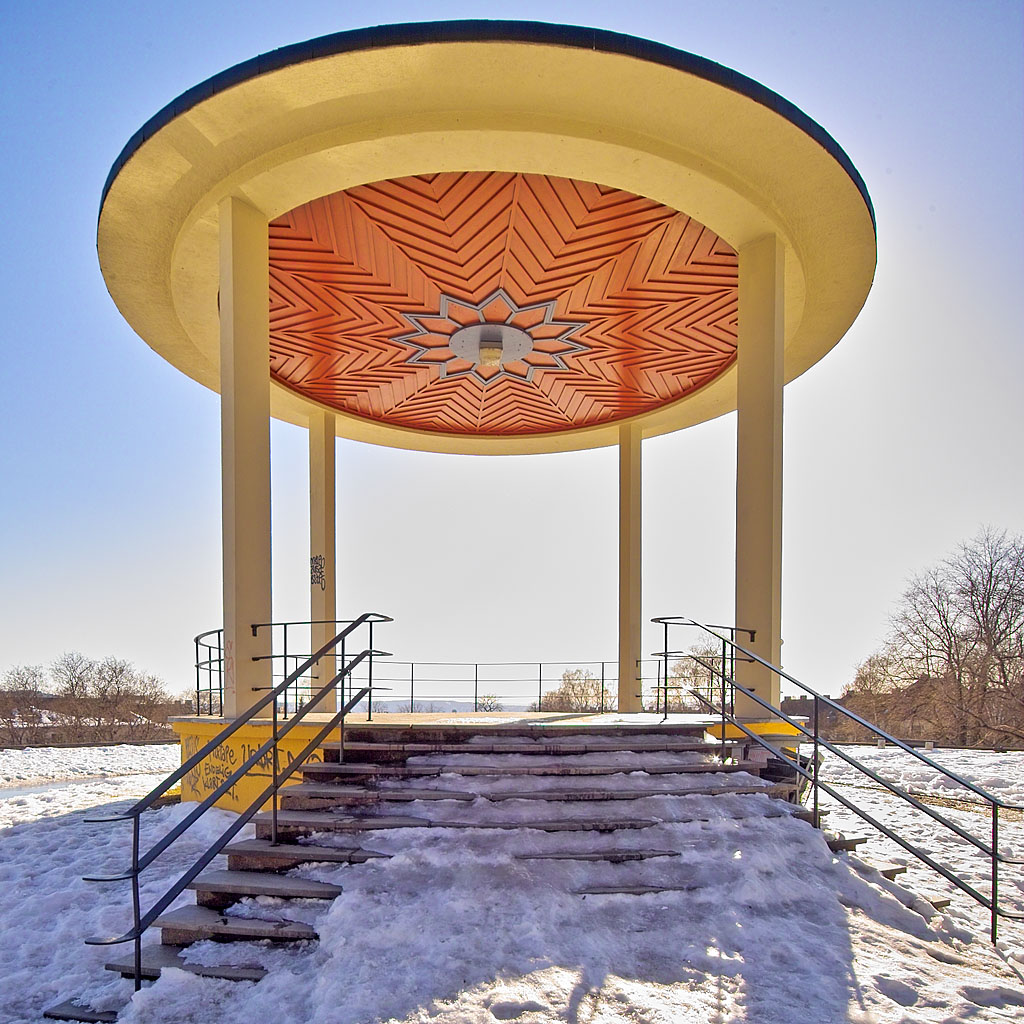
Music pavilion in Torshovparken

Torshov is a neighborhood north of Grünerløkka in the Sagene borough of Oslo, Norway. The Oslo Tramway (Trikken i Oslo) provides connections with lines running between Majorstuen and Kjelsås. Vogts gate serves as the main street of the neighborhood. Along Vogts gate are several coffee shops, restaurants and cafes. The Torshov public school was built in 1878. Torshov was separated from Sagene as a separate congregation in 1930. The local sports club is Skeid Fotball.

== Torshov Church ==
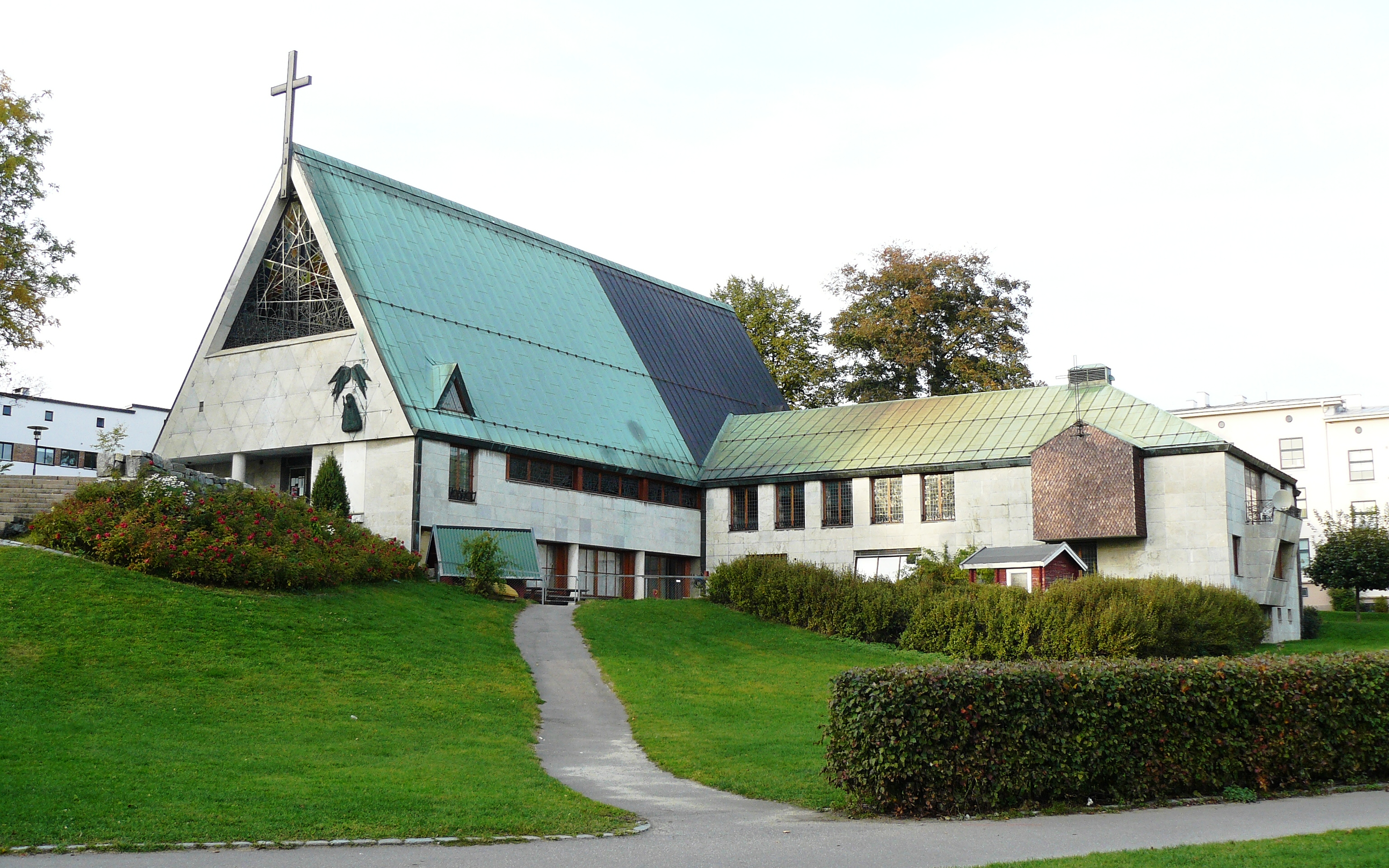
Torshov Church

Torshov church (Torshov kirke) was consecrated in 1958. The church is located in Torshov kirkepark, between Åsengata and Nordkappgata. The building was built of stone and wood with copper plates, and has 400 seats. The church was designed by the architects Ulf Nyquist and Per Sunde, while the interior decorations were designed by Frithjof Tidemand-Johannessen.

== Etymology ==
The area is named after an old farm, Torshov gård (Old Norse Þórshof). The first element is the genitive of Þórr 'Thor', and the last element is hof 'shrine, temple'. Torshov is a relatively common farm name in Norway. Farms with the name are also found in Enebakk, Gjerdrum, Jevnaker, Lørenskog, Løten, Sigdal, Torsnes, Trøgstad, and Vang.
