= Marius Røhne =

Norwegian landscape architect

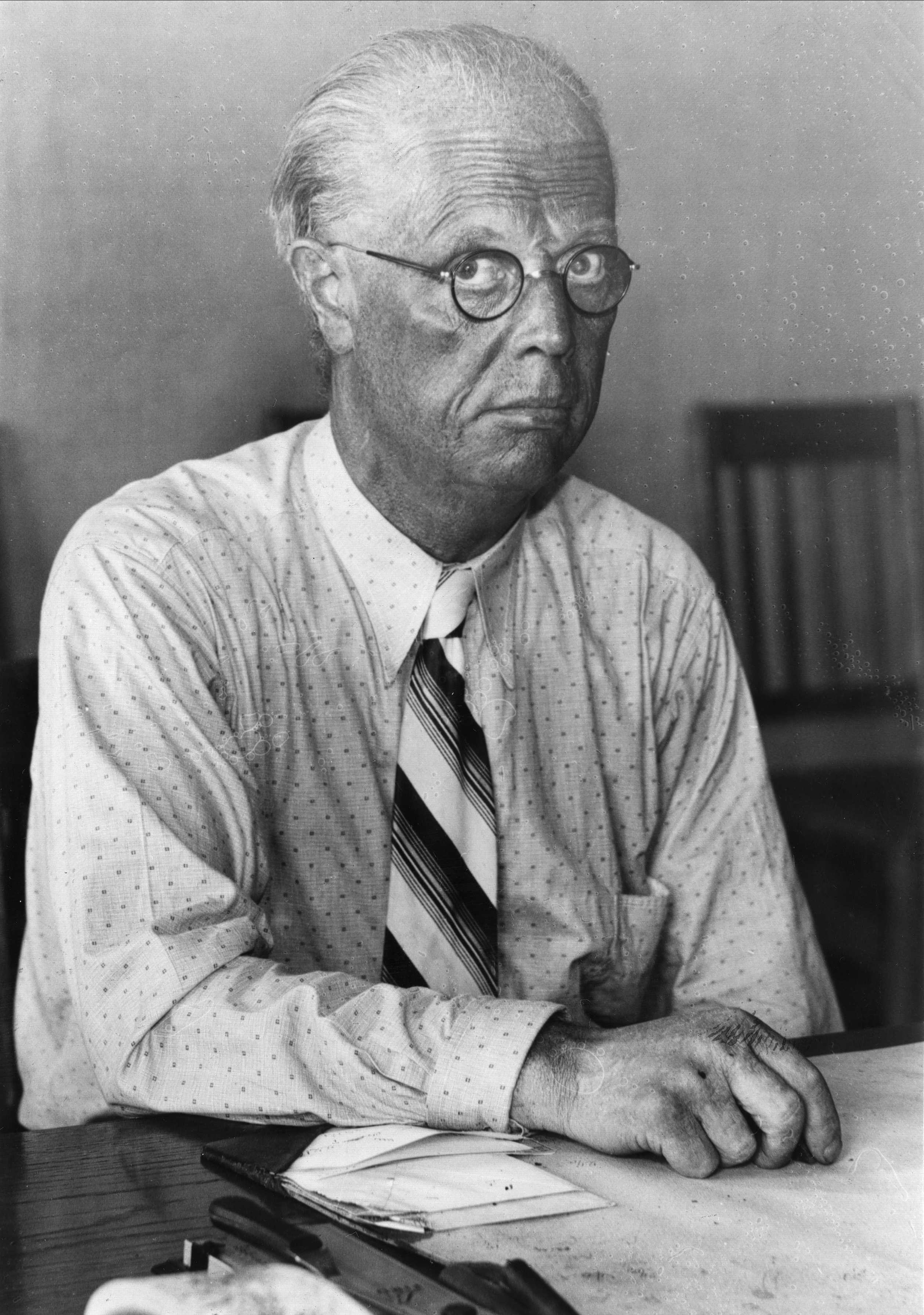
- Born: 25 April 1883; Løten, Norway
- Died: 30 August 1966 (aged 83); Oslo
- Occupation: landscape architect
- Awards: King's Medal of Merit in gold (1951); Medal of St. Hallvard (1958)

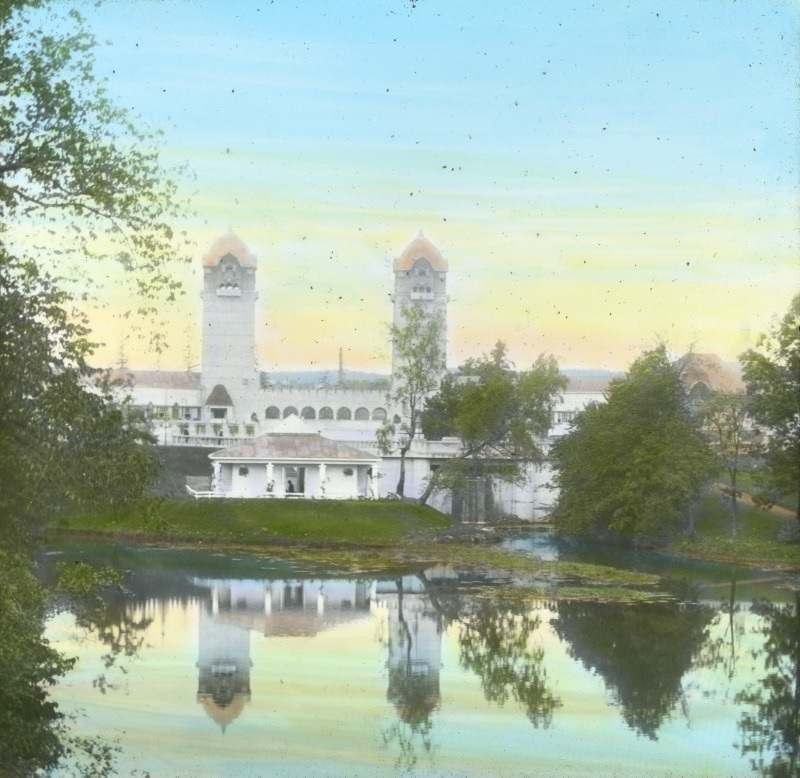
Frognerdammen. Hand-colored photograph from the 1914 Jubilee Exhibition

Marius Røhne (25 April 1883 – 30 August 1966) was a Norwegian landscape architect.

== Personal life ==
Røhne was born in Løten Municipality to farmer Mons Røhne and Inger Marie Jakobsdatter Helseth. He was married twice, first to Ingeborg Marie Gundestrup, and second to Astri Alfrida Mathilde Viddal.

== Career ==
Røhne graduated as cand.hort. from the Norges Landbrukshøgskole (NLH) in 1911. He practiced as garden architect in Kristiania from 1913, and was partly responsible for planning the park areas for the 1914 Jubilee Exhibition at Frogner. From 1916 to 1948 he was appointed city gardener and leader of the Park Authority in Oslo. Røhne co-founded Norsk Gartnerforening in 1910, and was a co-founder of the trade union Norsk Hagearkitektlag in 1929 (later Norske landskapsarkitekters forening).

Røhne was awarded the King's Medal of Merit in gold in 1951, and the Medal of St. Hallvard in 1958. He died in Oslo in 1966.
