= Olaf Ryes plass =

Park in Grünerløkka, Oslo, Norway

Coordinates: 59°55′22″N 10°45′30″E

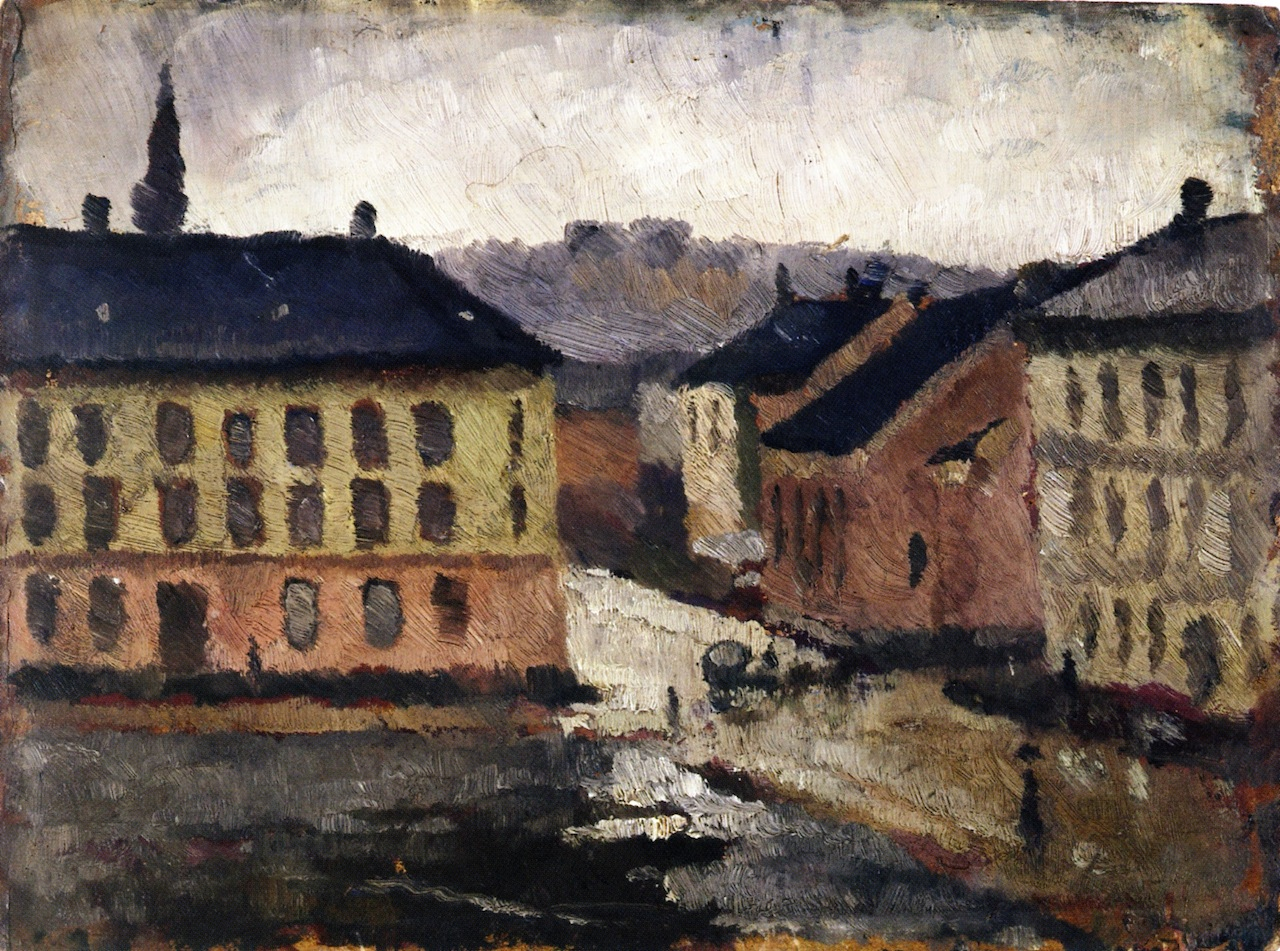
Olaf Ryes plass towards South East, painted by the famous painter Edvard Munch

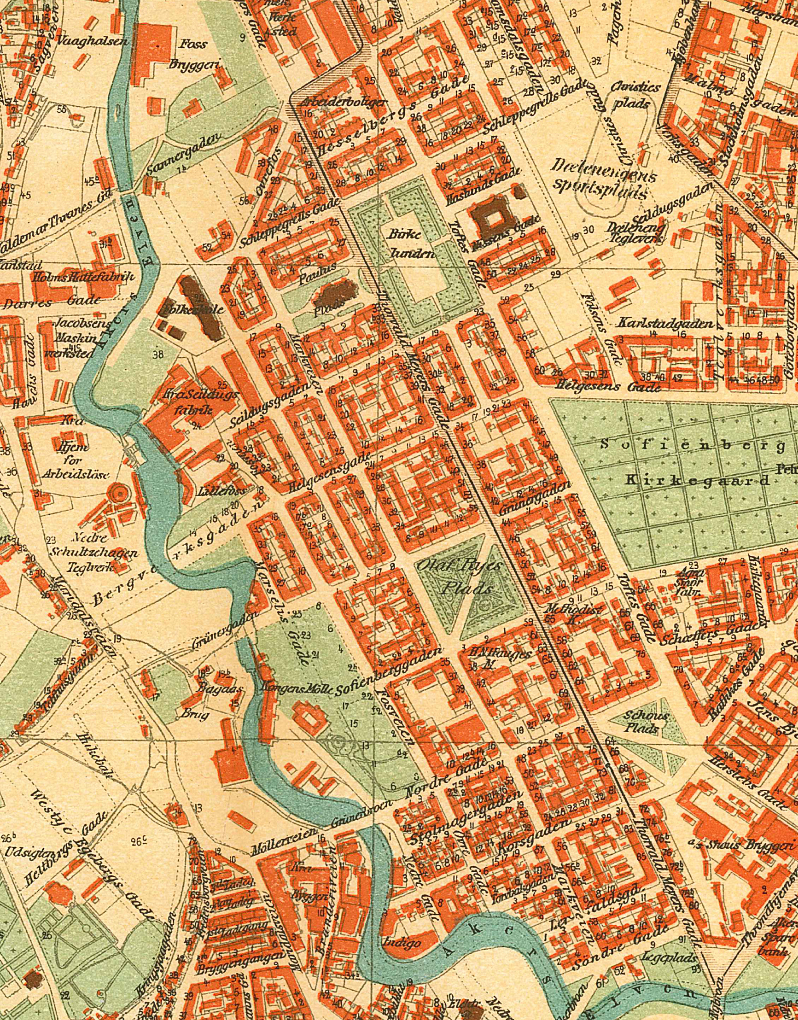
Map of the district, 1917. Olaf Ryes plass is the green central square.

Olaf Ryes plass ("Olaf Rye's Square") is a square and park placed centrally in the Grünerløkka borough of Oslo, Norway. It is more or less square in shape.

== History ==
The area belonged to the municipality of Aker until 1858, when it was incorporated into Christiania (Oslo). It was an open area which was bought by the municipality from Thorvald Meyer in 1863. In 1864 it received its name; the namesake was the military leader Olaf Rye. It was made into a park in 1890. The park has a bust monument of Eilert Sundt, raised in 1892, and a fountain was added some years later. Other major parks in the area are Birkelunden, Sofienberg Park, and Tøyen Park.

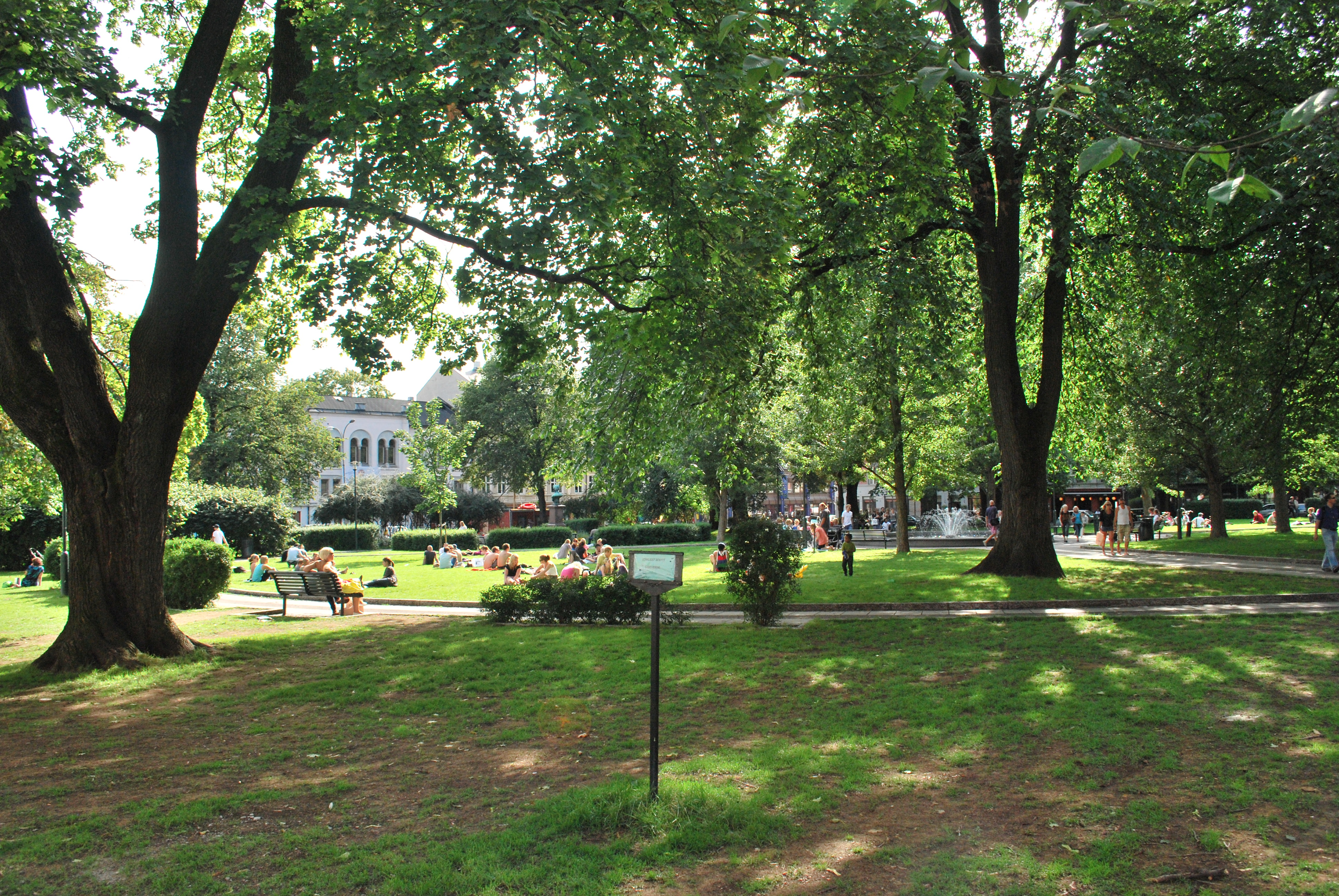
Part of the park

The park is surrounded by four streets as well as housing three and four storeys tall, mostly built in the 1870s, 1880s, and 1890s. The three-storey housing was built first. Among the most notable inhabitants of these buildings were the young Edvard Munch from 1882 to 1883.

Already in 1875 Johan Cordt Harmens Storjohann took the initiative to raise a gospel hall adjacent to the park; it was converted to a school in 1880, a church between 1917 and 1938, and later a women's hostel until 1985. The building is called Hauges Minde, named after lay preacher Hans Nielsen Hauge. In 1907 the stage theatre Grünerløkkens Folketheater was opened in a building adjacent to the park, renamed Grünerløkkens Verdenstheater five years later. The theatre was reconstructed and expanded in the years 1918–1922; upon the reopening it had its name changed to Parkteatret. In 1932, the building was adorned by the architect Paul Ansteinsson. From 1926 to 1991 that building also featured a movie theatre.

== Transport ==
The Olaf Ryes plass tram stop on the Grünerløkka–Torshov Line of the Oslo Tramway serves the park. It is served by lines 11, 12, and 18. The park is not served directly by bus.
