= St. Hanshaugen Park =

Large public park

Coordinates: 59°55′36.28″N 10°44′27.38″E

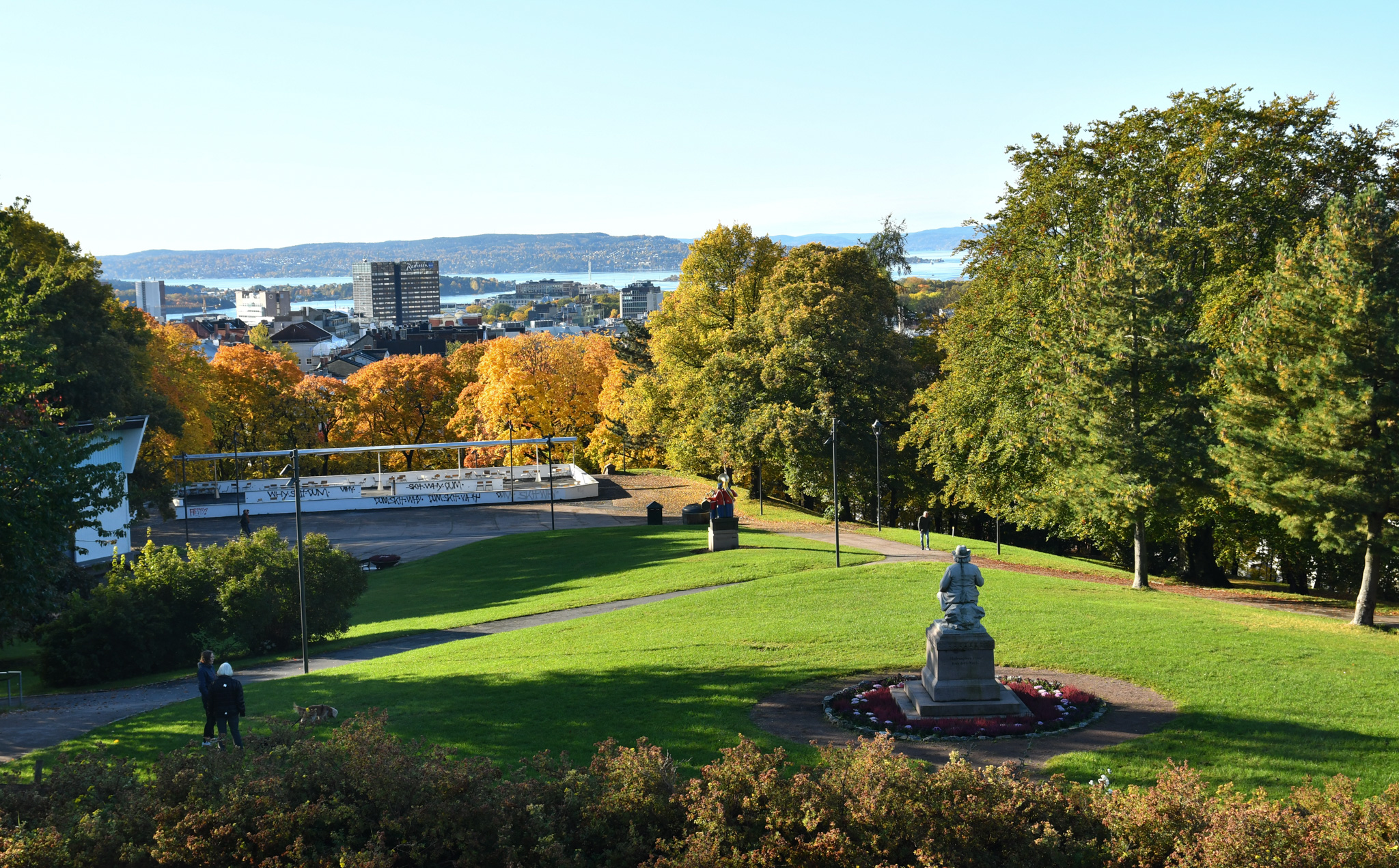
St. Hanshaugen Park in Oslo

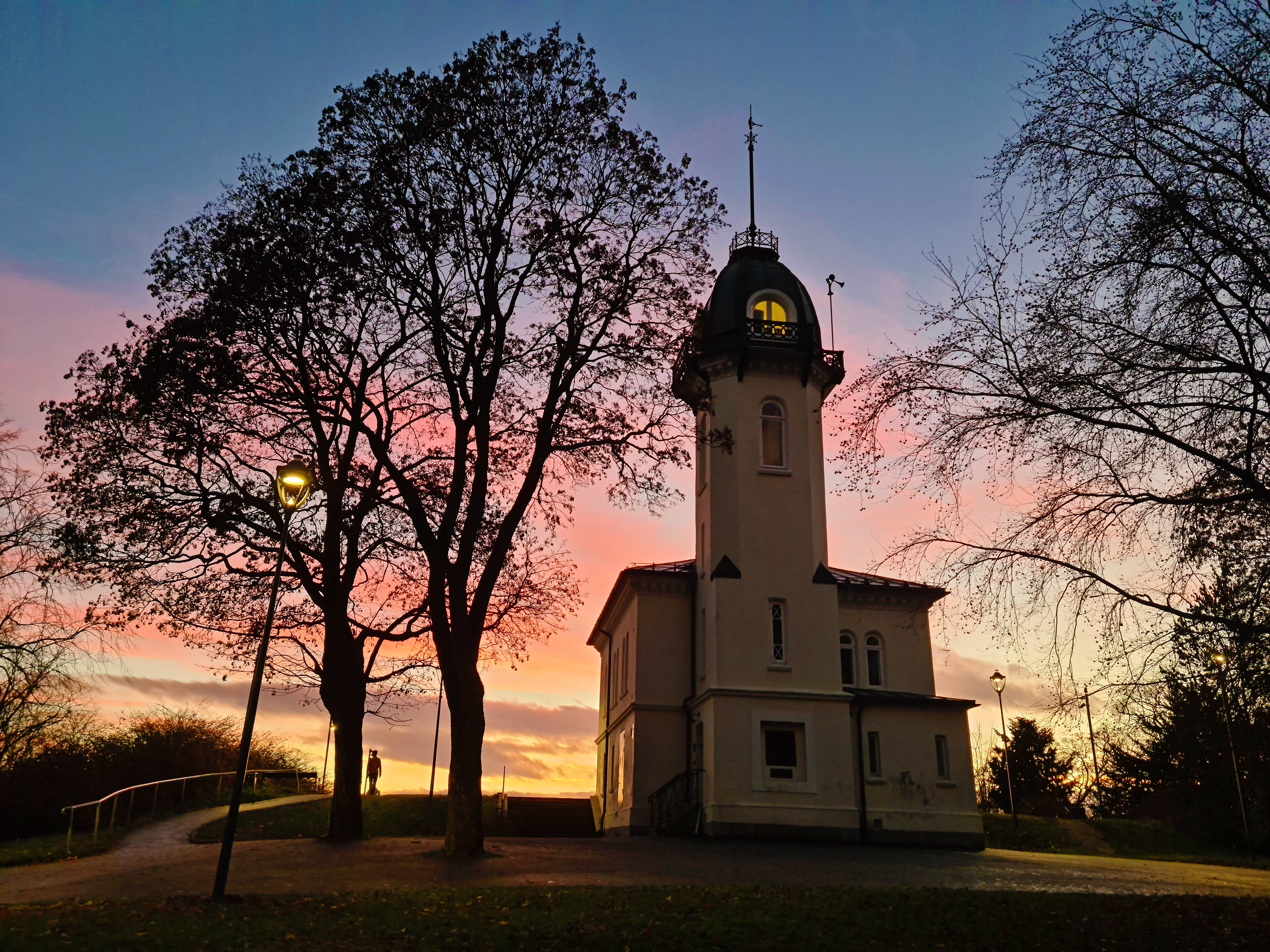
The Tower House (Tårnhuset) at St. Hanshaugen Park

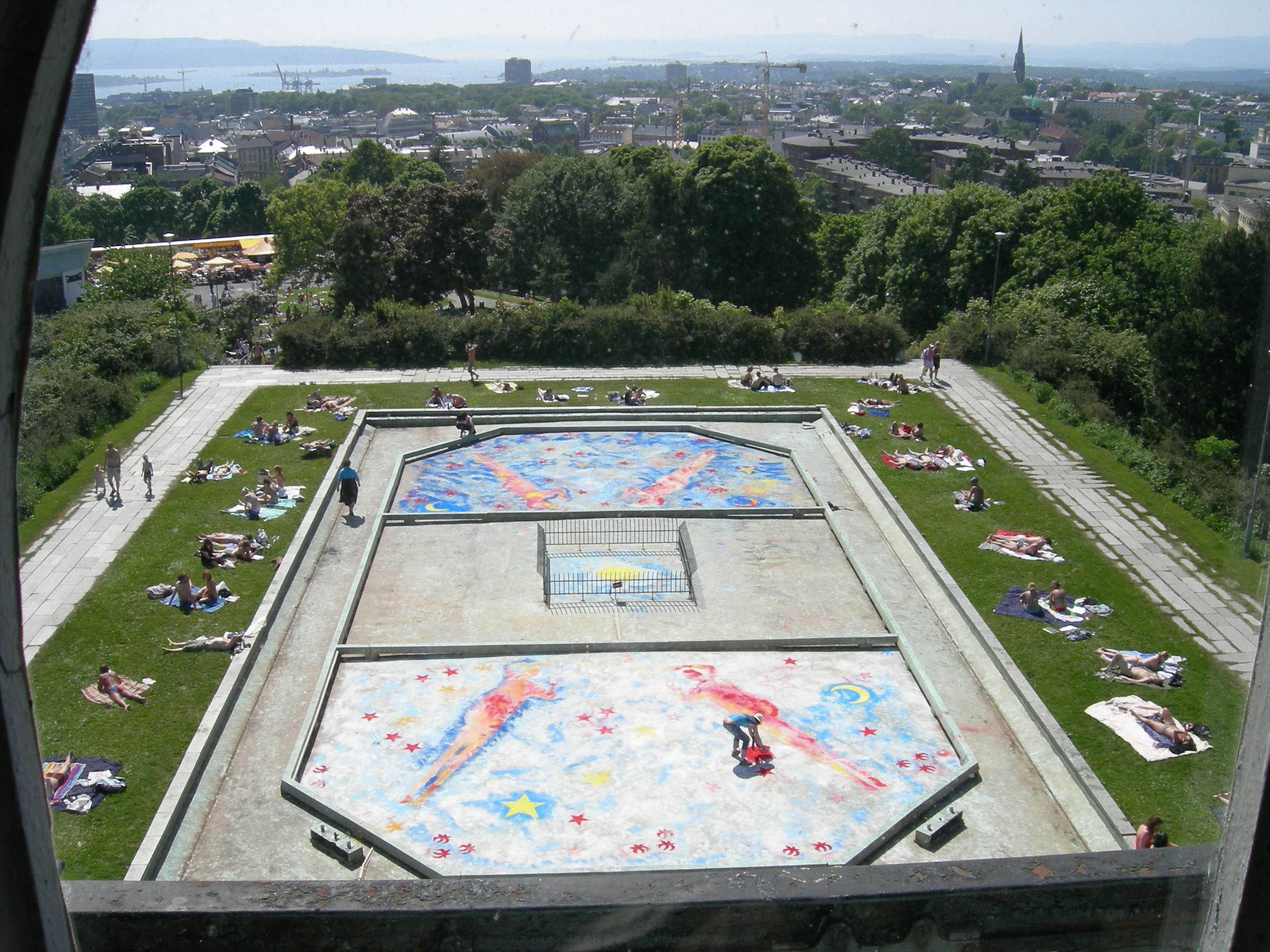
View from top of St. Hanshaugen Park

St. Hanshaugen Park is a large public park located just north of the city center of Oslo, Norway. It is a classic urban park located within the borough of St. Hanshaugen, which was named for the park which lies within its center. St. Hanshaugen Park is situated between Geitmyrsveien, Colletts gate, Ullevålsveien and Knud Knudsens plass. Nearby are Bislett Stadium and Alexander Kiellands plass.

== Description ==
St. Hanshaugen Park has a mixture of intimate and romantic areas together with rolling hills which provide picturesque and scenic views to downtown Oslo. The park has a reflecting pool covering a reservoir. Through the years, a number of statues were also placed in the park. The park also has a groundskeepers house, an artificial creek and a pavilion on the square Festplassen. St. Hanshaugen Park has a stage used for outdoor concerts and entertainment which is quite popular. St. Hanshaugen Park is also the site of Kongene på Haugen festivalen, an annual local music festival.

== History ==
The park location was originally a bare rock hill. During the 1840s, inhabitants of Oslo began to use the site of the future park as location for their Midsummer Eve bonfire. St. Hans is a Norwegian term for Midsummer Eve while haugen (from Old Norse haugr) refers to a hill.

Fritz Heinrich Frølich (1807-1877) first initiated development of St. Hanshaugen Park around 1850. Frølich was a successful banker who served as director of Christiania Bank. He was a key figure in the business and community life of Christiania (now Oslo) during the mid 1800s. From 1843 until his death, Frølich was also a prominent member of the city council.

During the middle of the 1860s, over one thousand trees were planted creating the first major park outside the city center. Starting in 1867, the city took responsibility for the park and the last major works were carried out in the years 1876–1890. The final part of the park was added with purchases of land in 1909.

== Notable Statues ==
- Peter Chr. Asbjørnsen by Brynjulf Bergslien (1885)
- Kvinne by Ørnulf Bast (1947)
- Musikanter by Arne Vinje Gunnerud (1970)
- Svane by Arne Durban (1981)
- Løvinne med unger by H. Stuetzer (1891)

== Gallery ==
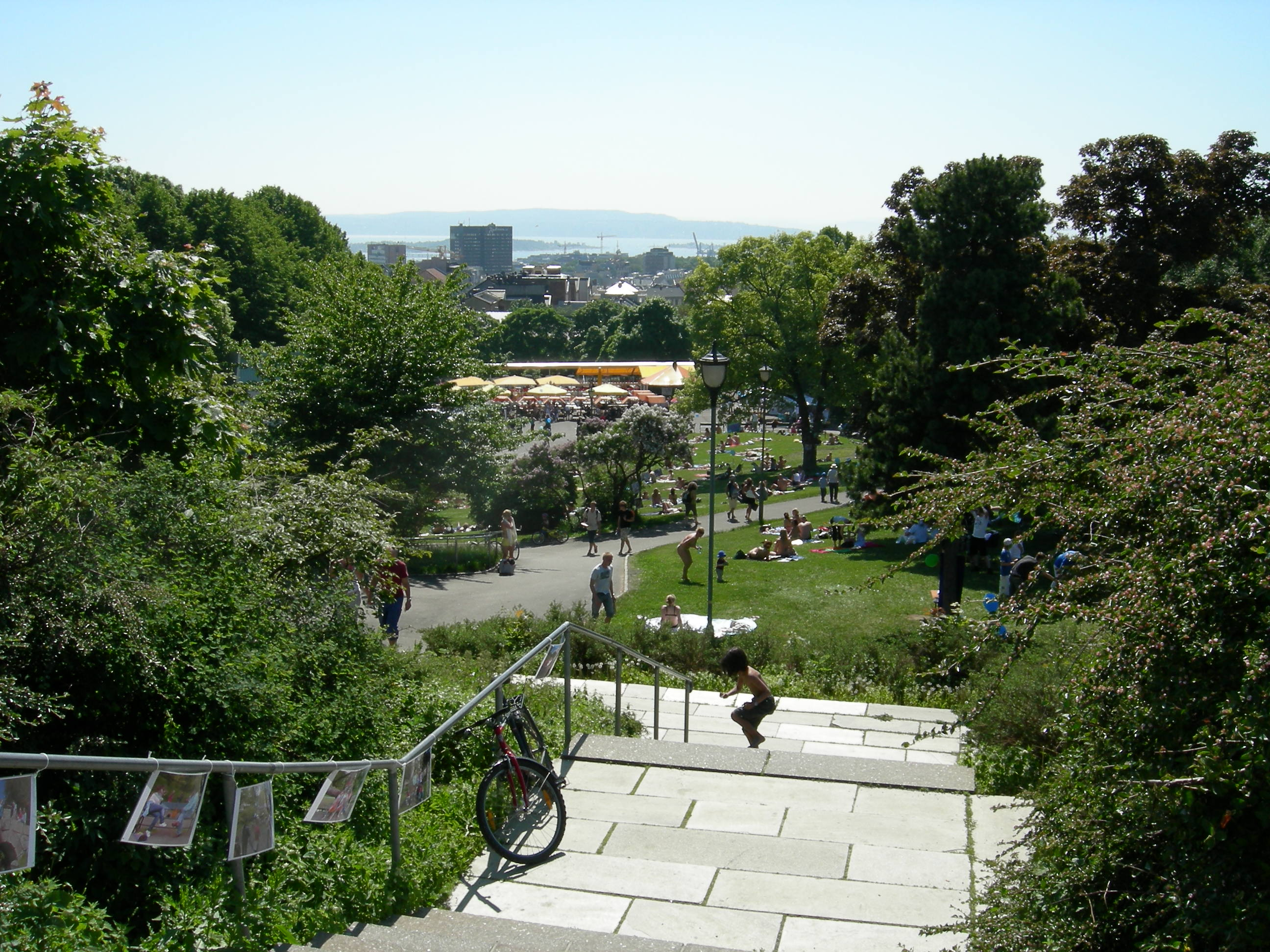
Stairs from the top of St. Hanshaugen Park

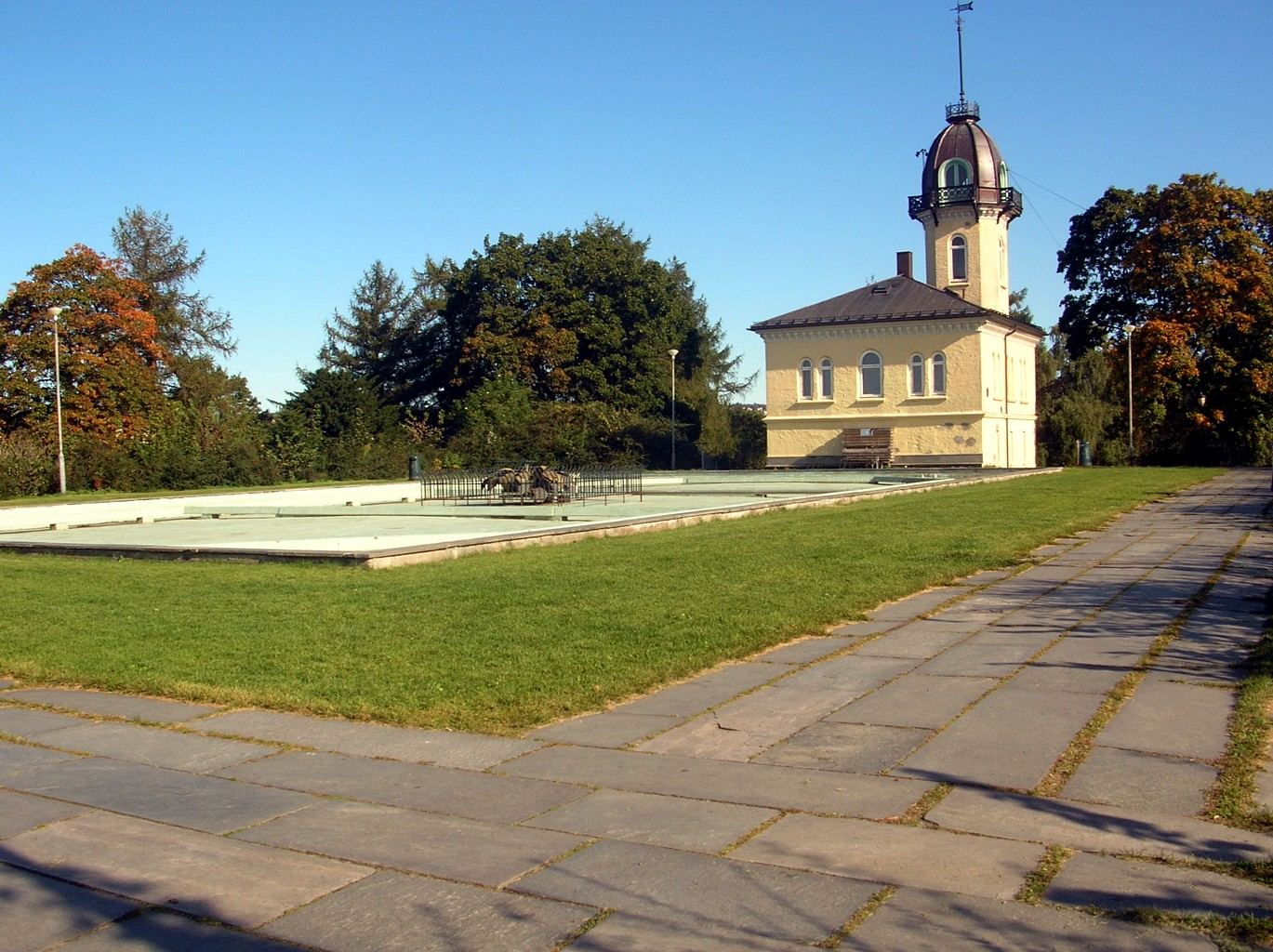

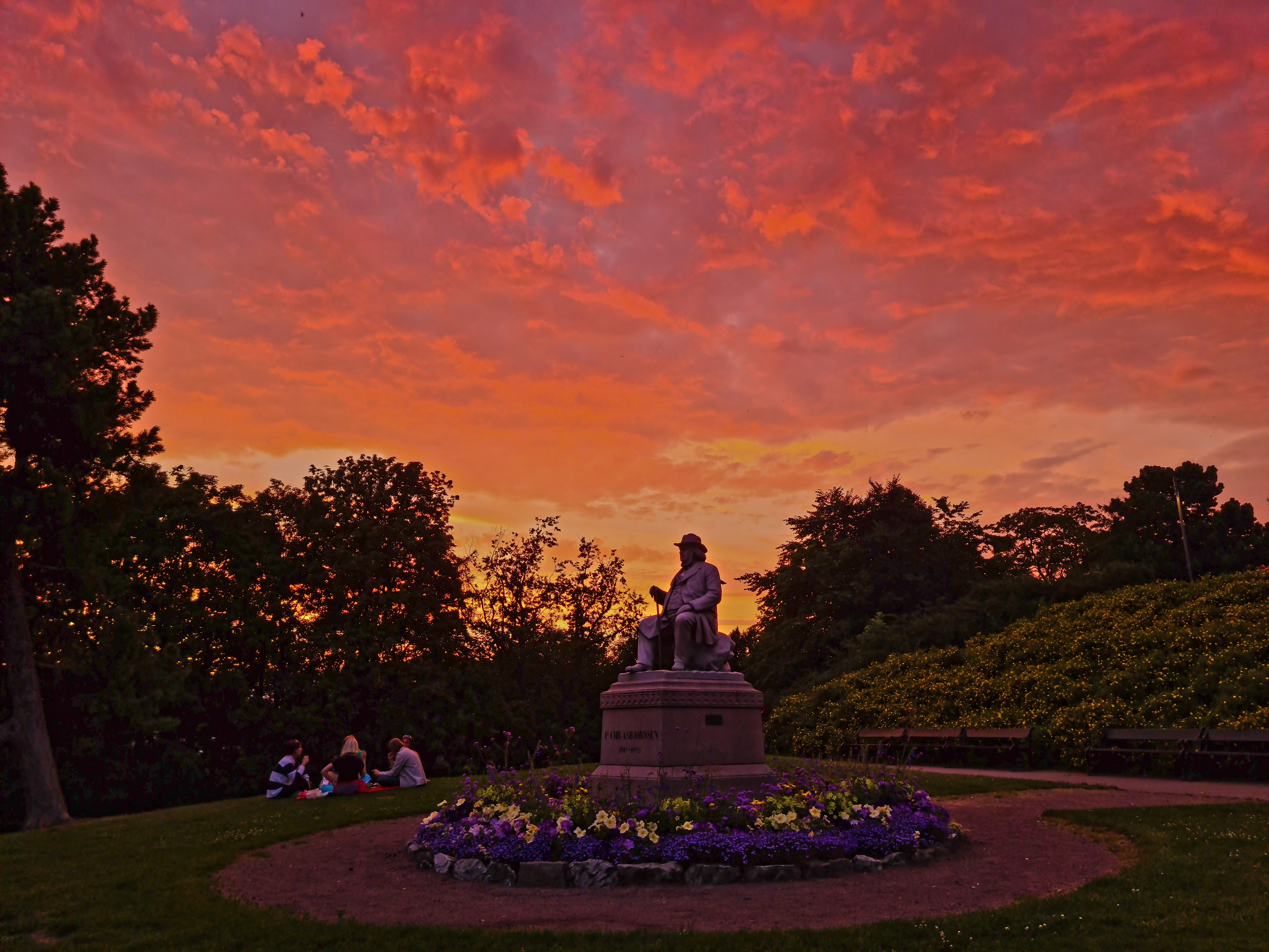

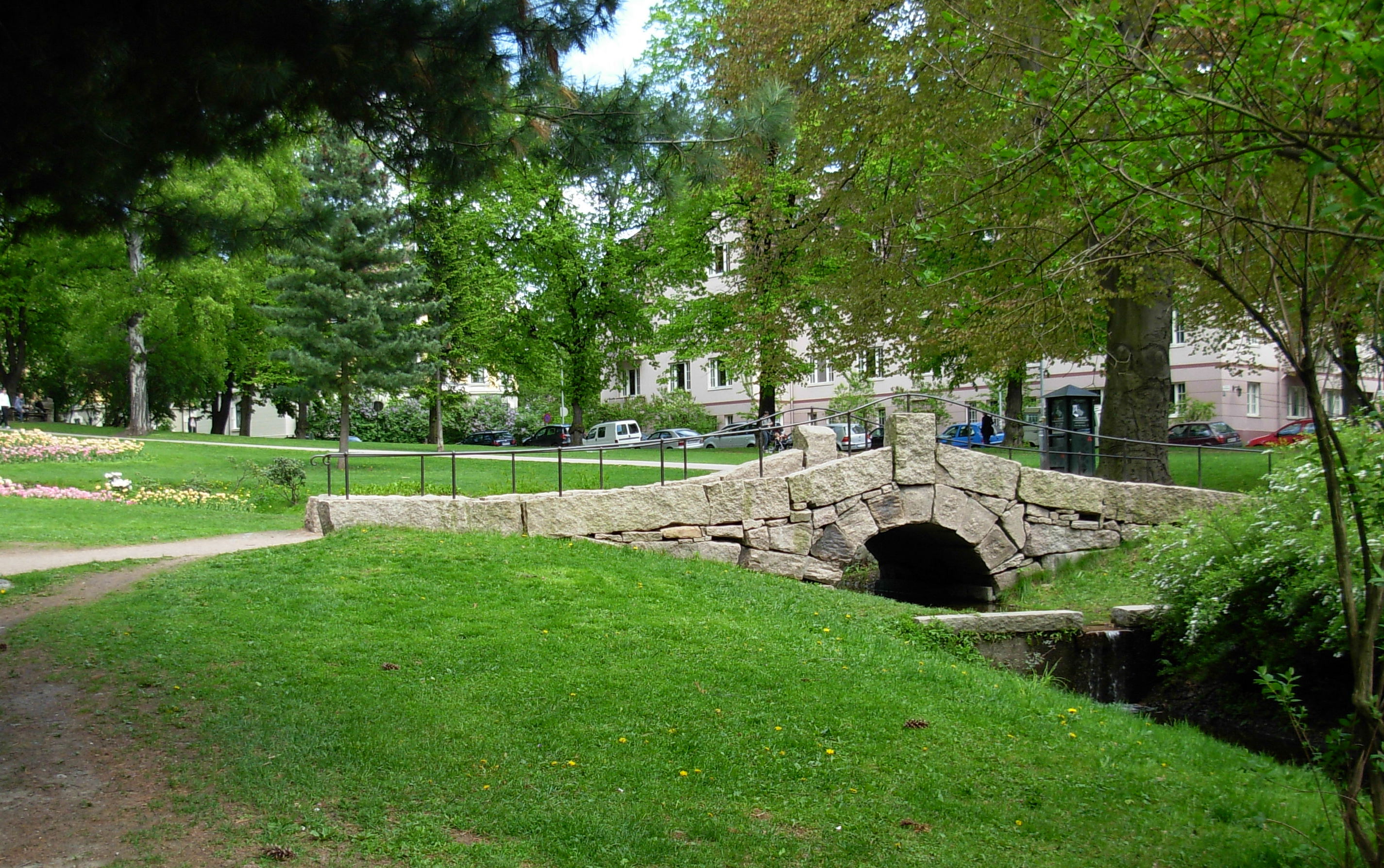
Stone bridge in St. Hanshaugen Park

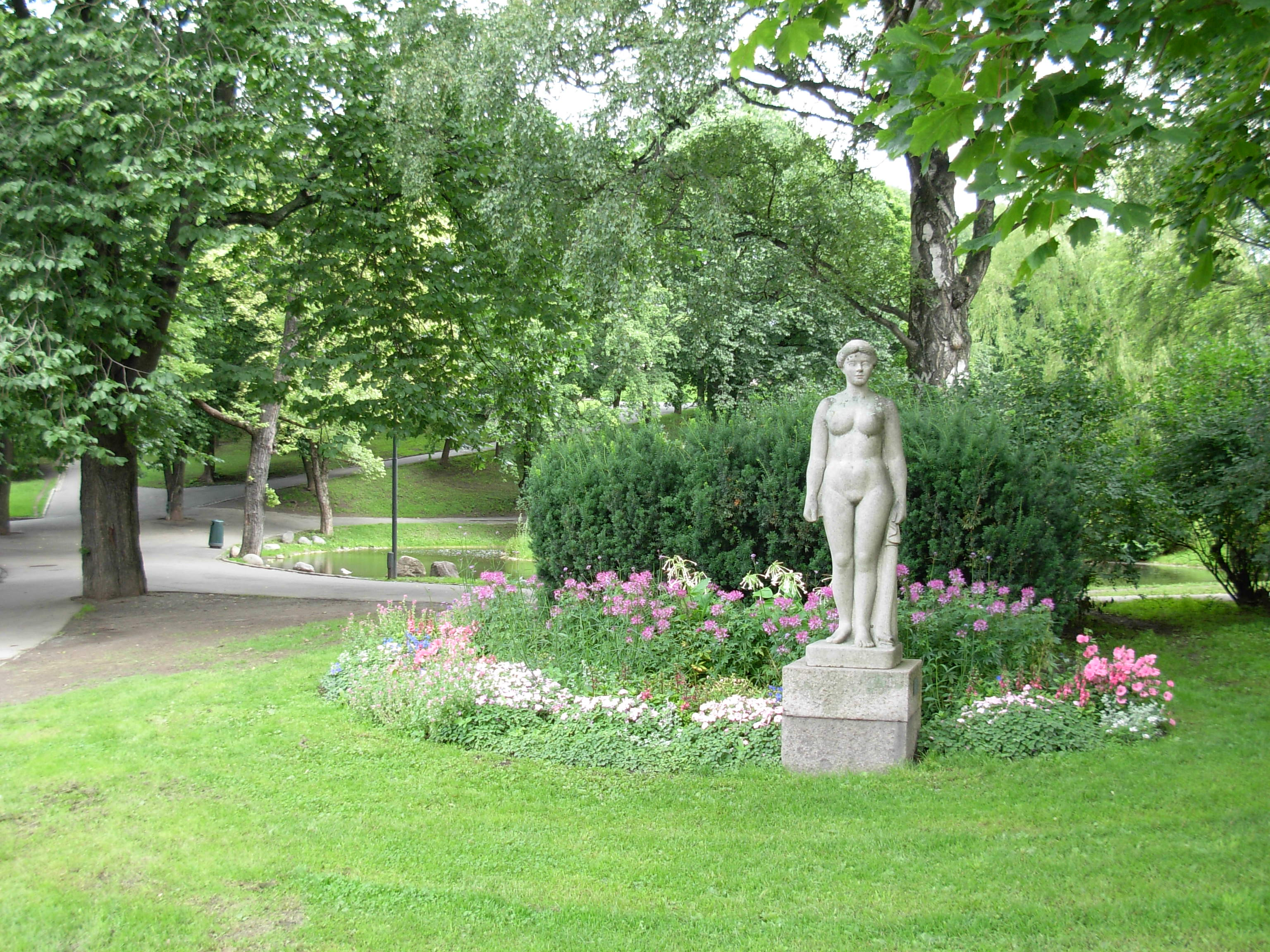
Southern end of St Hanshaugen

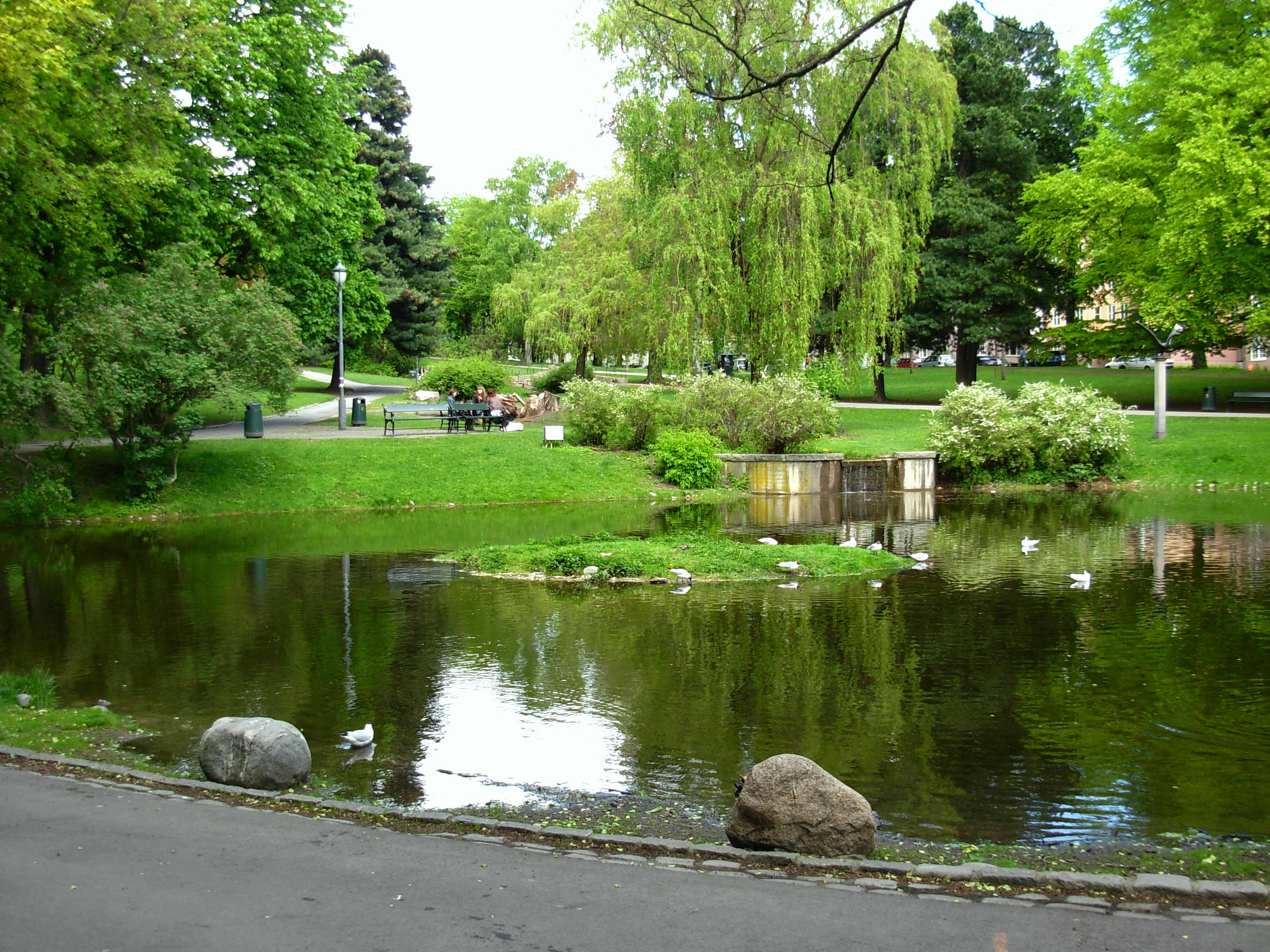
Swan pond at St. Hanshaugen Park

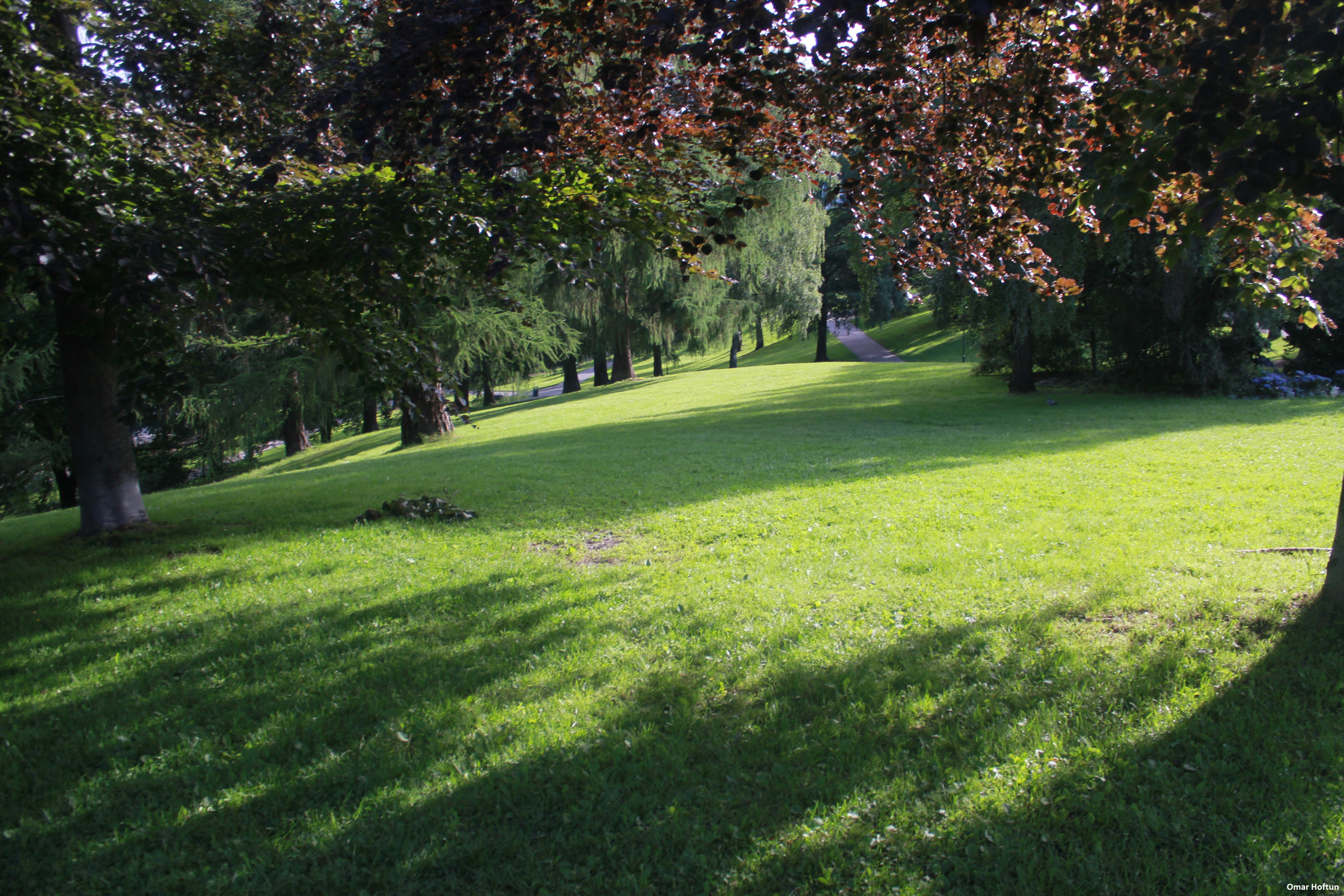
Meadow at St. Hanshaugen Park

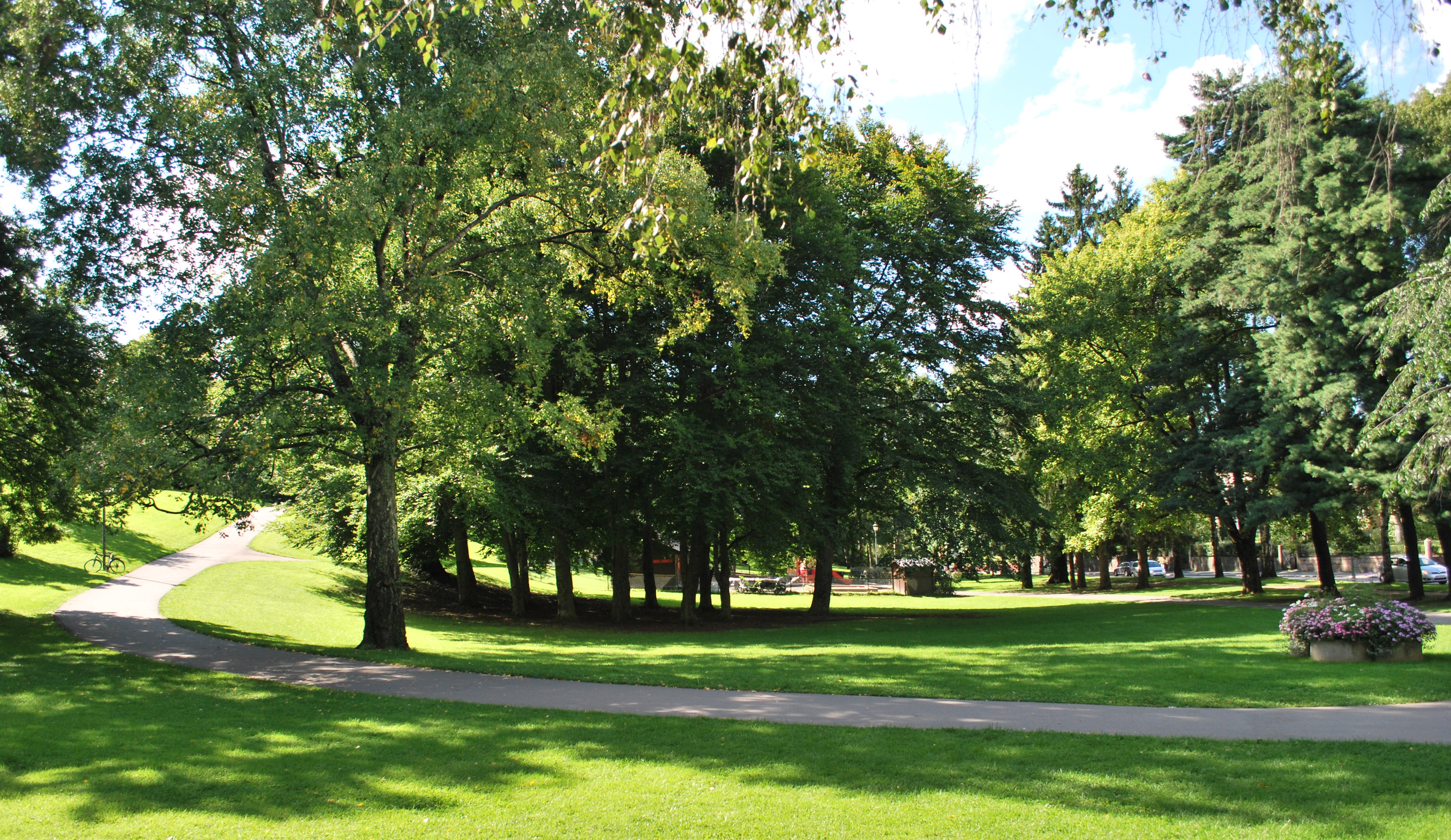
North end of St. Hanshaugen Park

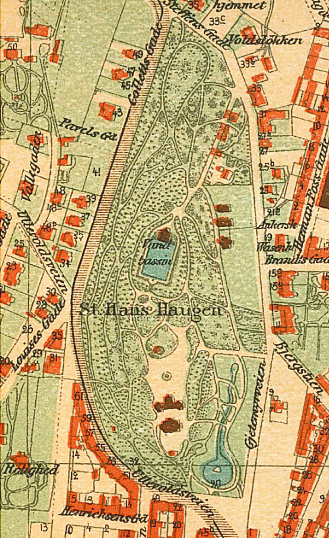
Map of St. Hanshaugen Park (1917)

== See also ==
- St. Hanshaugen borough of the city of Oslo, Norway
- Parks and open spaces in Oslo
