= Birkelunden =

Park in Oslo, Norway

Coordinates: 59°55′35″N 10°45′36″E

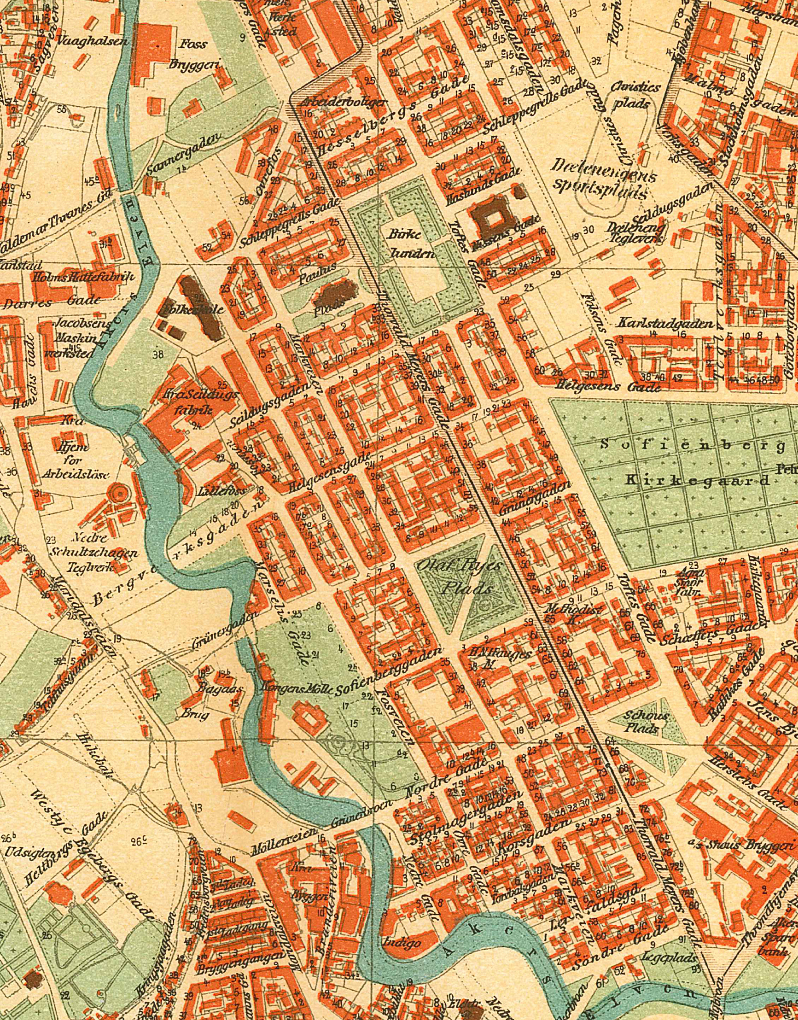
Map of the district, 1917.

Birkelunden (lit. 'The Birch Grove') is a park placed centrally in the Grünerløkka borough of Oslo, Norway. It is formed as a rectangle, more or less like a city block.

== History ==
The area belonged to the municipality of Aker until 1858, when it was incorporated into Christiania (Oslo). It was made into a park on Thorvald Meyer's orders in the 1860s. Having developed the neighborhood Grünerløkka, Meyer gave the park Birkelunden to the municipality in 1882. It received major renovations between 1916 and 1920 and 1984 and 1986. In 1920 it was the intention to create a children's playground as well as a small ice rink. A music pavilion was added in 1926, and a small pool added between 1927 and 1928. The park also has several monuments, including a monument to Norwegian volunteers in the Spanish Civil War. Other major parks in the area are Olaf Ryes plass, Sofienberg Park, and Tøyen Park.

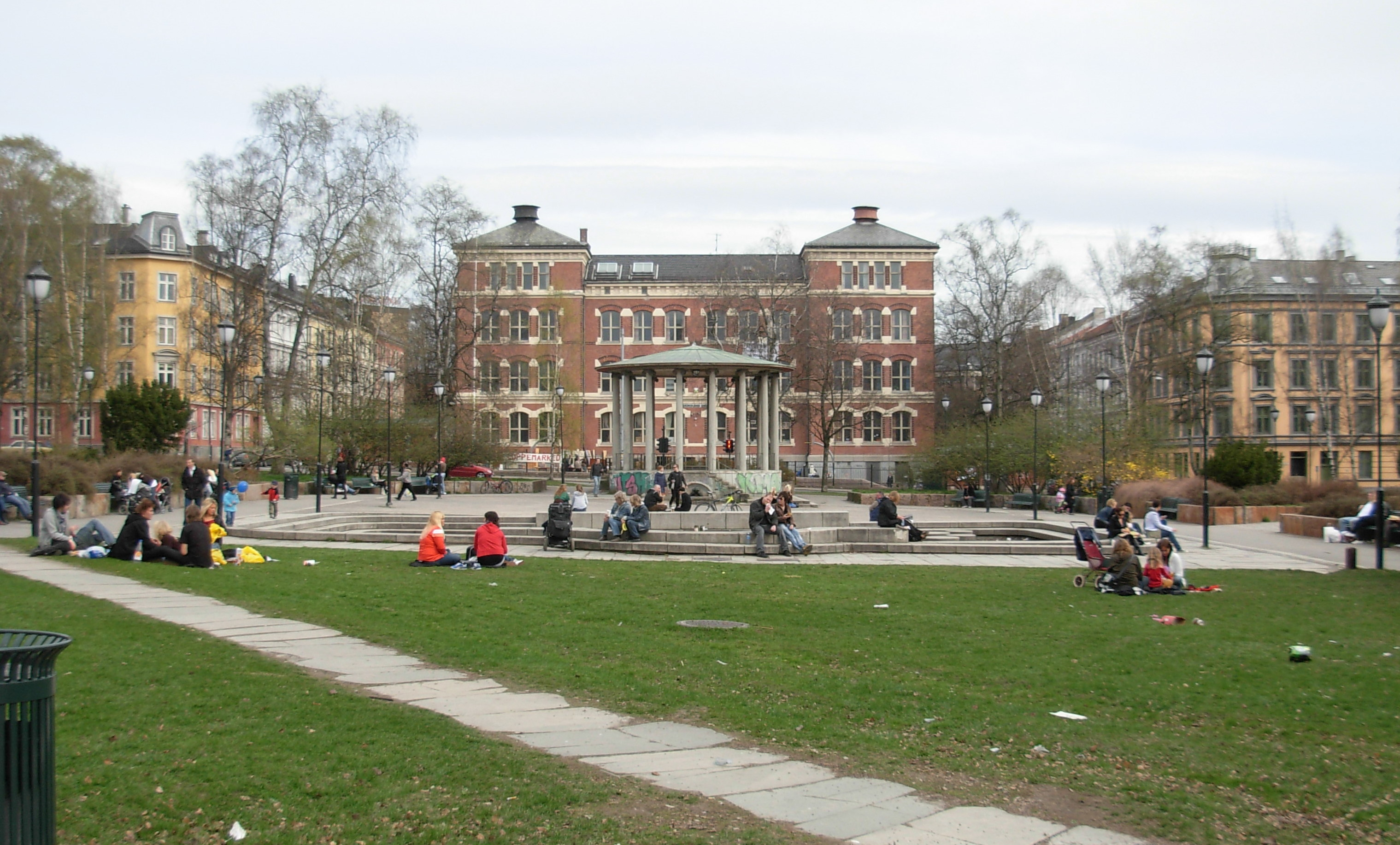
Birkelunden, with Grünerløkka school.

The park is surrounded by four streets, and housing three and four storeys tall, mostly built in the 1870s and 1880s. Grünerløkka School adjacent to the park was taken into use in 1895, and on the opposite side of the park is found Paulus Church from 1892.

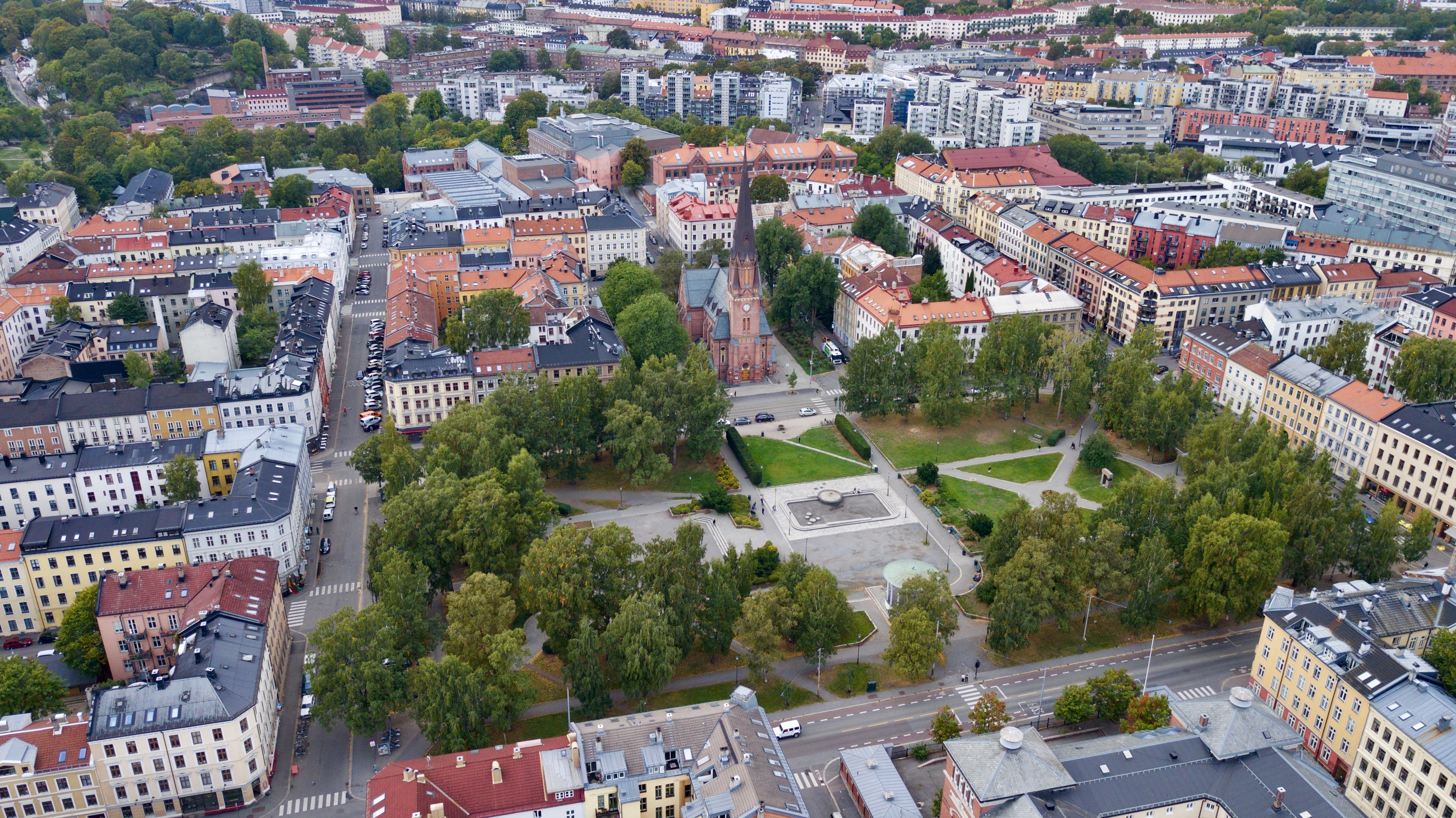
Birkelunden with surroundings as seen from the air.

In 2006 the park, school, church and fifteen blocks in the surrounding urban area was put under strict regulations, prohibiting any visible changes to the city environment. According to the Norwegian Ministry of the Environment, it was the first "preservation of a cultural [physical] environment in a city"; earlier the cultural environments Havråtunet, Sogndalsstrand, Utstein Abbey, Neiden and Kongsberg Silver Works had been preserved.

== Transport ==
Birkelunden has a light rail station on the Grünerløkka–Torshov Line of the Oslo Tramway. It is served by lines 11, 12 and 18. The park is also served by line 30 of Ruter's bus network.
