= Åmodt bro =

Bridge in Oslo, Norway

Coordinates: 59°55′33.604″N 10°45′9.9036″E

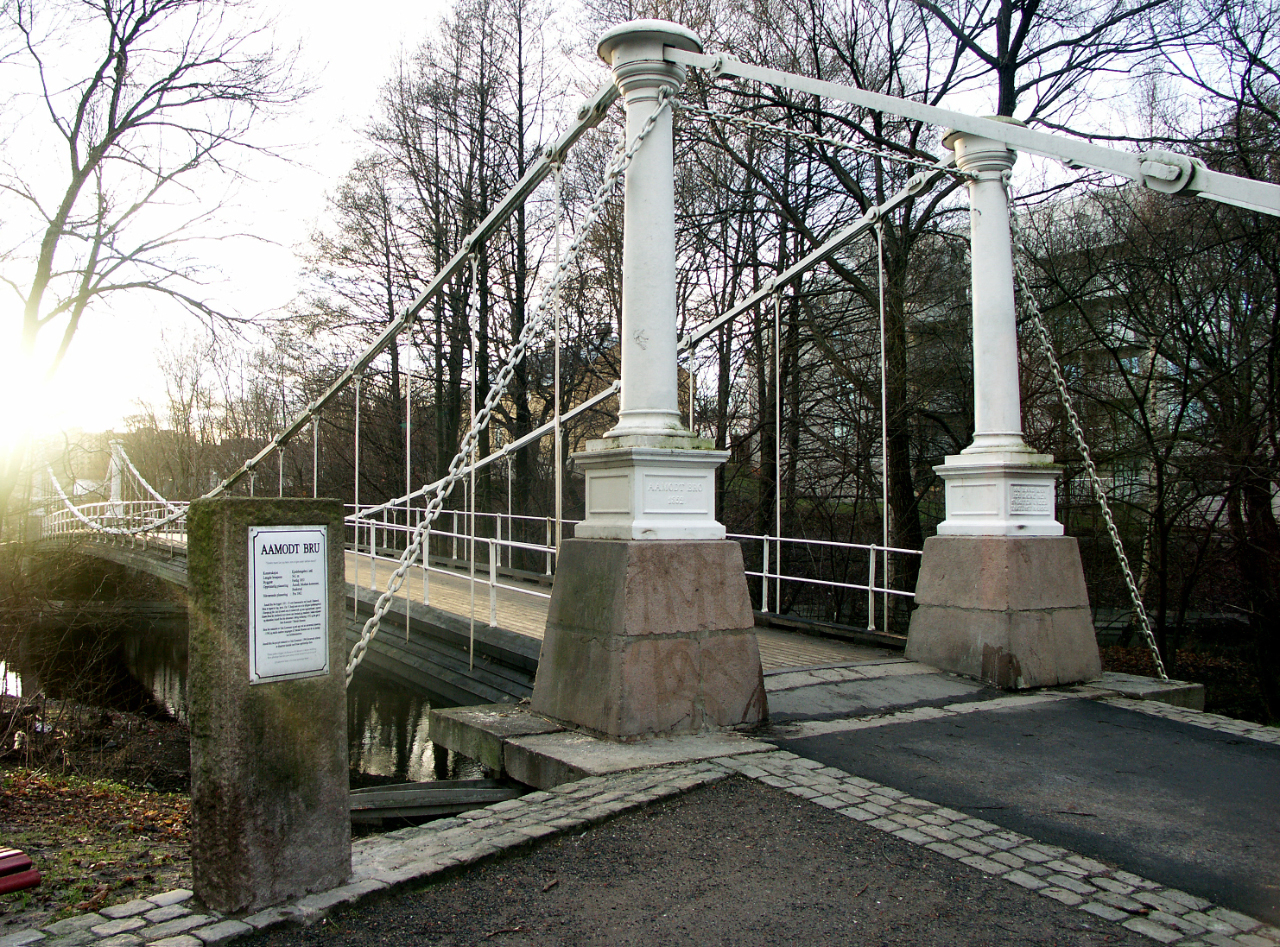
Aamodt bru

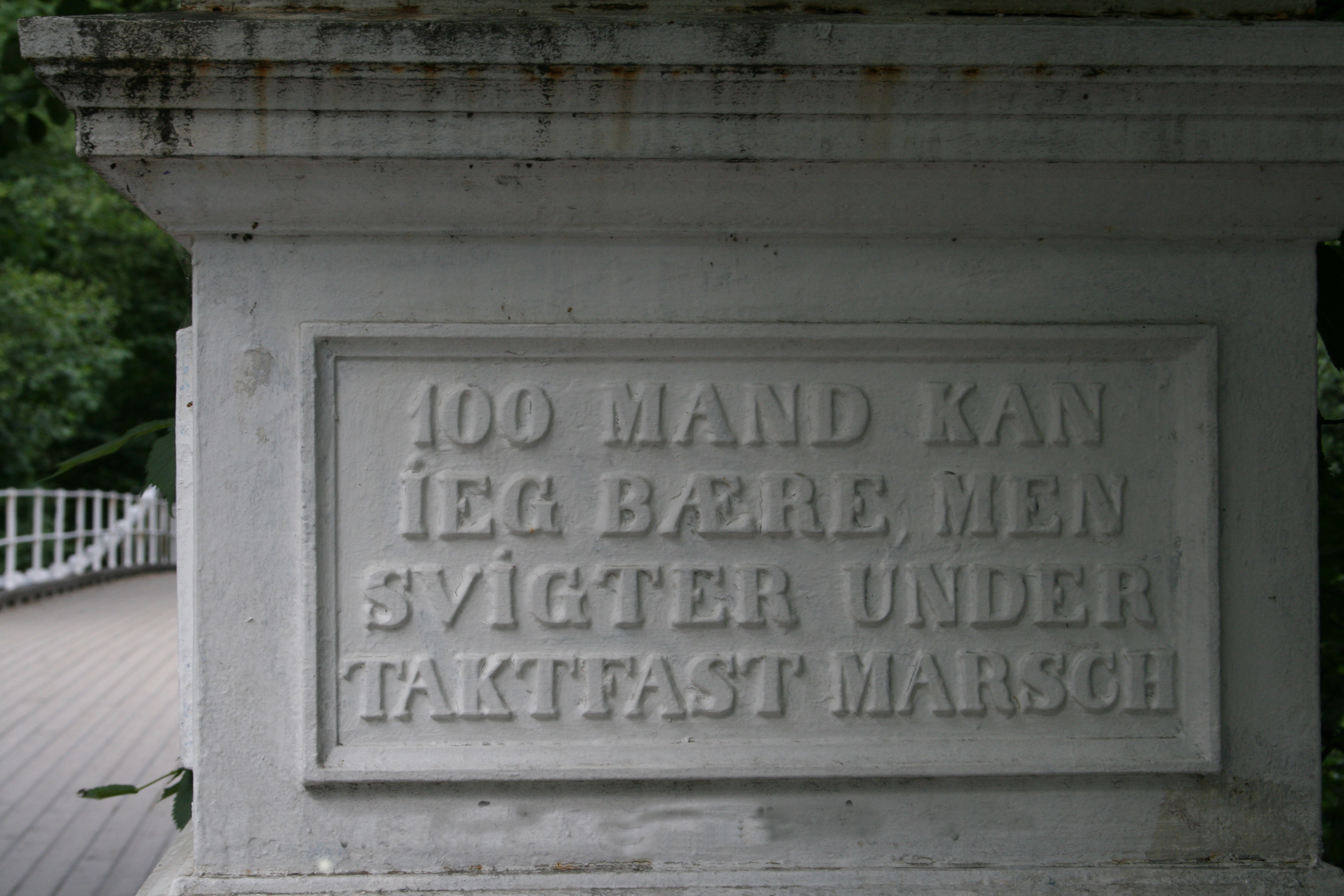
Inscription

Aamodt bru is a suspension bridge located Oslo, Norway. It is a pedestrian bridge over the Aker River in the Oslo district of Grünerløkka.

== History ==
Aamodt bru was originally built over the Drammen River in Buskerud near the mouth of the Simoa river at Åmot in Modum. The bridge was built during 1851–1852 of cast iron chains made with cast iron from the Nes Jernverk. The bridge was one of the earliest chain hangers in Norway.

Aamodt bru was later replaced by a new bridge due to poor condition and was given to Oslo municipality. During 1952 Aamodt bru was dismantled and moved piece by piece to a new site on the Aker River. It was intended to serve as an entrance to the Technical Museum which was planned to be built at the Aker River. However, the museum was later built elsewhere. Today the bridge is only used as a bicycle and pedestrian bridge.

== Inscription ==
The bridge has an inscription which serves as a warning in Norwegian: 100 MAND KAN IEG BÆRE, MEN SVIGTER UNDER TAKTFAST MARSCH. An English language translation of this is: "100 men I can bear, but [I will] fail during a rhythmic march".
