= Grünerløkka =

Borough of Oslo, Norway

Bydel Grünerløkka
- Borough
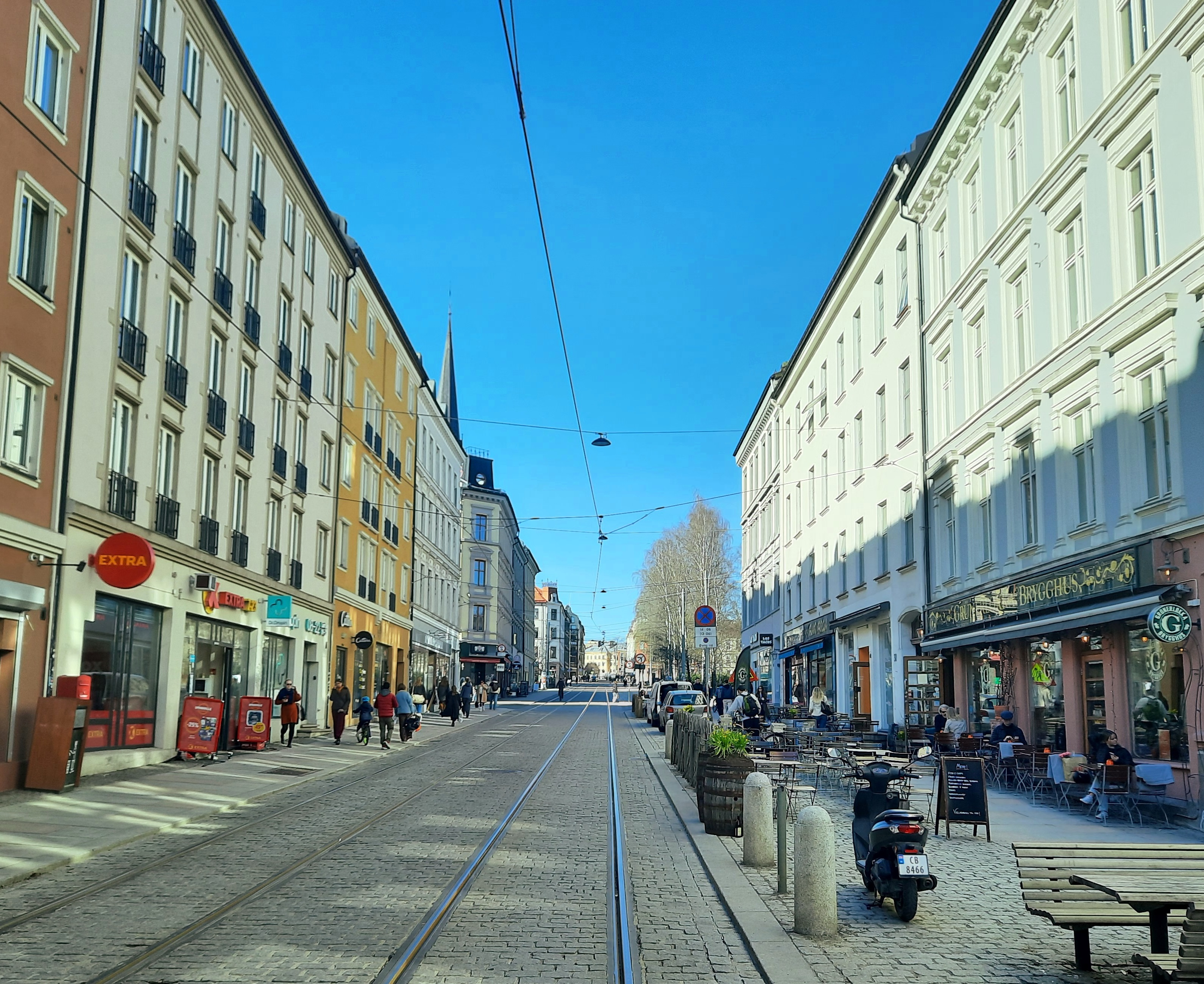
- Grünerløkka, Oslo. View of Thorvald Meyers street

- Coat of arms

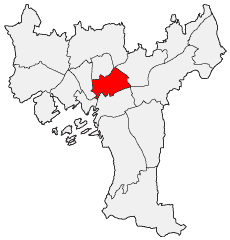
- Country: Norway
- City: Oslo

Area
  - Total: 4.75 km^{2} (1.83 sq mi)

Population (2020)
  - Total: 62,423
  - Density: 13,142/km^{2} (34,040/sq mi)
- Time zone: UTC+1 (CET)
  - Summer (DST): UTC+2 (CEST)
- ISO 3166 code: NO-030102
- Website: bydel-grunerlokka. oslo.kommune.no

Grünerløkka (Norwegian pronunciation: ['gryːnəˌɭœkːa]) is a borough but also a neighborhood of the city of Oslo, Norway. Grünerløkka became part of the city of Oslo (then Christiania) in 1858. Grünerløkka was traditionally a working class district; since the late 20th century the area has increasingly undergone gentrification. Especially in the core neighborhood of Grünerløkka, property prices tend to be higher than is typical of other Oslo East End boroughs.

The borough consists of the following neighborhoods:

- Grünerløkka vest (West)
- Grünerløkka øst (East)
- Dælenenga
- Rodeløkka
- Sinsen
- Sofienberg
- Hasle
- Løren

In the Oslo borough reform on 1 January 2004, the borough Helsfyr-Sinsen was removed, and the neighborhoods Sinsen, Løren, Lille Tøyen and Hasle were included in Grünerløkka.

== Etymology ==
The first element was derived from the surname Grüner. The last element is the definite form of løkke, meaning "paddock".

Grünerløkka was named after Friedrich Grüner (1628-1674) who served as chief administrator (Oberhauptmann) and the master of the mint (myntmester) at Christiania from 1651 until his death in 1674. Grüner purchased the Kings Mill (Kongens mølle) and surrounding acreage in the area from King Christian V of Denmark in 1672.

== History ==
Thorvald Meyer (1818–1909) bought parts of the Grünerløkka area in 1861. The industrialist built the main street of the neighborhood Grünerløkka, now named Thorvald Meyers gate. During the 19th century, Grünerløkka became a working-class area. Several factories were placed here because of the advantages of being located close to the Akerselva River. Christiania Seildugsfabrikk from 1856 and Aktieselskapet Herkules from 1898 were two of the factories established.

Grünerløkka is located with the parish of Paulus Church (Paulus kirke). In 1866, Paulus parish had a total population of 13,600. By 1900, the parish population had risen to 22,000. At that time, only five streets in Oslo had a population above 3000. Of these, three were located in Grünerløkka: Markveien, Thorvald Meyers gate and Toftes gate. In 1864, a square meter had been priced at about 30 Norwegian shilling Active selling of property started in 1865. However, even as Thorvald Meyer offered low-priced land, almost no one bought any of it until after 1868.

The park square called Olaf Ryes plass has its name from Norwegian-Danish General Olaf Rye (1791–1849). It was an open field well into the 1880s. The property was bought by Oslo kommune from members of the Grüner family in 1883. A narrow diagonal street was built which led from Markveien to Thorvald Meyers gate. It had a stopping spot for horses and carriages at the middle point. This section is now a pedestrian park square. The district's previous logo showed Mangelsgården, a listed building in Storgata 36 that is part of Prinds Christian Augusts Minde. From 2019, the district has used a common logo for Oslo.

== Politics ==
As a borough of Oslo, Grünerløkka is governed by the city council of Oslo as well as its own borough council. The council leader is Geir Jensen from the Green Party and the deputy leader is Vemund Rundberget, of the Labour Party. The Green Party has the most seats. The 15 seats are distributed among the following political parties for the 2019-2023 term:

- 4 from the Green Party (Miljøpartiet de Grønne)
- 3 from the Labour Party (Arbeiderpartiet)
- 3 from the Conservative Party (Høyre)
- 2 from the Red Party (Rødt)
- 2 from the Socialist Left Party (Sosialistisk Venstreparti)
- 1 from the Liberal Party (Venstre)

== Sports ==
The neighbourhood has its own sports club, Grüner, which was founded in 1914 with ice hockey and football as the most important activities. Grüner Fotball plays its home games at Dælenenga idrettspark and currently is part of the third division of the Norwegian football system. The ice hockey team plays the home games at Grünerhallen.

== Notable landmarks ==
- Sportsklubben av 1909
- Alexander Kiellands plass (Oslo)
- Åmodt bro
- Ankerbrua
- Ankertorget
- Birkelunden
- Blå
- Carl Berners plass
- Foss Brewery
- Foss videregående skole
- Freia
- Grünerhallen
- Keyserløkka
- Kulturkirken Jakob
- Kunsthøgskolen i Oslo
- Olaf Ryes plass
- Parkteatret
- Paulus kirke
- Prinds Christian Augusts Minde
- Ring 2
- Rodeløkka
- Sagene ring
- Schou Brewery
- Sinsenkrysset
- Sinsenparken
- Sofienberg
- Sofienberg kirke
- Sofienberg Park

== Gallery ==
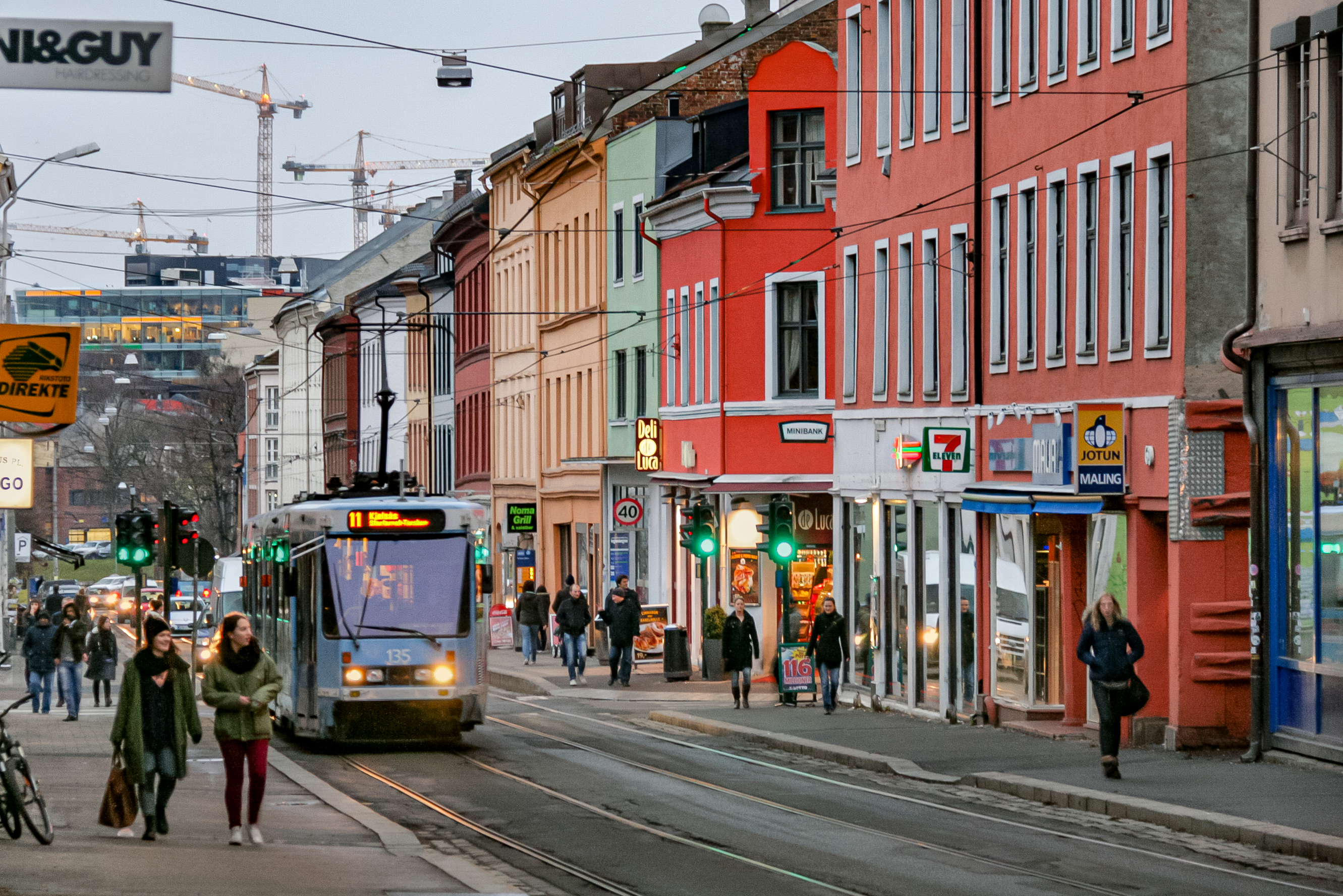
Grünerløkka, November 2011

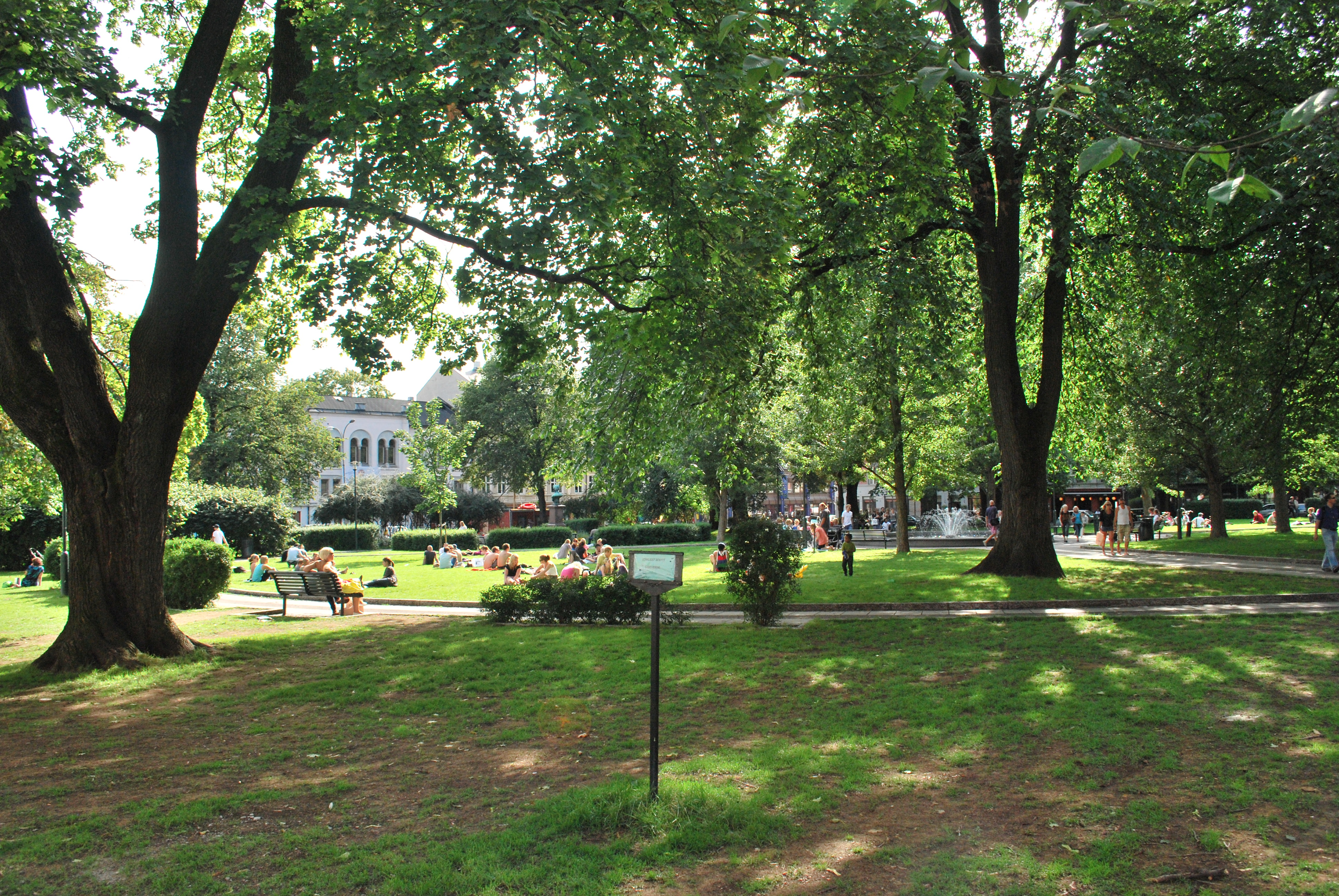
The park at Olaf Ryes plass, August 2009

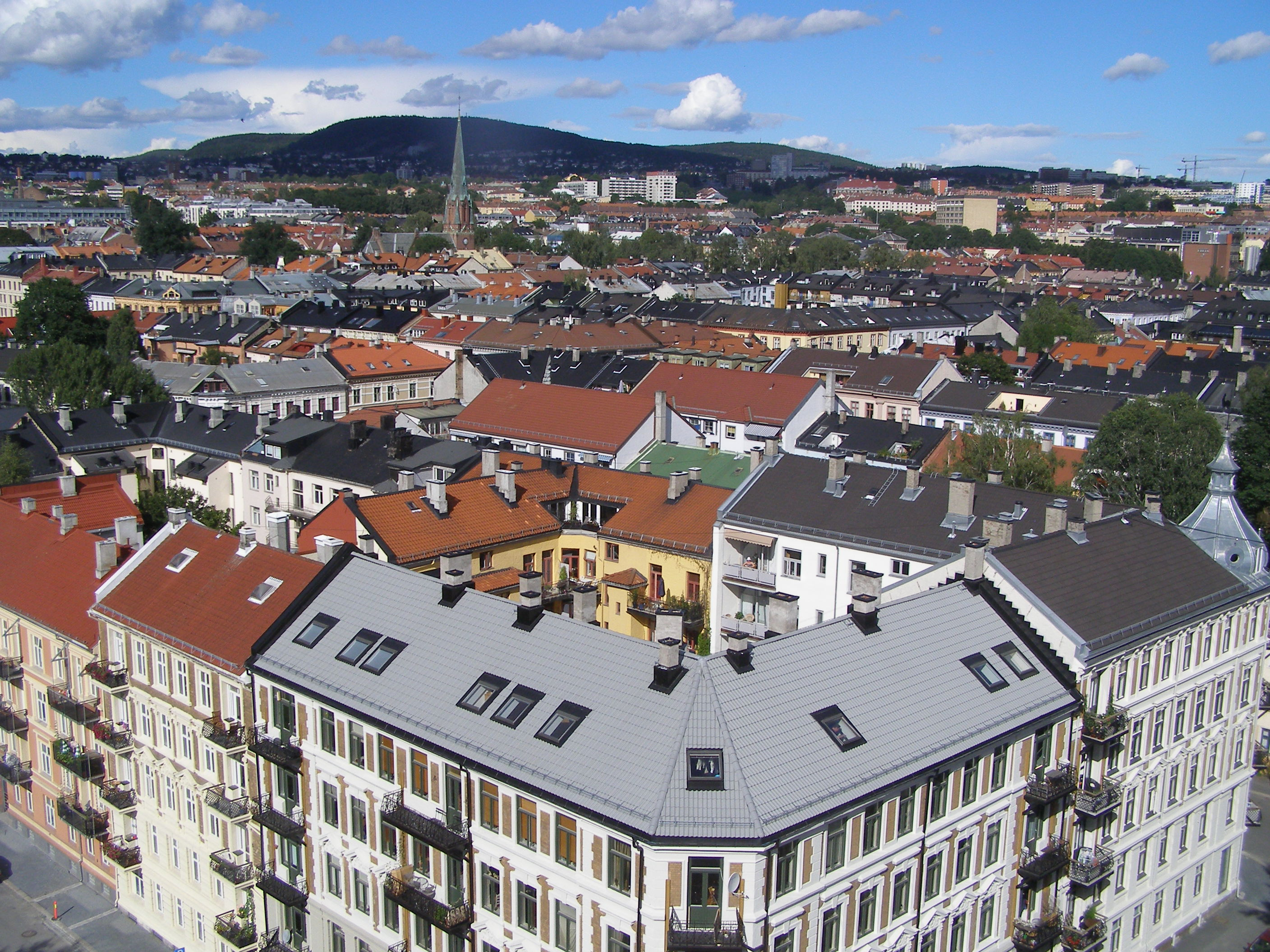
View from "silo" (Marselis gate 24) to the northeast of Grünerløkka, July 2007

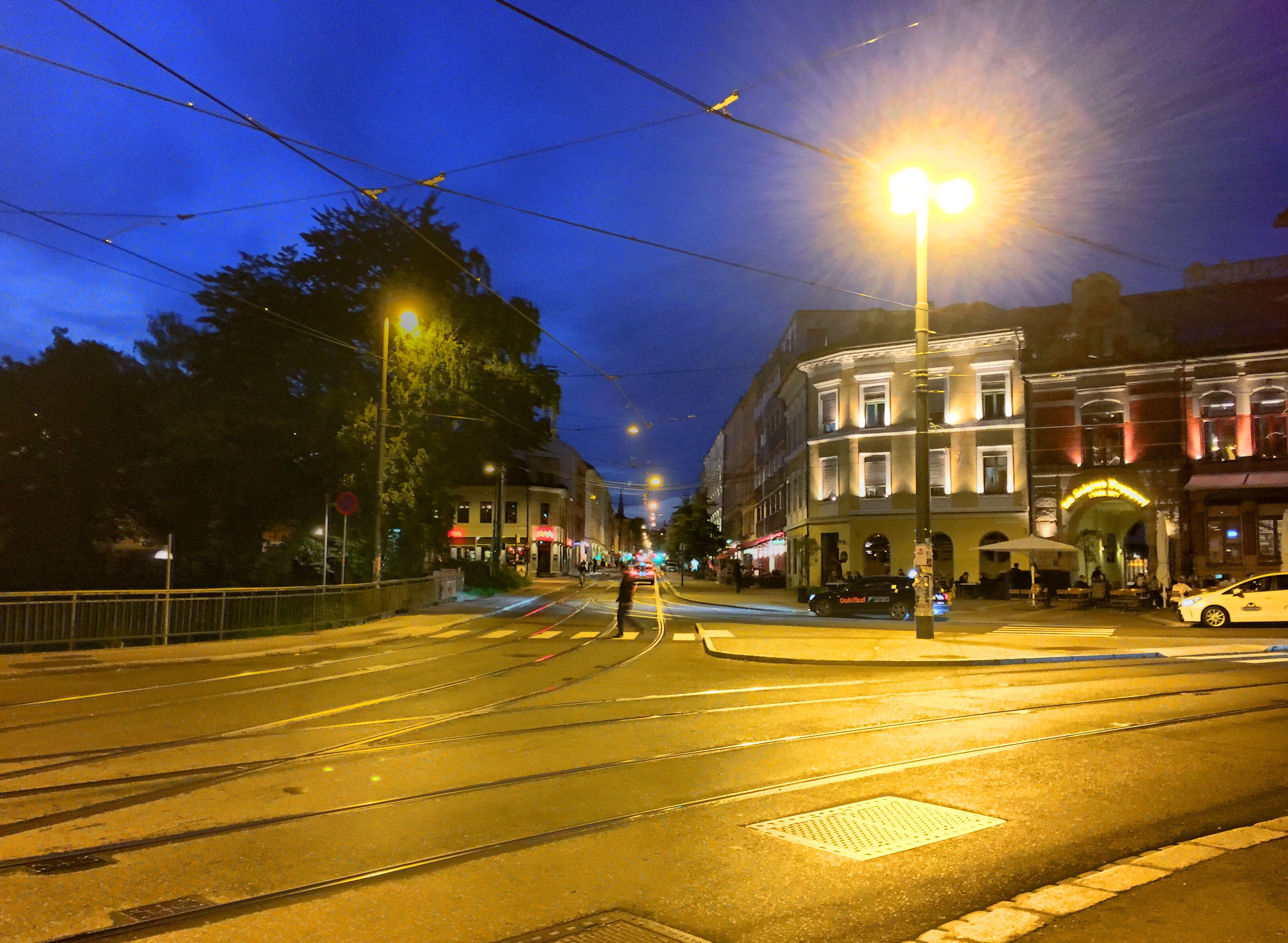
Grünerløkka, September 2015

== Other sources ==
- Knut Are Tvedt (editor) (2000) "Grünerløkka" in Oslo byleksikon (Oslo: Kunnskapsforlaget. 4th ed. pp. 170–171) ISBN 82-573-0815-3
