= Sofienberg Church =

- Sofienberg kirke
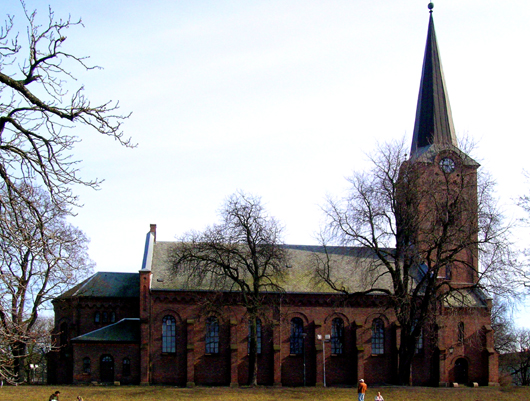
- Sofienberg Church
- 59°55′21.176″N 10°45′57.913″E
- Location: Rathkes gate 18, Grünerløkka; Oslo,
- Country: Norway
- Denomination: Church of Norway
- Churchmanship: Evangelical Lutheran
- Website: kirken.no/ps

History
- Former name(s): Paulus Kirke; Petrus Kirke
- Status: Parish church
- Consecrated: 1877

Architecture
- Functional status: Active
- Architect: Jacob Wilhelm Nordan

Specifications
- Capacity: 500
- Materials: Red Brick

Administration
- Diocese: Diocese of Oslo
- Parish: Paulus-Sofienberg

Sofienberg Church is located at Sofienberg in Oslo, Norway and is designed by the Danish-born architect Jacob Wilhelm Nordan. It was first known as Paulus Kirke (St Paul's) but its name was changed to Petrus Kirke (St Peter's) in 1892 and finally to Sofienberg Kirke in 1962. The church is surrounded by Sofienberg Park, where it was previously a cemetery. The church was consecrated in 1877 and seats approximately 500.

The altarpiece, which shows Christ on the Cross was painted by Otto Sinding in 1879. The church has stained glass windows at the main entrance, made by Maria Vigeland (1951) and on the south wall, made by Enevold Thømt (1920). The church organ is from 2013. It has 42 voices. The new organ was supplied by the German organ builder firm Eule. The church is known to have good acoustics and is an attractive concert venue in Oslo's Eastend.

The church is protected by law by the Norwegian Directorate for Cultural Heritage.

== Gallery ==
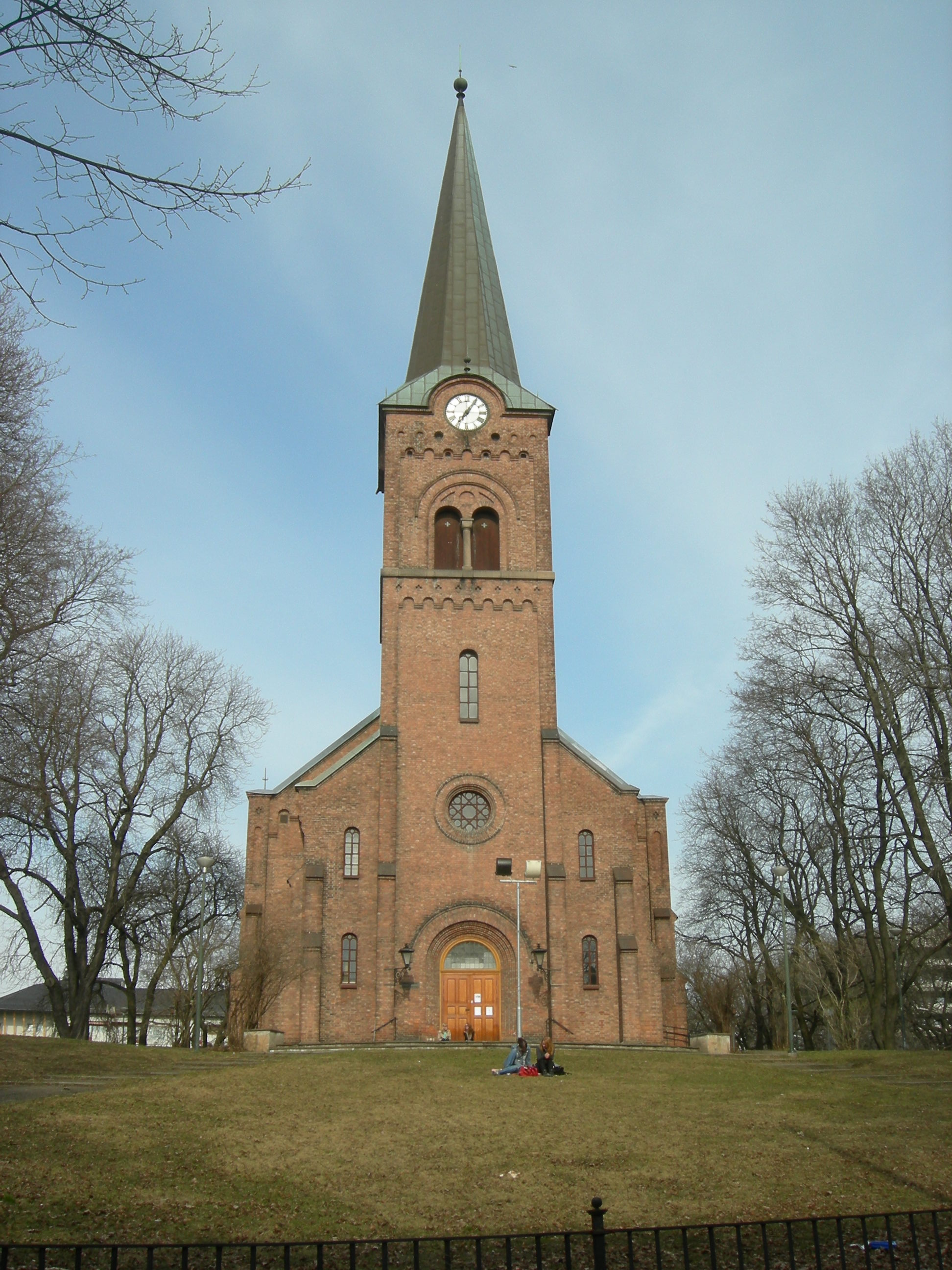
Sofienberg Church, seen from south

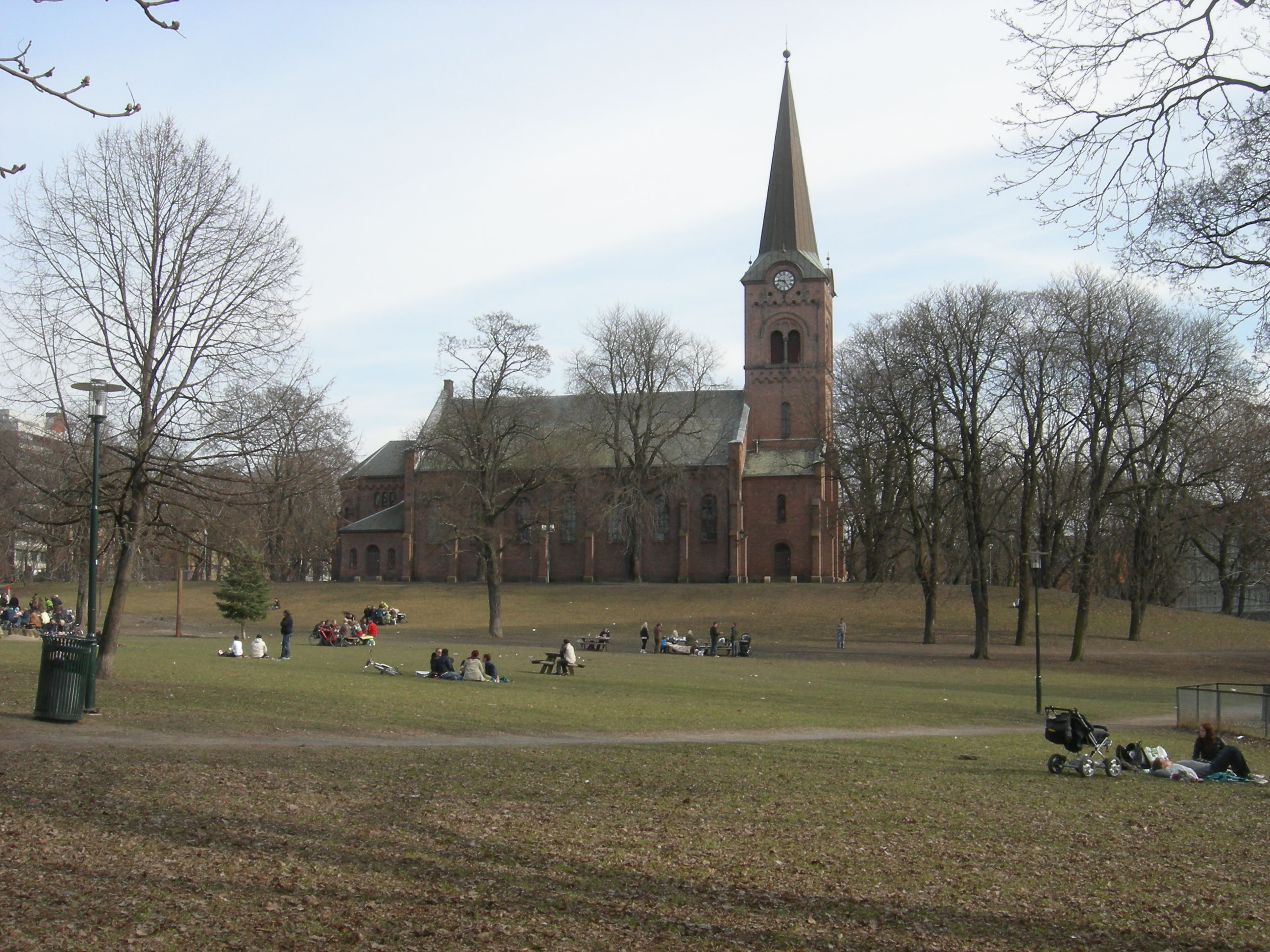
Sofienberg Church in the background, as seen from Sofienberg Park (west)

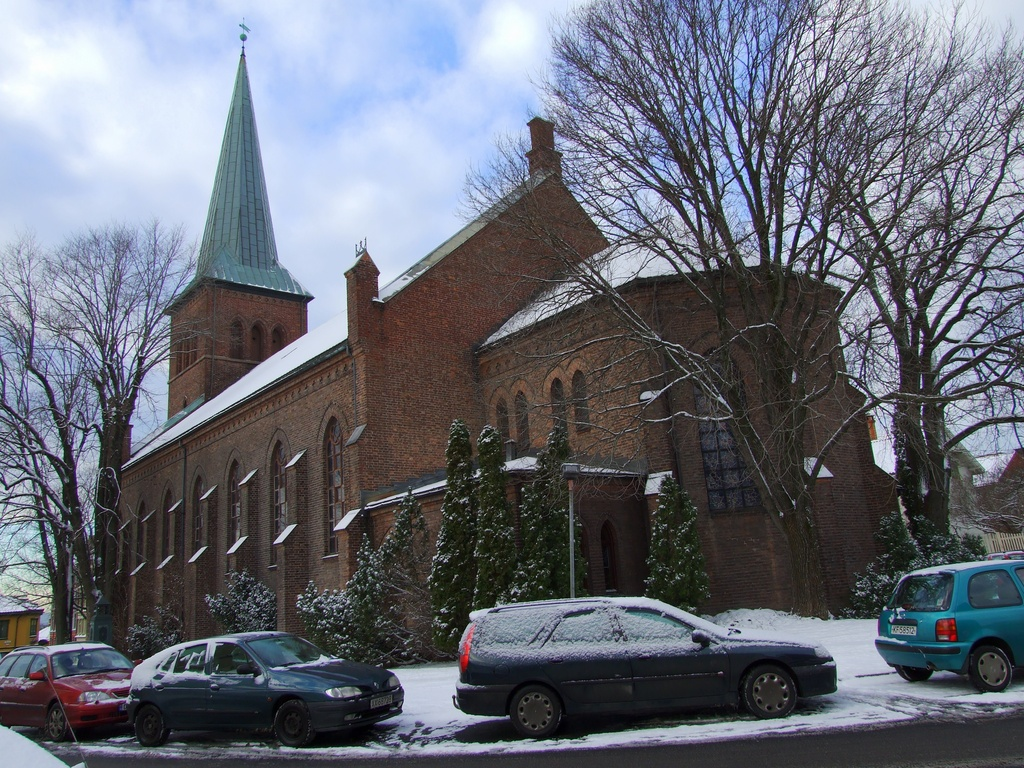
Sofienberg Church, seen from north
