= Geir Johnson =

Norwegian composer (1953–2021)

Geir Johnson (13 June 1953 – 16 September 2021) was a Norwegian composer, writer and initiator of culture projects living at Nesodden outside Oslo. He was born in Fredrikstad, and received his first musical training as a soprano soloist in boys' choirs in Oslo, followed by music training in piano and singing, as well as choral conducting studies with Knut Nystedt. His own performance career spanned from many years of choral conducting, via a short career as singer and keyboard player in a rock band, to performance artist in a multi-artist collective titled The TRASH Ensemble.

== Education ==
Johnson studied musicology, philosophy and social sciences at the University of Oslo and University of Bergen, receiving his Ph.D. in 1983. He was visiting scholar at the CCRMA, Center for Computer Research in Music and Acoustics at Stanford University in 1988-1889, and was invited as visiting composer to the Rockefeller Foundation in Bellagio, Italy, in 2010. As a composer, he was largely autodidact, having written more than 60 works for various ensembles, soloists and occasions.

== Work ==
Geir Johnson was active in the field of concert planning and management, first from the early 1980s at the Henie-Onstad Arts Centre in Oslo, later by establishing the BIT 20 Ensemble and the Music Factory festival in Bergen. In the early 1990s, he was one of the founders of the contemporary music theatre company Opera Vest in Bergen, today named The Bergen National Opera, financed over the budget of the Norwegian Ministry of Culture . From 1989 to 1995, he was President of Ny Musikk, the Norwegian section of ISCM, during which period the organization was also host to the ISCM World Music Days in 1990. From 1998 to 2009, he was in charge as Artistic and Managing Director of the Ultima Oslo Contemporary Music Festival, of which he was also one of the founders. As part of this work he also planned and co-developed music projects in many European countries, as one of the founding members of the festival network Réseau Varèse in 1999.

Since 2003, he developed Parkteatret, a multi-purpose concert hall with approximately 250 events a year, without public support; it is located in downtown Oslo.

Since 2005, he was the founder of Transposition, a large-scale music cooperation and development project for twelve leading music institutions in Vietnam and Norway, and continued this work in the HEDDA Foundation, by contributing to build a new building for the Gitameit Music school in Yangon, Myanmar. Geir Johnson has lectured on central topics in 20th century music and arts at Nordic universities, academies and at international conferences around the world, as well as published essays, articles and reviews, on issues ranging from popular music research to the contemporary music scene and cultural politics, in approximately 100 journals, magazines and newspapers worldwide.

He has received several grants and awards. In 2002, he was awarded the Fegersten Foundation Music Prize for his lifetime contribution to Norwegian music; in 2015, the Ministry of Culture, Sports and Tourism in Hanoi honored him with a medal for his contribution to the development of the Vietnamese music life.

In 2015, Johnson edited the book Viet Nam Overtures, a collection of articles covering the history and development of Transposition.

December 2016 saw Johnson being bestowed with Norwegian collecting society TONO´s Outreach Prize.

Johnson has also been a board member for a number of Norwegian cultural institutions and organizations; as of 2015, he was serving as Chairman of the Board for Oslo’s multicultural MELA Festival and the classical music festival Valdres Sommersymfoni.

== Works ==
=== Selected works ===
- LOPPHAVET (2016)
- Silent Spring : For string orchestra (2014), commissioned and performed by the Vietnam National Symphony Orchestra
- Bygdin (2011) for woodwinds and percussion, commissioned and performed by Staff Band of the Norwegian Armed Forces, Bergen
- Lyriske stykker : String Quartet Bd. 2, 1-6 (2004)
- The Black Snake : For Speaking Cellist (2001)
- Body Theory : For Brass Quartet and Percussion (2000)
- Engleåpenbaringene : For choir and soprano solo (2000)
- Slow Emotion (1998)
- Sentimental Journey for Orchestra : Hommage à Ringo Starr... (1993)
- Talking / Singing for Solo Voice (1992)
- I Due Martelli for Violin and Viola (1992)
- String Quartet for dancers (1991)
- Divisi for Wind Ensemble and Optional Electronics (1991)
- Radar (1989)

=== Discography ===
- Einar Steen-Nøkleberg, Siri Torjesen, Talking / Singing - American Poetry in Music (1996)
