= Keyserløkka =

Neighborhood in Oslo, Norway

Coordinates: 59.9237°N 10.787°E

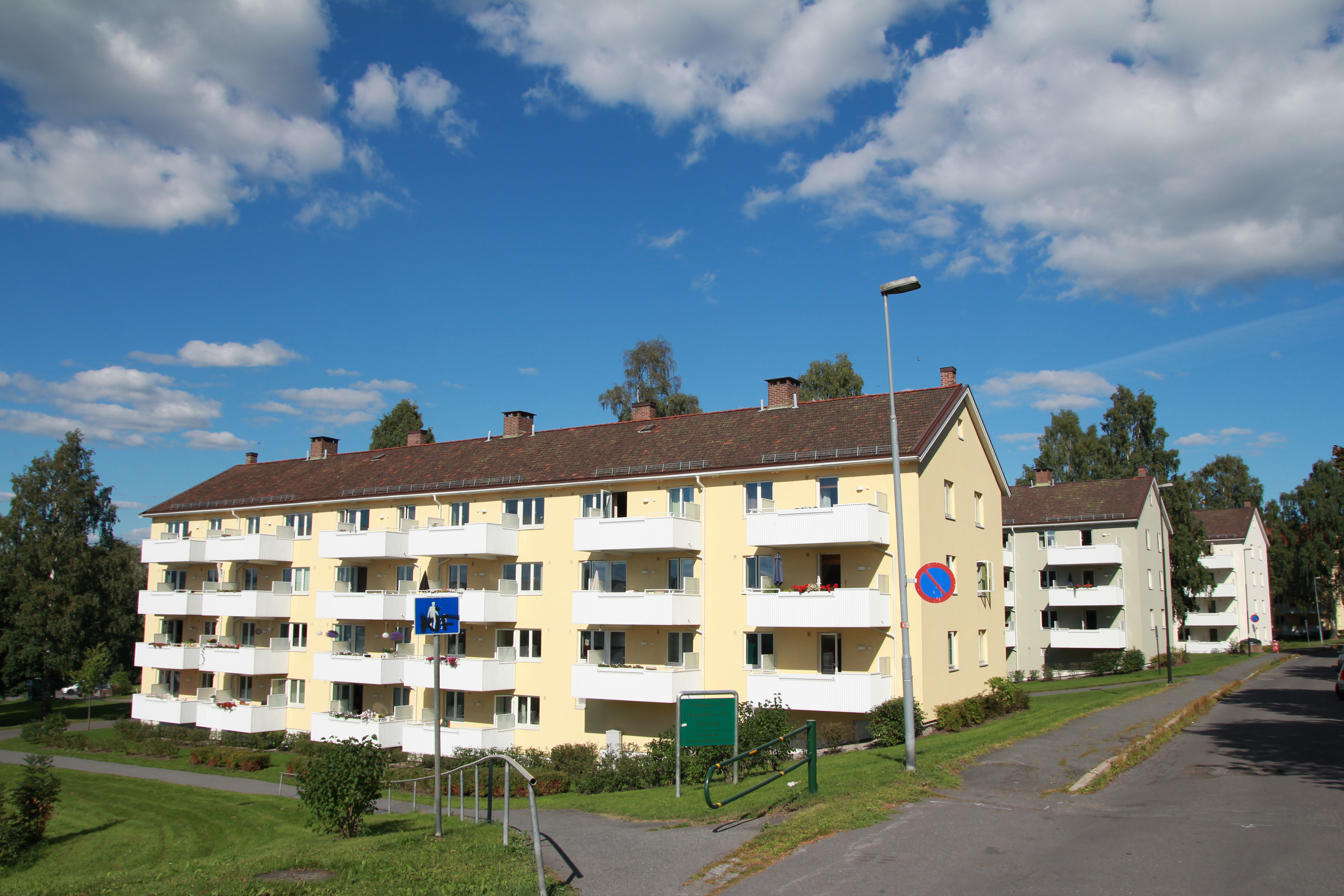
Keyserløkka neighborhood.

Keyserløkka is a neighborhood in the borough of Grünerløkka in Oslo, Norway.

It was originally farmland under Tøyen. In 1850 it was given to professor Rudolf Keyser. It was later sold to the municipality, and built up with larger buildings between 1949 and 1956.
