= Paulus Church =

St. Paul's Church
- Paulus kirke
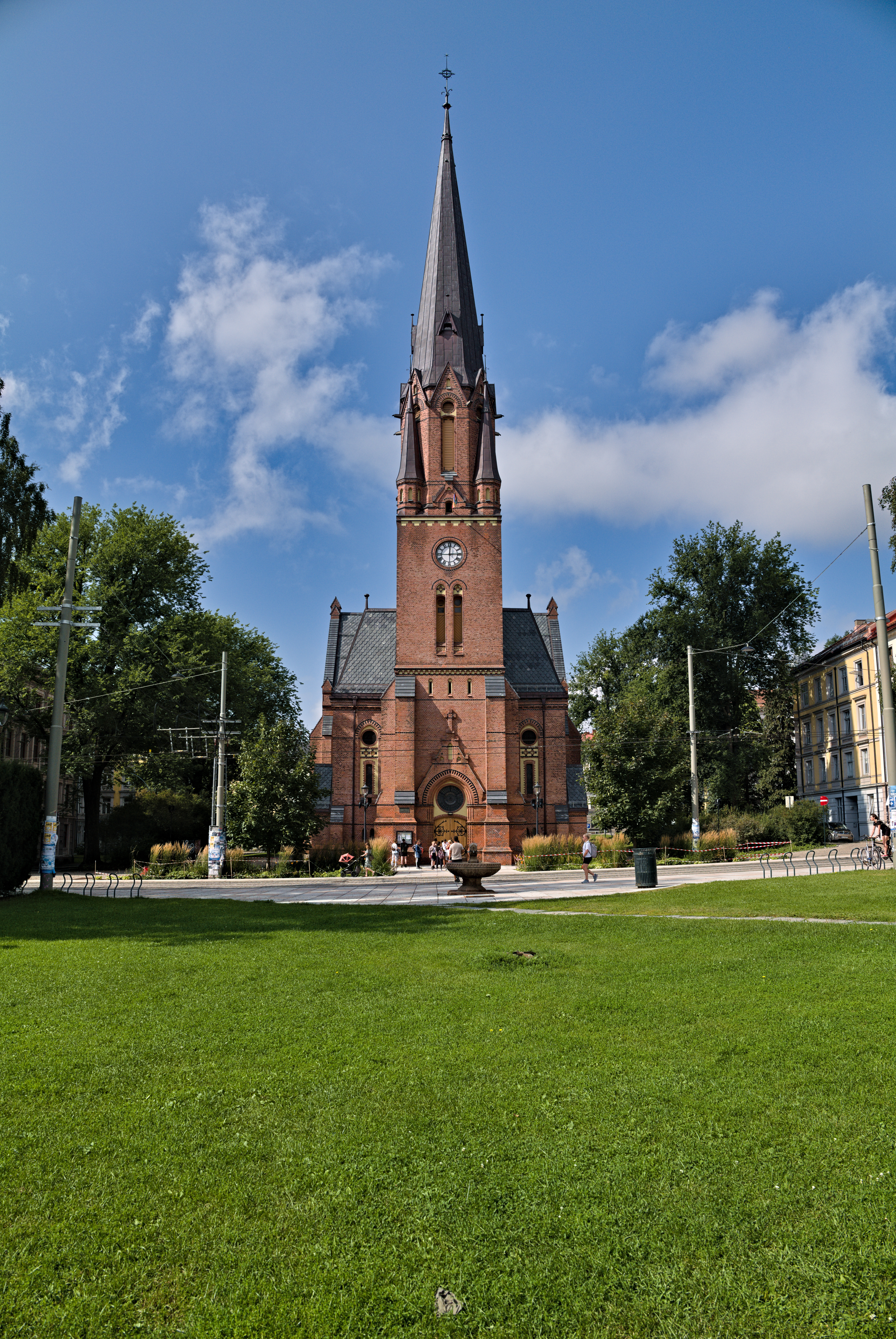
- St. Paul's Church in 2022
- St. Paul's Church
- 59°55′34.50″N 10°45′30″E
- Location: Thorvald Meyers gate 31, Grünerløkka; Oslo,
- Country: Norway
- Denomination: Church of Norway
- Churchmanship: Evangelical Lutheran
- Website: www.pauluskirke.org

History
- Status: Parish church
- Dedication: Paul the Apostle
- Consecrated: 1892

Architecture
- Functional status: Active
- Architect: Henrik Bull
- Style: Gothic

Specifications
- Capacity: 500
- Materials: Red Brick

Administration
- Diocese: Diocese of Oslo
- Parish: Paulus-Sofienberg

Paulus Church (Norwegian: Paulus kirke; tr. Paul's Church or St. Paul's Church) is a church which was consecrated in 1892, located in Grünerløkka in Oslo, Norway, just opposite the Birkelunden Park. The church is made of brick with a weak front running cross-arms and has about 500 seats. It is inspired by German Gothic style and has a high narrow tower above the entrance, which faces east. Paul's Church was designed by the architect Henrik Bull in 1889, and restoration of the church were made in 1917-18 and in 1972.

The Church's altarpiece is in the brown-stained pine with gold trim and divided into three. It is adorned with trumpet angels by Jo Visdalen and two altar paintings by Christen Brun. Between the two paintings are a Christ Figure in plaster made by the sculptor Gunnar Olsen Alvær in 1894.

The church organ at Paulus Church was designed by the German organ maker Albert Hollenbach to the church's consecration in 1892. The organ underwent an expansion in 1943.

== Gallery ==
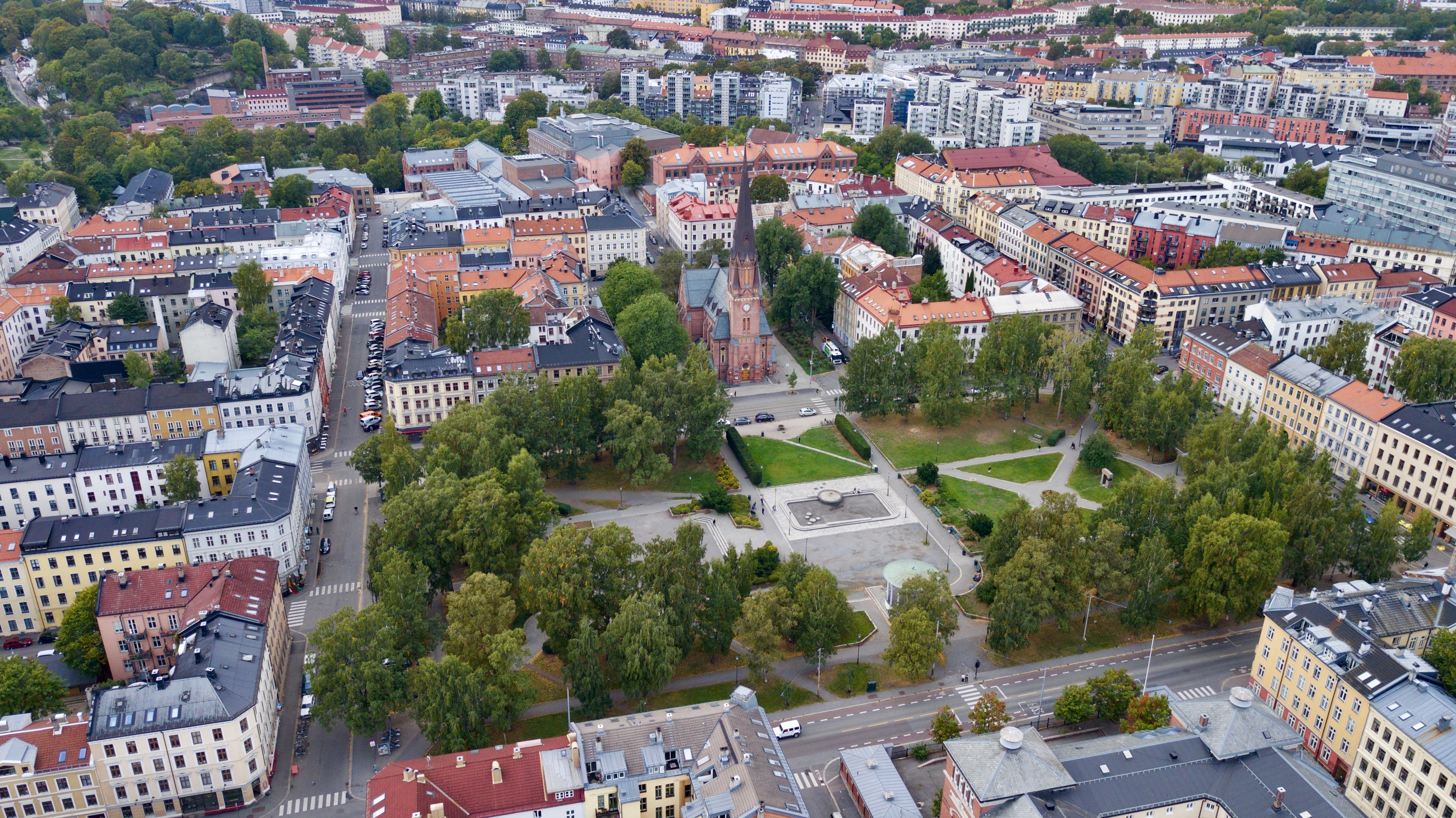
Location, September 2018

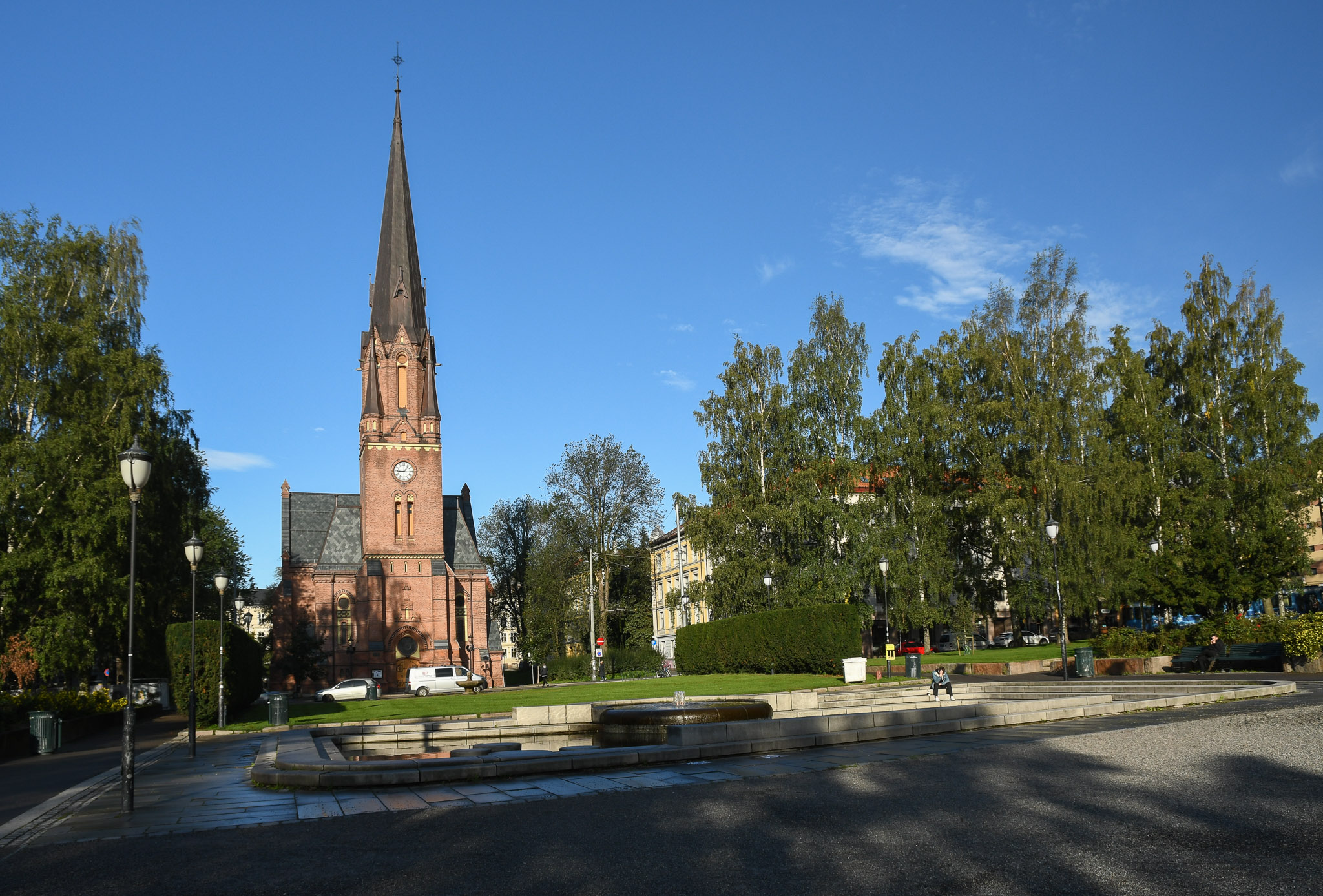
September 2019

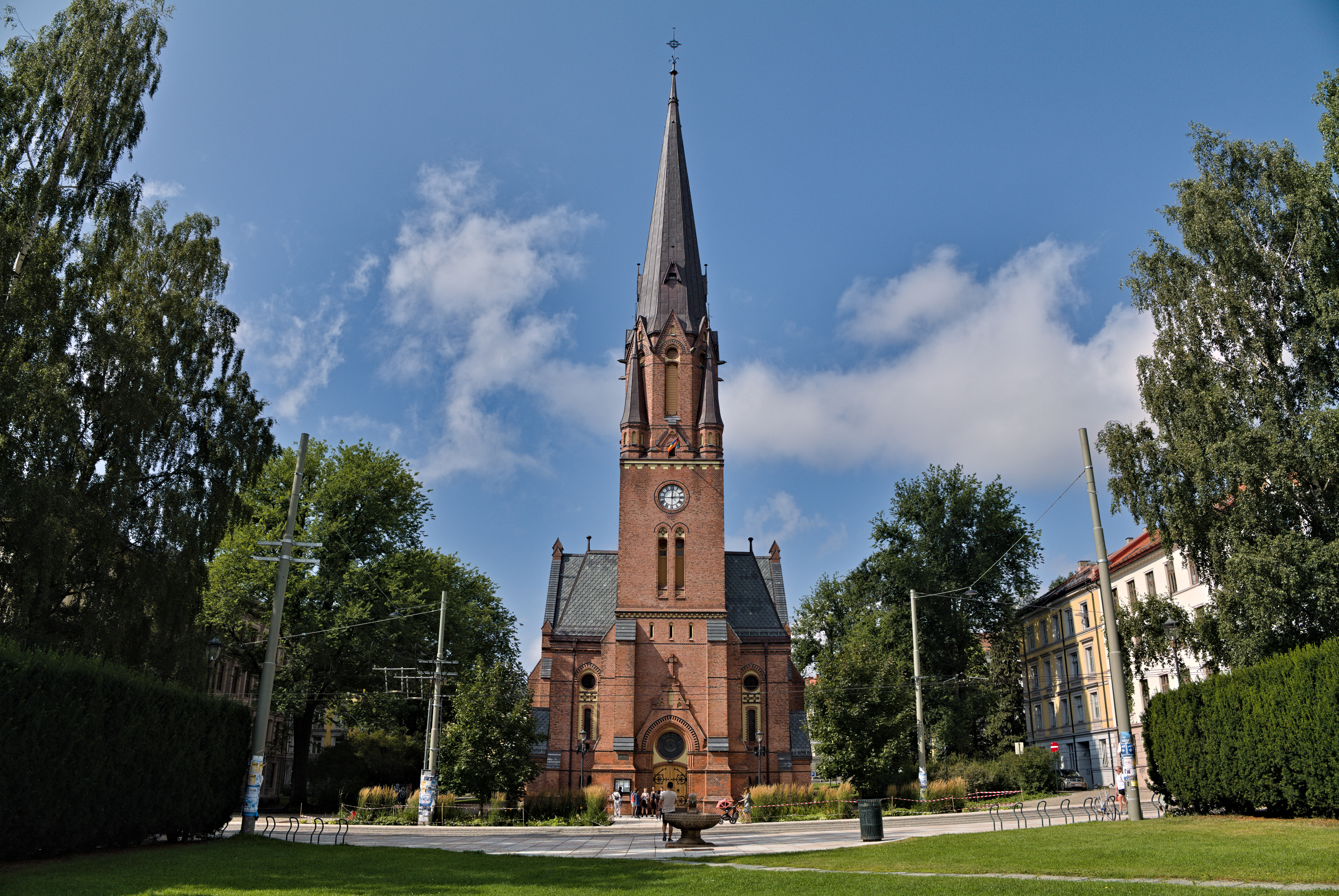
August 2022

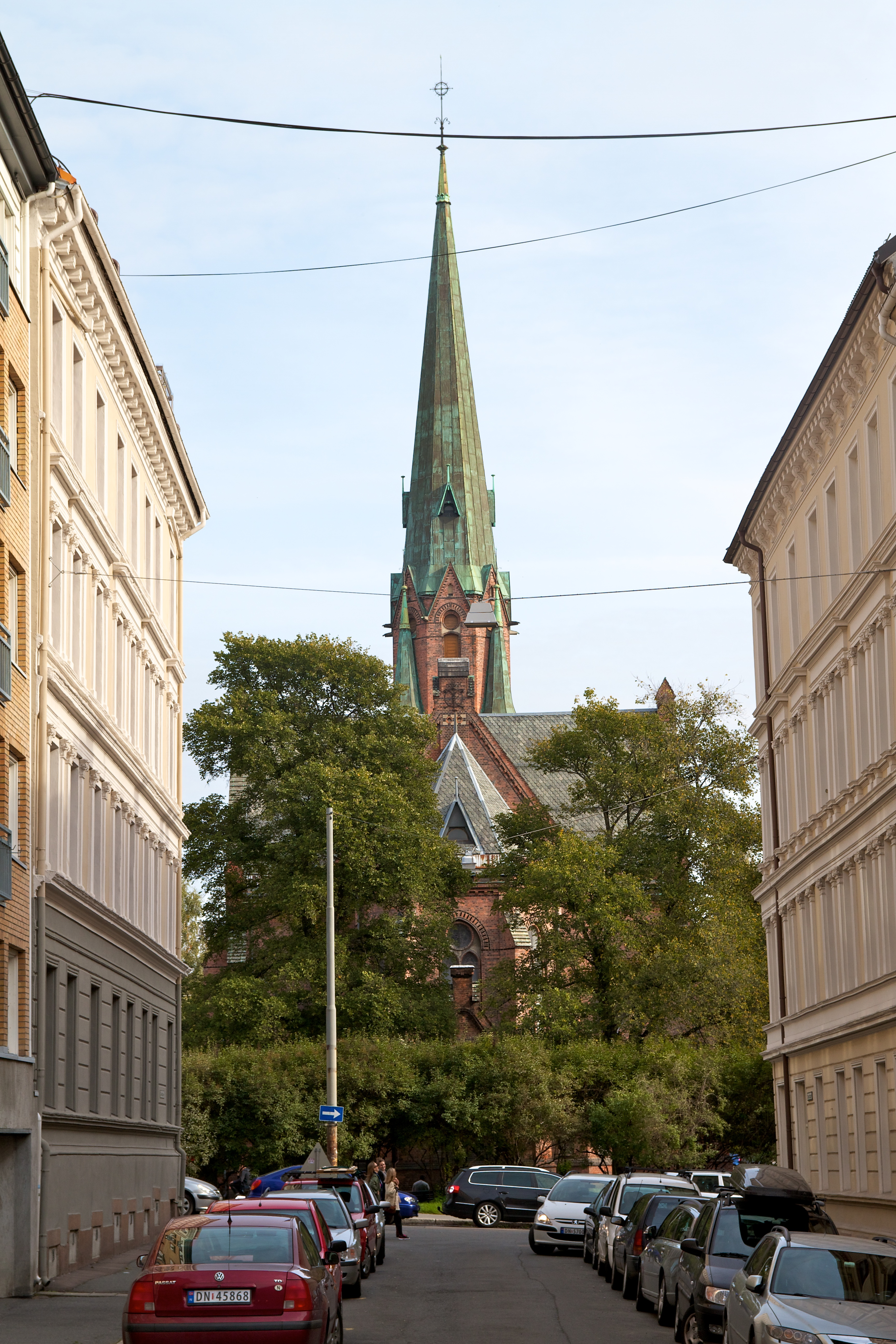
From west, 2011
