= Parkteatret =

Theatre in Oslo, Norway

Coordinates: 59°55′24.704″N 10°45′29.99″E

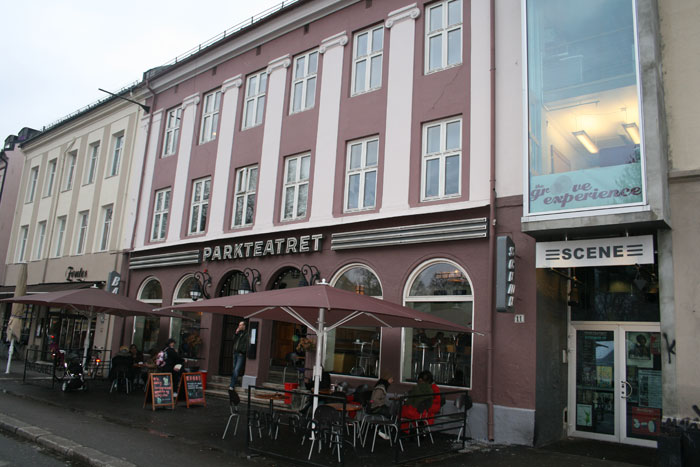
Parkteatret

Parkteatret is a theater located at Olaf Ryes plass 11, Grünerløkka in Oslo, Norway. It was established in 1907 as a cinema originally by the name "Kristiania Bryggeri Grünerløkkens Kinematograf". Parkteatret is renowned as an urban cultural heritage. In November 2007, Parkteatret was awarded the Olavsrosa seal of quality by the foundation Norsk Kulturarv.

== History ==
The cinema was designed by the architect Frithjof Aslesen (1854–1921). In 1913 the establishment changed its name to "Grünerløkkens Verdenstheater". In 1918–1922 it went through a major structural transformation and the cinema got its current name. The new facade was built in the neoclassical style by the architect Erik Glosimodt (1881–1921).

The artistic decoration of 1932 was done by the painter Paul Ansteinsson (1885–1939), simultaneously as architect Jens Dunker (1892–1981) redesigned the interior. The external neon lights were first switched on in the 1960s.

Parkteatret cinema was a municipal cinema from 1926 through 1991. From 1992 to 2001 the establishment housed the Nordic Black Theatre. In 2002 Parkteatret Scene started leasing the building, behind this new establishment was Geir Johnson, director of the Ultima Oslo Contemporary Music Festival, and Pål Steigan. Parkteatret Scene is owned by Grünerløkka kulturhus, which also runs Parkteatret Bar, a 1960s-inspired bar specializing in cocktails and craft beer. The company has continued to improve the interior design of the building along with architect Henrik E. Nielsen.
