= Alexander Kiellands plass (Oslo) =

Public square in Oslo, Norway

Coordinates: 59.9277°N 10.7504°E

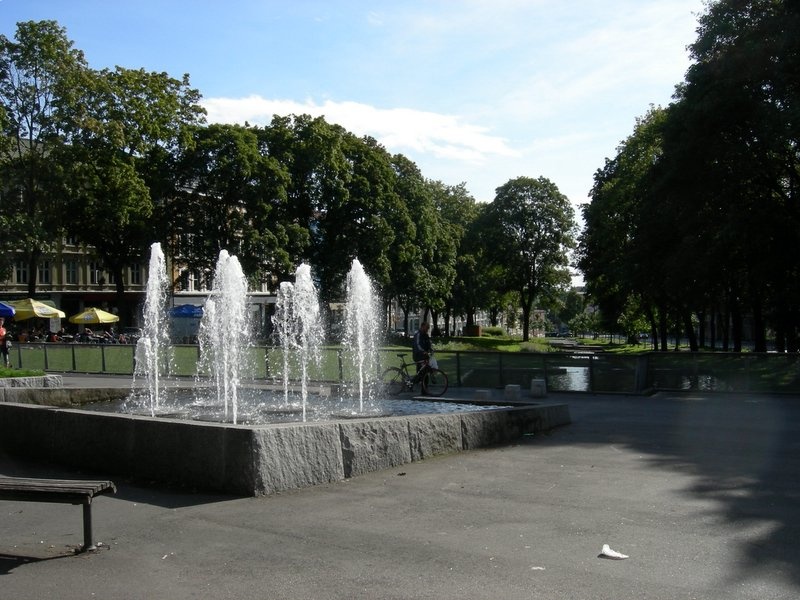
Alexander Kiellands plass seen from the end of Waldemar Thranes gate

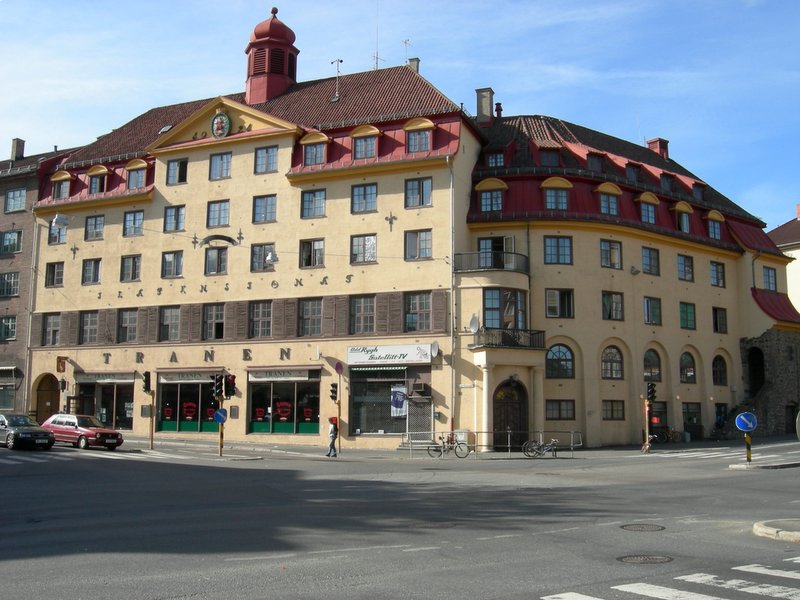
Ila pensjonat with Tranen seen from Kiellands plass

Alexander Kiellands plass is a square in Grünerløkka in Oslo, Norway. The square is located at Ila between Uelands gate, Maridalsveien and Waldemar Thranes gate, is 8,66 acres big and has the shape of a triangle with two long sides of ca. 260 meters and a short side of ca. 100 meters.

The square, from 1914, is named after the author Alexander Kielland (1849–1906) from Stavanger. Prior to this, the square was called Steinløkka. It was made into a park around 1920.

It is nearby a mall named Kjellands Hus. It is served by Bus Line 21, 33, 34, and 54.
