= Thorvald Meyer =

Norwegian businessman

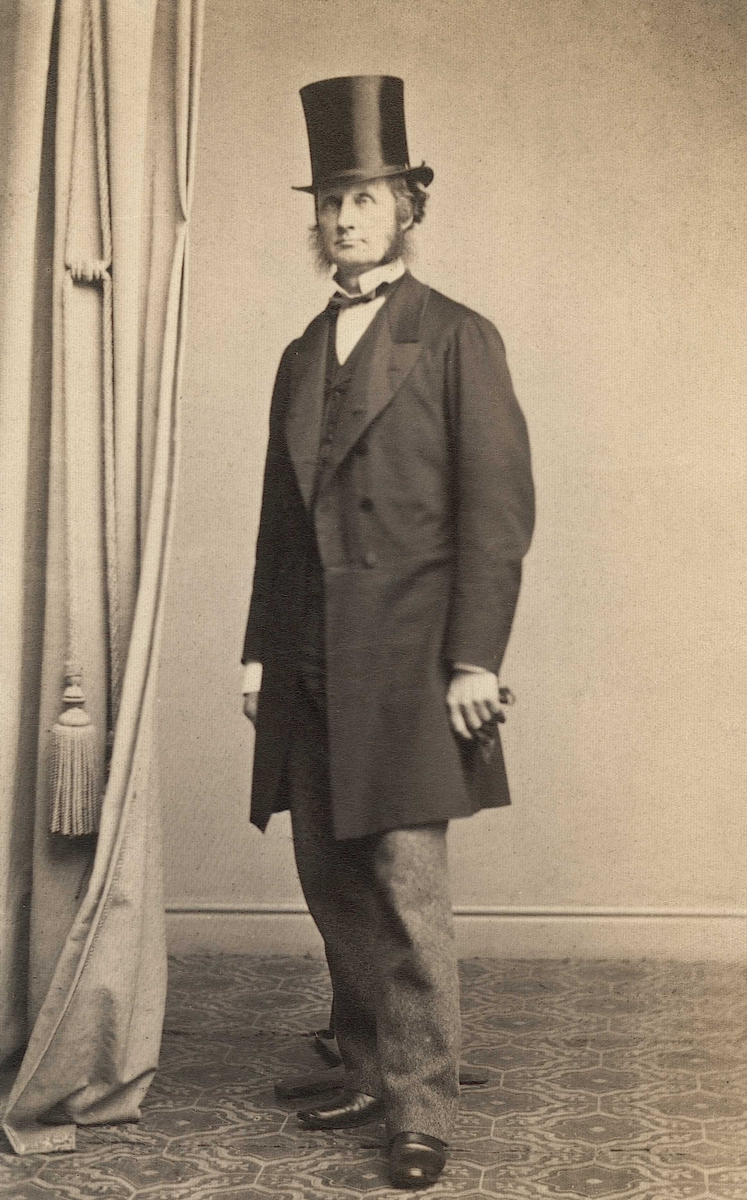
Thorvald Meyer. c. 1870–1880

Thorvald Meyer (23 September 1818 – 3 February 1909) was a Norwegian businessman and philanthropist. He was a wholesaler, retailer and shipowner as well as a land owner and developer.

== Biography ==
Meyer was born in Christiania (now Oslo), Norway. He was one of twelve children born to of Jacob Peter Meyer (1781–1856) and Ingeborg Marie Barth Muus (1781–1835). His father was a successful merchant, shipowner and timber wholesaler. As the son of a wealthy businessman, he received his education in France and England.

He entered the father's firm in 1848. He also became involved in the business enterprise of his wife's father, Andreas Tofte. In 1852, following the death of his father-in-law, he took over the family enterprises. In 1856, upon the death of his father, he inherited his father's company.

Thorvald Meyer also built a personal fortune primarily on real estate development in Oslo and also in forestry including forest properties at Nordre Odalen in Hedmark. He had inherited from his father, the southern part of Meyerløkka in the district of St. Hanshaugen. The property had been acquired by his father between 1807 and 1856. In 1859 he created a plan for the development of the property together with his brother-in-law, Thomas Johannessen Heftye (1822–1886).

In 1862, Meyer acquired and developed the then almost uninhabited area of Grünerløkka. Thorvald Meyers gate, one of the main thoroughfares running north to south through the district of Grünerløkka, was named in his honor.

== Personal life ==
Meyer was married to Annichen Mathea Tofte (1820–1900), daughter of Andreas Tofte (1795–1852) and Christine Søeberg (1797–1848). The couple resided in a property located at Karl Johans gate 37 in Oslo. The building had originally been owned by Andreas Tofte. After a fire in 1867, the building was destroyed. A new residence was completed for the family in 1869 based upon designs by architect Wilhelm von Hanno (1826–1882).

Their daughter Ragnhild Meyer (1849–1937) was married to diplomat Axel Heiberg (1848–1932). Their daughter Thea Meyer (1846–1922) was married to Prime Minister Christian Homann Schweigaard. And their daughter Ingeborg Meyer (1843–1882) was married to Lord Chamberlain Herman Severin Løvenskiold (1838–1910), the son of Otto Joachim Løvenskiold.

Meyer donated several of his properties to the city. He was also a supporter of the arts, in particular the theater. Thorvald Meyer was appointed Commander of the 1st Class of Order of St. Olav. He died during 1909 and was buried at Vår Frelsers Gravlund in Oslo.
