= Grand Hotel (Oslo) =

Hotel in Oslo, Norway

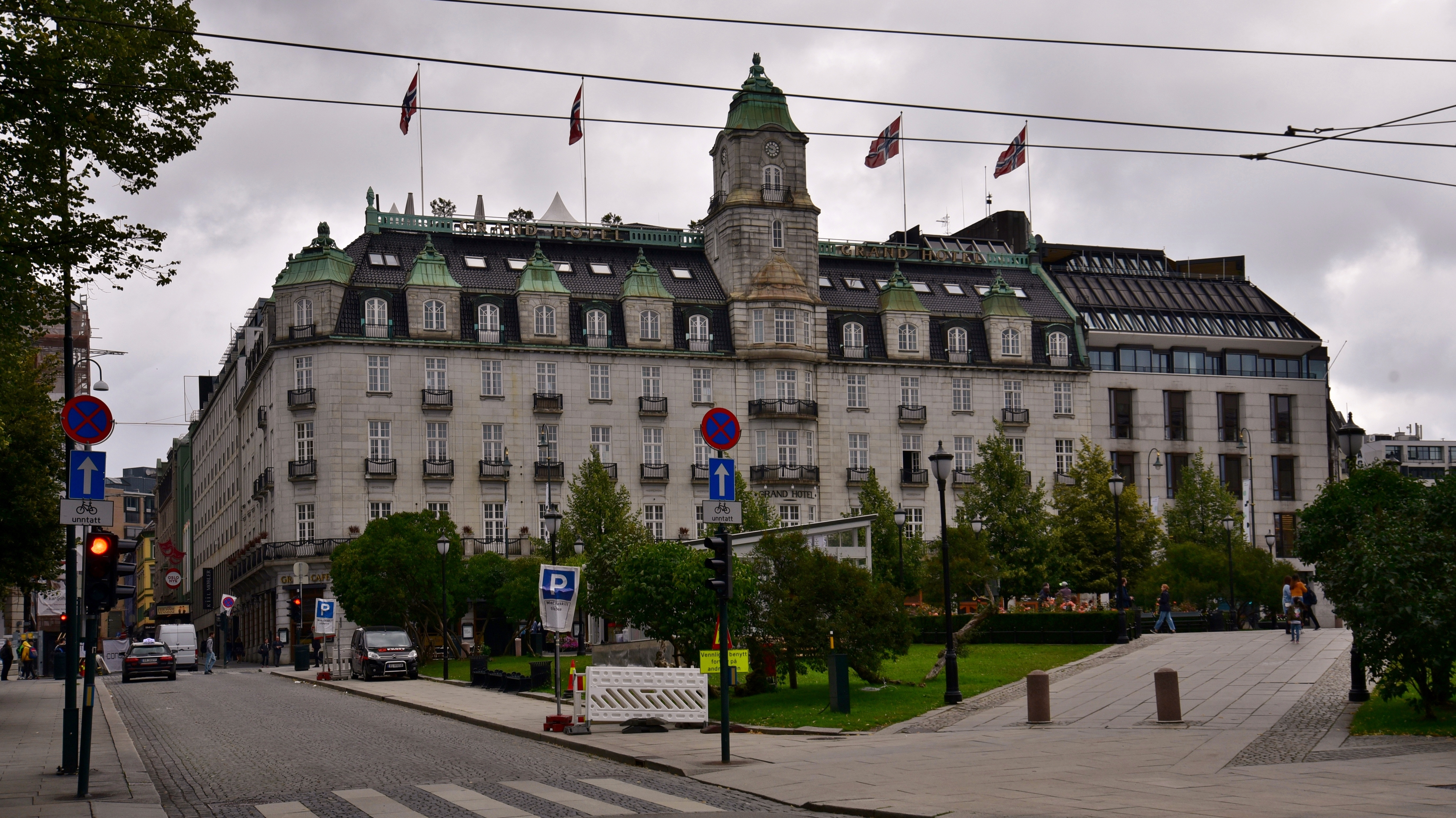

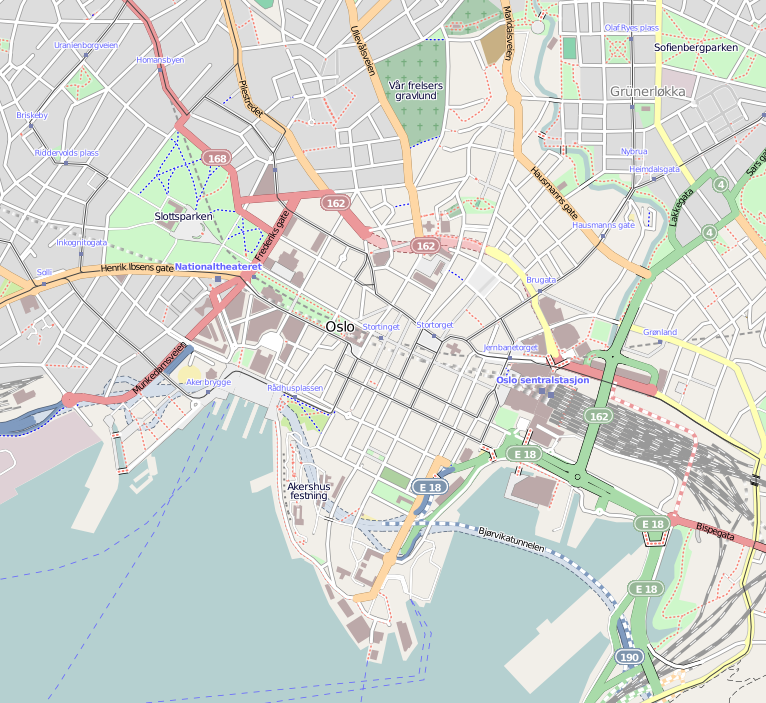
- Location within Central Oslo

General information
- Coordinates: 59°54′49″N 10°44′22″E
- Opening: 1874

Grand Hotel is a hotel in Oslo, Norway. The hotel is best known as the annual venue of the Nobel Peace Prize awarding ceremonies and banquet, and its winners' residence while in Oslo.

== History ==
Grand Hotel is situated in a very central location on the main thoroughfare, the Karl Johans gate, between the Norwegian Parliament building and the Royal Palace. It is within walking distance to Oslo's main shopping and cultural areas, as well as its sights. The hotel was opened in 1874 and is one of the most traditional hotels in Norway.

Each year the hotel hosts the annual Nobel Peace Prize banquet, and the prize winners stay in the Nobel suite at the hotel. Roald Dahl stayed in the hotel when he was young, and where his inspiration came from to write his 1984 autobiographical book, Boy: Tales of Childhood.

The hotel has several restaurants. These include Grand Café, where Henrik Ibsen used to eat every day; the "Restaurant Julius Fritzner", named after Julius Fritzner, the man who founded the hotel in 1874; and "Palmen Restaurant", a traditional and stylish lunch restaurant.

Grand Hotel is a classical style building with white granite facade and clock tower. The hotel has 290 rooms. The hotel is affiliated with Rica Hotels, a chain of approximately 90 hotels located in Norway and Sweden.
