= Eidsvolls plass =

Square and park in Oslo, Norway

Coordinates: 59.9133°N 10.7390°E

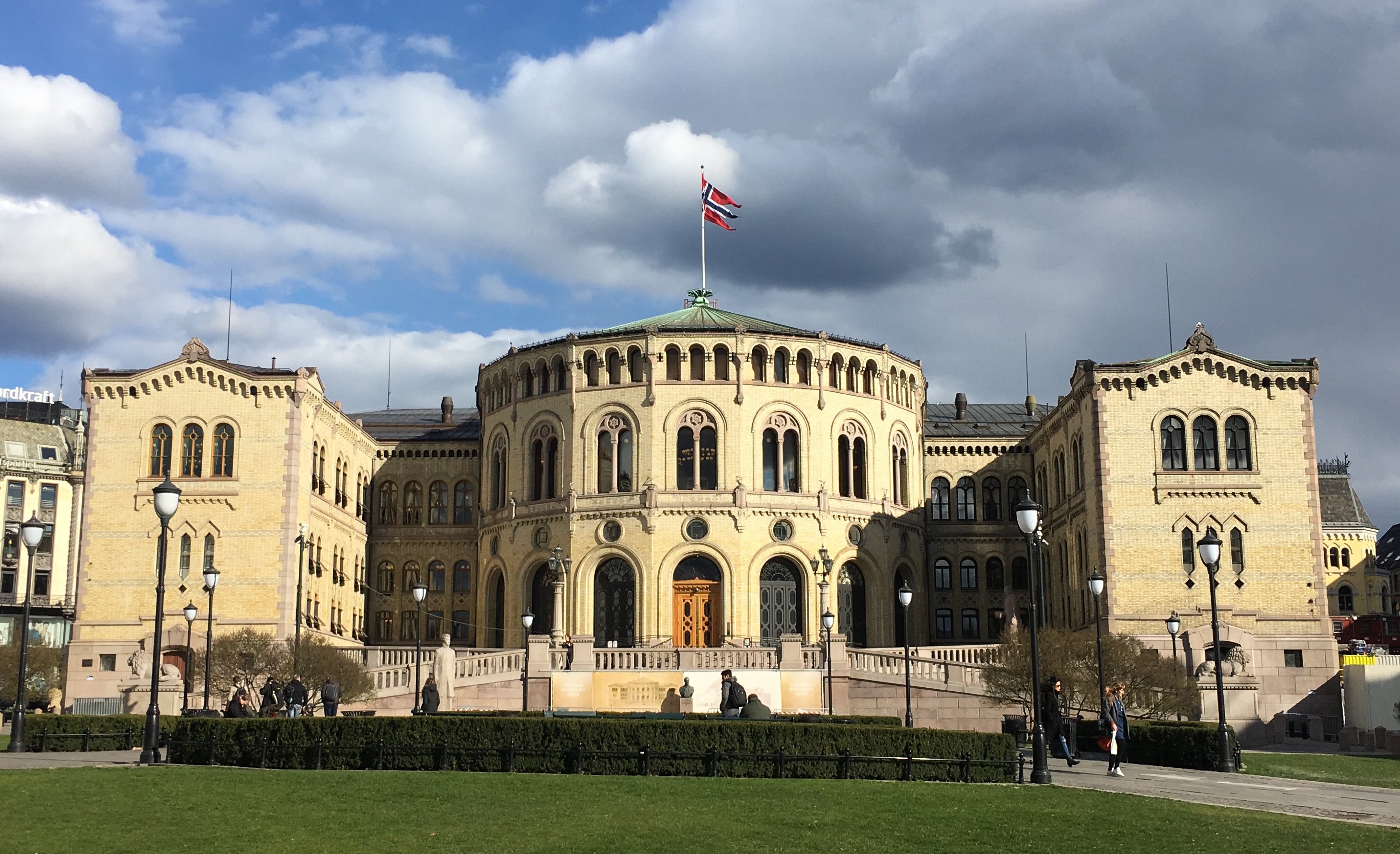
The Parliament of Norway Building seen from Eidsvolls plass

Eidsvolls plass ("Eidsvoll Square") is a square and park in Oslo, Norway, located west of the Parliament of Norway Building, south of Karl Johans gate and east of Studenterlunden and the National Theatre. It has been referred to as "the National Mall of Norway".

== History ==
=== Early history ===
It was originally a marshy place, but became a park around the same time as buildings were raised in the street Karl Johans gate, and the street Stortingsgata was built in the south, cutting across the marsh. It was preserved as a park because house owners in Karl Johans gate did not want tall buildings on the other side of the street. In 1864, around the time the Parliament of Norway Building was under construction, the park was given its current name, inspired by Eidsvoll where the Constitution of Norway was drafted and signed by the Norwegian Constituent Assembly.

=== Event of 1881 ===
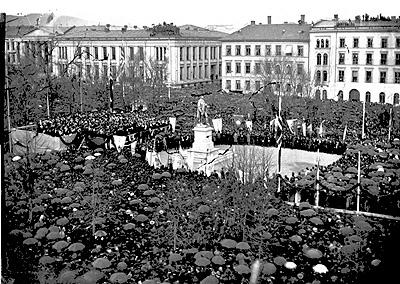
Unveiling ceremony in 1881

A statue of Henrik Wergeland, sculpted by Brynjulf Bergslien, was raised here in 1881. It was unveiled on 17 May 1881, Norwegian Constitution Day, in a highly politicized atmosphere with a speech by Bjørnstjerne Bjørnson. For many years Wergeland had been portrayed as a wordsmith first and foremost, especially by his first biographer (1866) Hartvig Lassen, but on the other hand, liberals such as Olaf Skavlan and Erik Vullum saw Wergeland as a political character, a forerunner within their own ideology. Political conservatives staunchly opposed that Bjørnson be holding the speech, and submitted other candidates, but were subdued. They had already provoked the liberals in 1880, when a statue of Christian IV of Denmark was unveiled at Stortorvet. The speech was thus held by Bjørnson, and attended by 50,000 people. This crowd included at least 2,000 countryfolk, from Østerdal and elsewhere, and became a contribution to the liberals' nation-building project. Other statues, including one of Bjørnstjerne Bjørnson, are found in the vicinity. Because of its density of national symbols, Sigurd Aa. Aarnes has referred to Eidsvolls plass as "the National Mall of Norway".

=== Later history ===
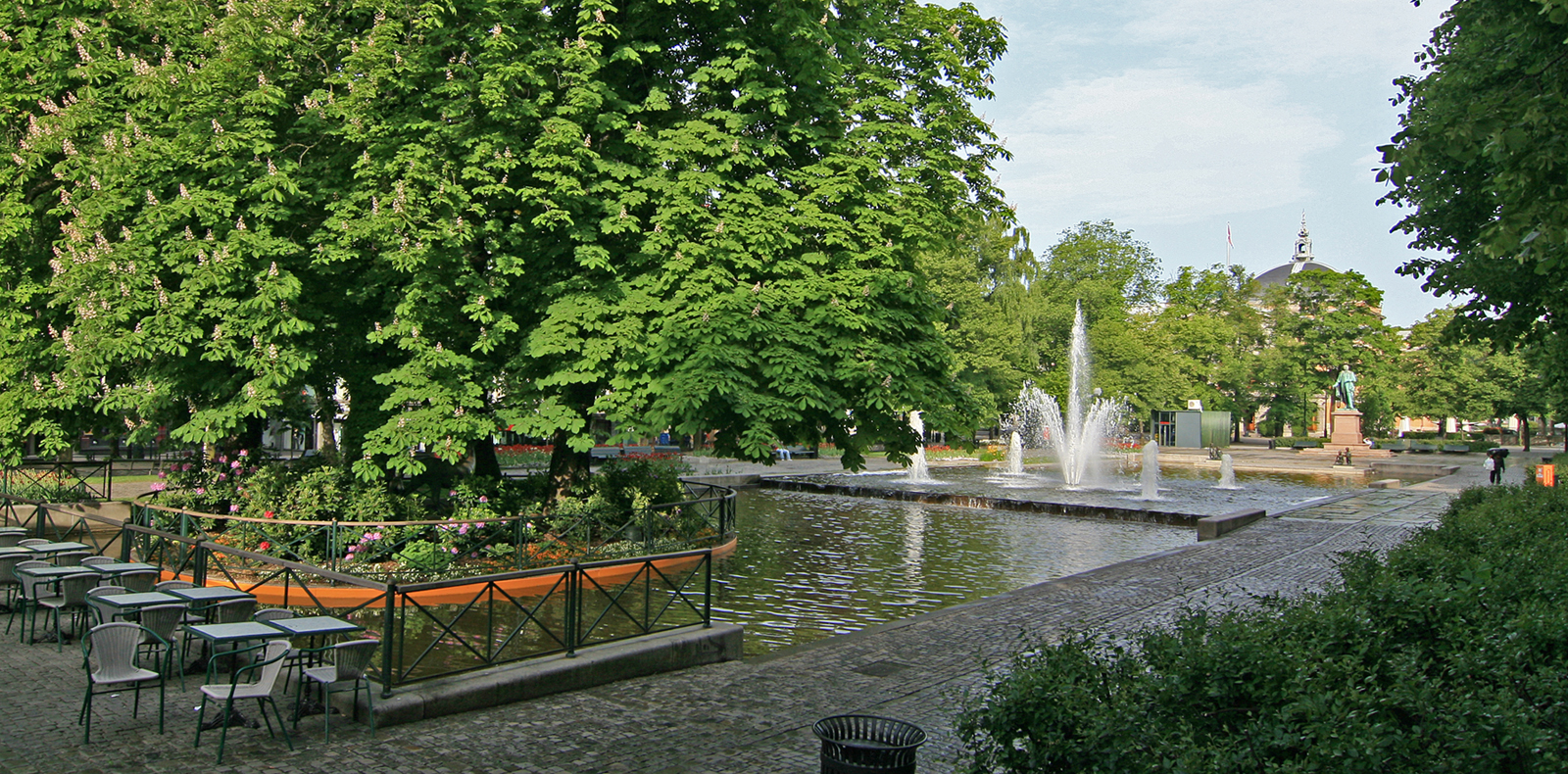
The Spikersuppa pool

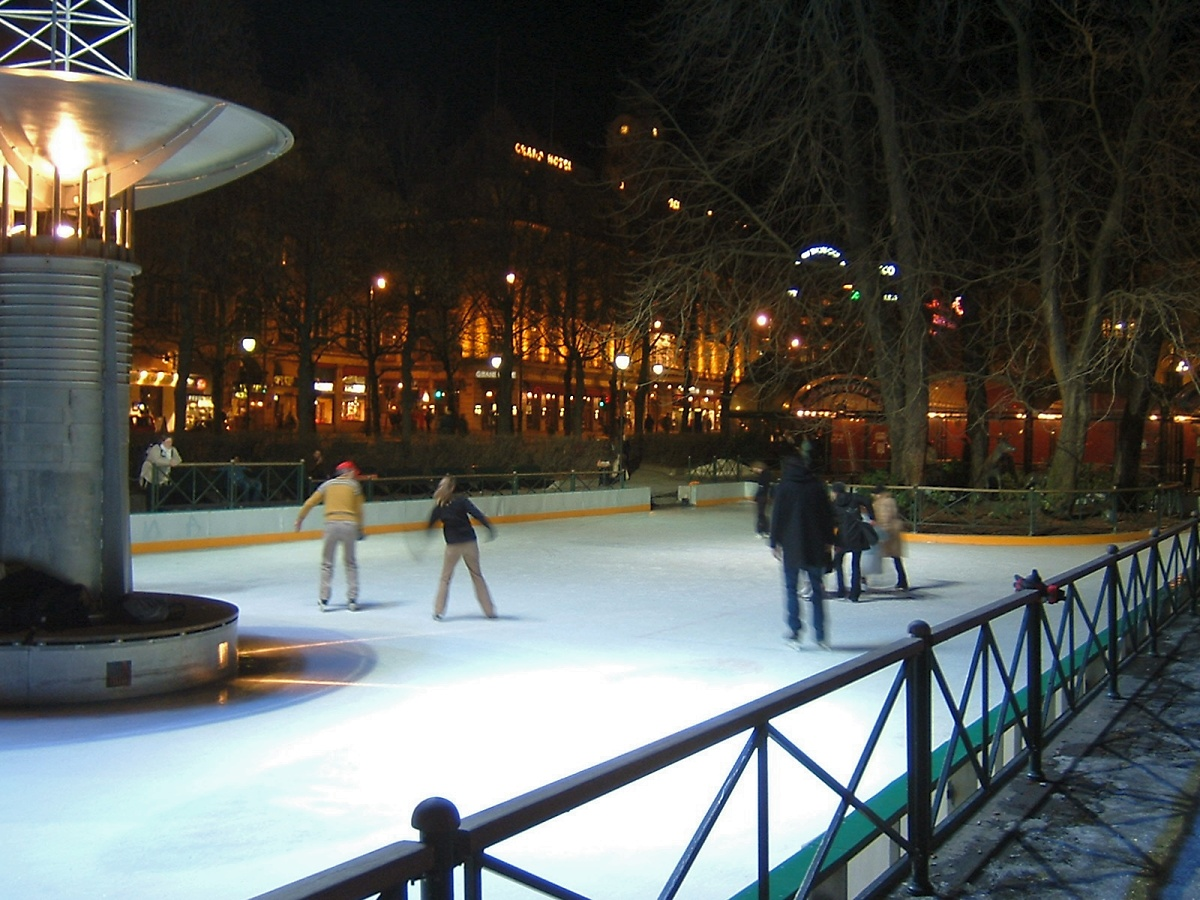
Ice skating at Eidsvolls plass

In 1956, a plan by architect Arnstein Arneberg was set into motion, creating a decorative pool of water at Eidsvolls plass. Funded by the company Christiania Spigerverk (spikerverk means "nail factory"), it was humorously nicknamed Spikersuppa ("nail soup"). The pool has a fountain in the middle, and since 1958 a group of trees as well as a statue of deer in the west. The pool was enlarged by 25% in 1976, and since 1994 it is used as a skating rink during the winter.

== Transportation ==
The square is served by Wessels plass station on the Oslo Tramway, Stortinget station on the Oslo Metro as well as an eponymous bus station.
