= Julius Fritzner =

Norwegian restaurateur and hotelier

Julius Christopher Fritzner (28 December 1828 – 12 February 1882) was a Norwegian restaurateur and hotelier.

He was born in Skjeberg as a son of Niels Dorph Heide Fritzner (1783–1832) and Nicoline Christine Schwartz Bremer (1793–1864). He had five siblings. In 1861 he moved to Christiania and ran a tea room at different locations as well as the cafe in Frimurerlogen. In 1865 he opened a dining pavilion in Studenterlunden, for use during the summer. In 1873 his brother bought a building in the adjacent street Karl Johans gate, and the Grand Hotel and Grand Café was opened in 1874. Julius Fritzner owned the building from 1878. The cafe became a central meeting point in the cultural life of Christiania (from 1924: Oslo).

Since 1858 Fritzner was married to Else Marie Caroline Strøm (1829–1865), a sister of Steen & Strøm owner Samuel Strøm. When Fritzner died in February 1882, his son Christian Fritzner took over.
