= Storting building =

Seat of the Storting, the parliament of Norway

The Parliament
- Stortingsbygningen (in Norwegian)
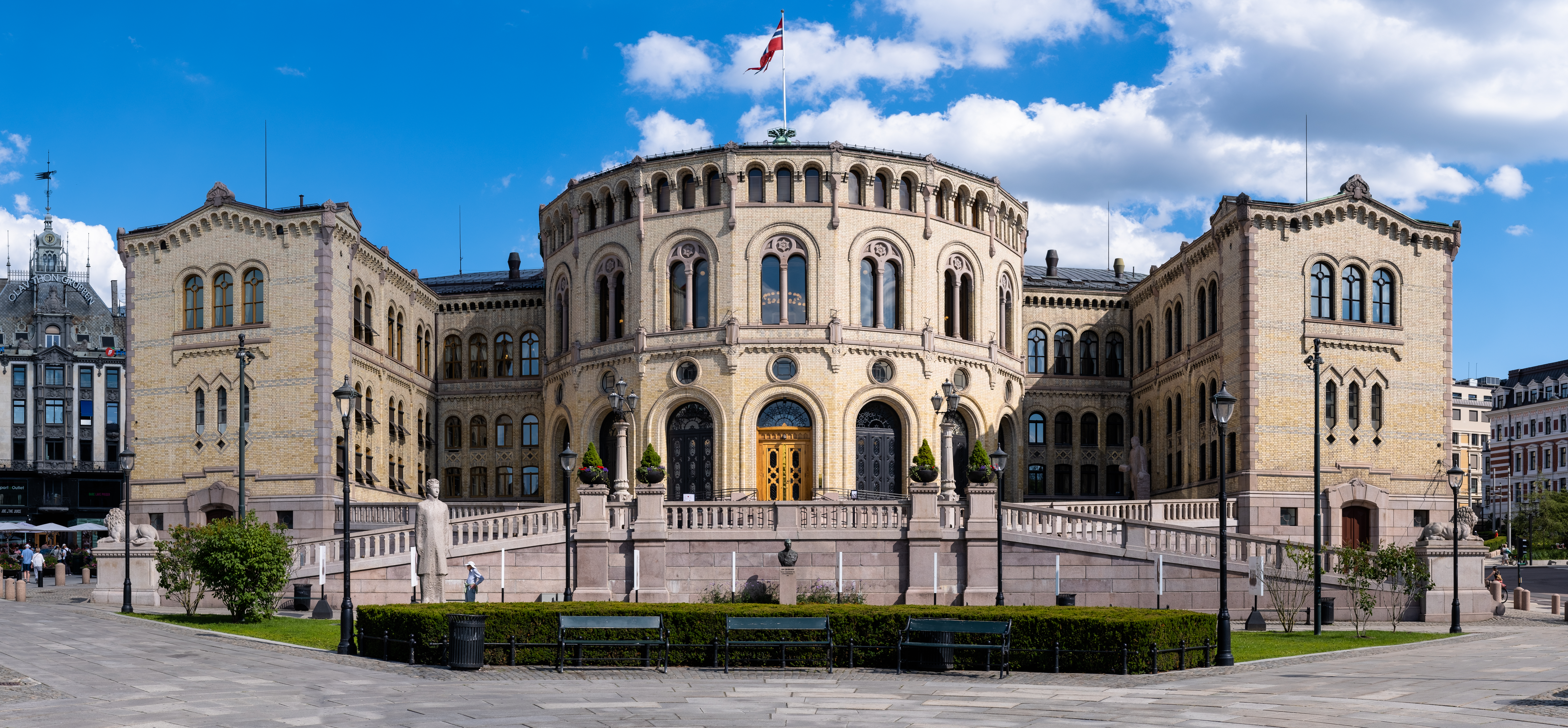
- The front of the building

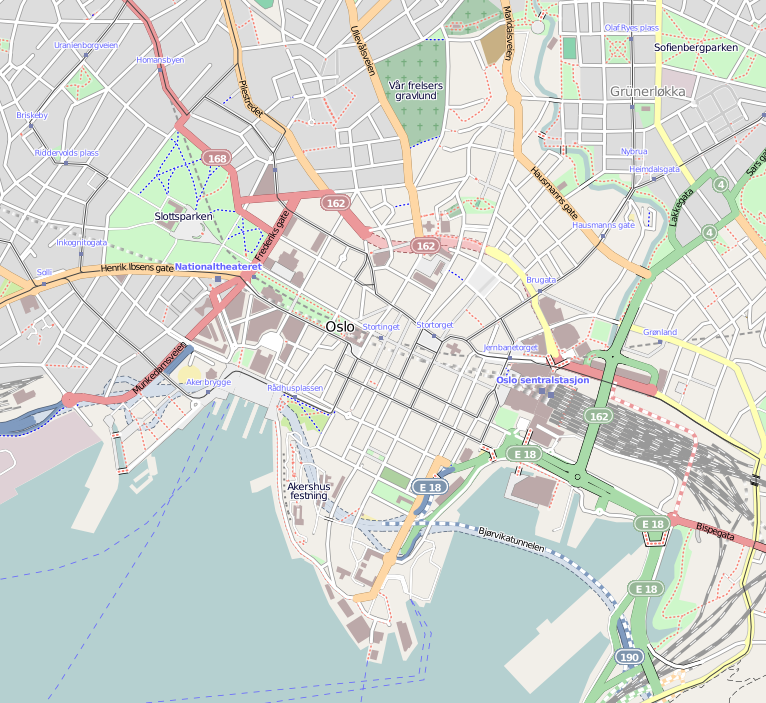
- Location within Central Oslo

General information
- Architectural style: Eclectic
- Location: Oslo, Norway, Karl Johans gate 22
- Coordinates: 59°54′47″N 10°44′24″E
- Current tenants: Parliament of Norway
- Construction started: 3 August 1860
- Inaugurated: 5 March 1866; 160 years ago
- Cost: 68,061,444 kr

Design and construction
- Architect: Emil Victor Langlet

The Storting building (Norwegian: Stortingsbygningen) is the seat of the Storting, the parliament of Norway. The building is located at Karl Johans gate 22 in central Oslo, Norway. It was taken into use on 5 March 1866 and was designed by the Swedish architect Emil Victor Langlet.

== History ==
Following the establishment of the Parliament of Norway in 1814, which had happened at a private home belonging to Carsten Anker in Eidsvoll, the newly established legislature started meeting at Christiania lærde Skole at Tollbodgaten and Dronningsgate. From 1854, the legislature started using the grand hall at the Royal Frederick University. However, proposals of an own parliament building had arisen. The parliament voted down a government proposal to create such a building in 1833, but in 1836, the work to establish a permanent building started. Twelve lots in central Oslo were combined, located between the Royal Palace and Oslo East Station. The government decided to build in the Palace Park, and this was passed by the parliament. However, instead the government chose to purchase the current lot instead. This was approved by parliament in 1857.

The next discussion was related to the architecture. Several proposals were made, and twelve of these have been preserved. A design competition was initiated in 1856, and this was won by the architects Heinrich Ernst Schirmer and Wilhelm von Hanno. However, the Storting decided to reject the proposal because it looked too much like a church. Instead, a proposal from the Swedish architect Emil Victor Langlet was chosen with 59 against 47 votes on 18 May 1860. Construction started on 3 August 1860, and the cornerstone was laid on 10 October 1861. The building cost 957,332 kr (68 061 444 kr in 2019). The parliament moved in on 5 March 1866.

Initially, the building was too large for the needs of the legislature, and several other government agencies, including the Office of the Auditor General of Norway, the National Archival Services, the Mapping and Cadastre Authority and the Director of Canals were also housed there. As the parliament has expanded, these various agencies have moved out.

During the German invasion of Norway on 9 April 1940, the Storting relocated and held two meetings, once in a cinema in Hamar and once at Elverum Folk High School (Elverum folkehøgskole). The remaining meetings during World War II were held abroad. During the war, the building was taken over by the German forces, and at first used as barracks. Later, Reichskommissar Josef Terboven with administration moved into the building. The Lagting Chamber was refurnished, with the ceiling lowered and the interior redecorated with mahogany panels and funkis style.

From 1951 to 1959, a four-story office building was built at the back of the building. The courtyard was filled in, and the chamber expanded. This work was led by architect Nils Holter (1899-1995). In 1872, parliament bought Prinsens gate 26, in 1988 they bought Akersgata 21, in 1993 Nedre Vollgate 20, in 1997 Nedre Vollgate 18 and in 1999 Tollbugaten 31. The parliament also rents offices in Akersgata 18.

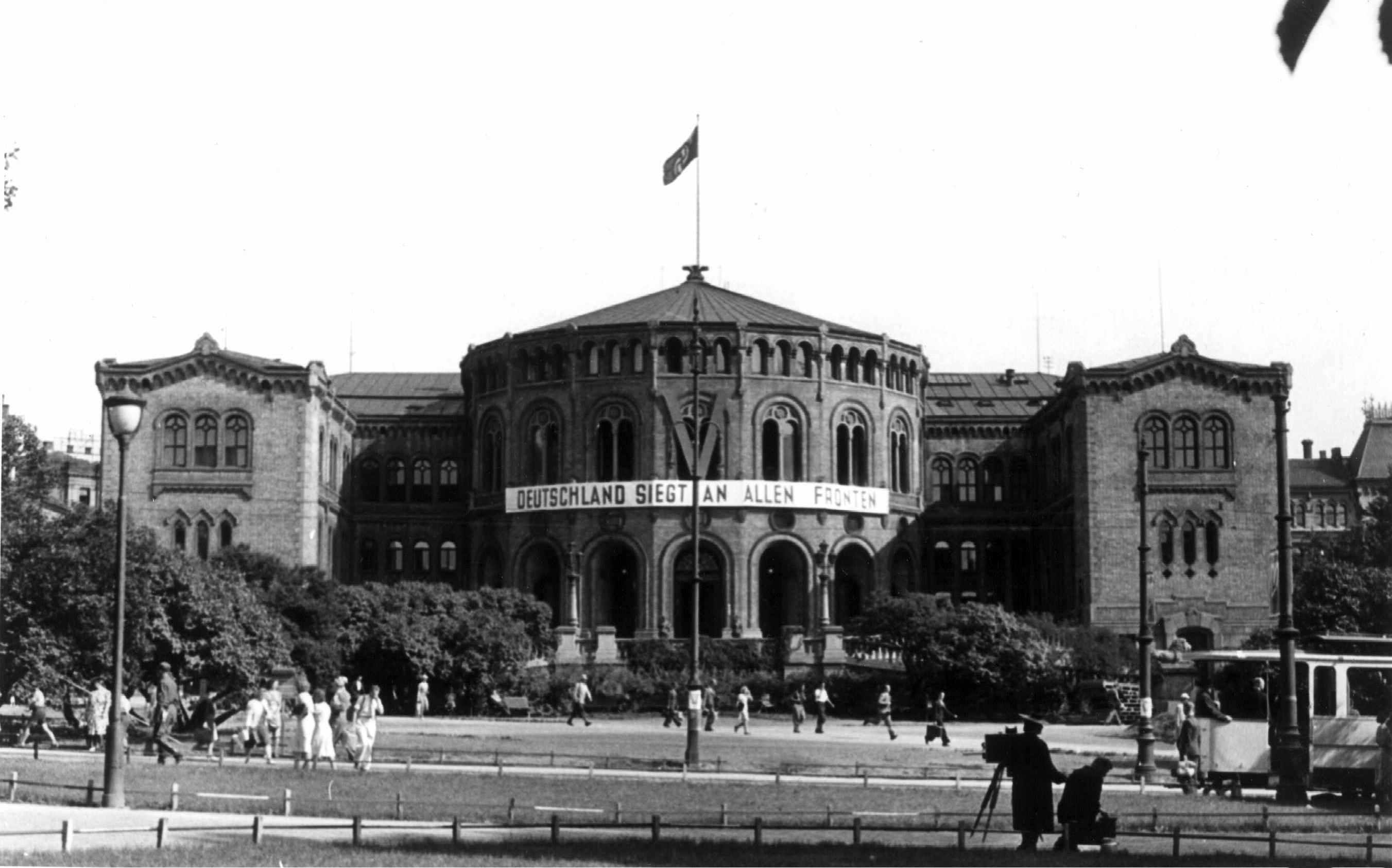
The Nazi-German flag flying over the Storting building during the German occupation. A V sign and a banner reading (in German) "Germany is Victorious on All Fronts" were added to the façade.

== Architecture ==
The building is built in yellow brick with details and basement in light gray granite. It is a combination of several styles, including inspirations from France and Italy. A characteristic feature of Stortingsbygningen is the way the plenary chamber is located in the semi-circular section in the front of the building, as opposed to the building's centre. The back side of the building mirrors the facade of the front, with the meeting chamber of the now-abolished Lagting legislative chamber. The interior of the building is also designed by Langlet.

The inclining roads leading up to the entrance plateau from Karl Johans gate and Stortingsgata is called Løvebakken (en: The Lions Hill). It is named after the two lion statues on both sides, which (since 1865) have been guarding the inclining roads. The lions were designed by Norwegian sculptor Christopher Borch and carved into nordmarkite granite by the convicts Søren Andersen Buskerudseie and Theodor Pedersen Vøyen. One or both of the lion sculptures might have also been carved out by another convict; Gulbrand Eriksen Mørstad. Løvebakken is also sometimes used as a phrase to refer to the Storting and the decisions made there.

== Gallery ==
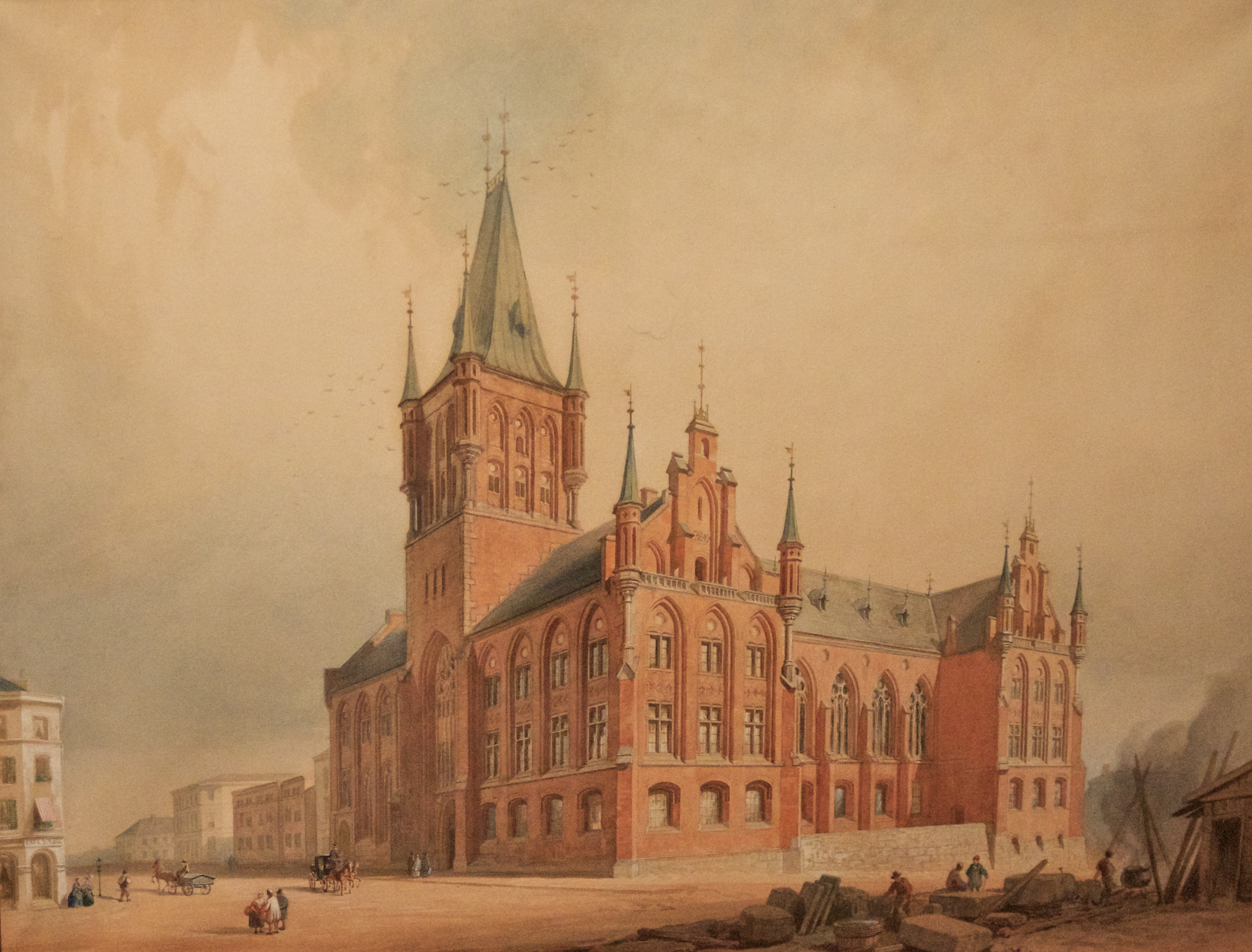
The proposal by Heinrich Ernst Schirmer and Wilhelm von Hanno that won the 1856 competition, but was finally rejected

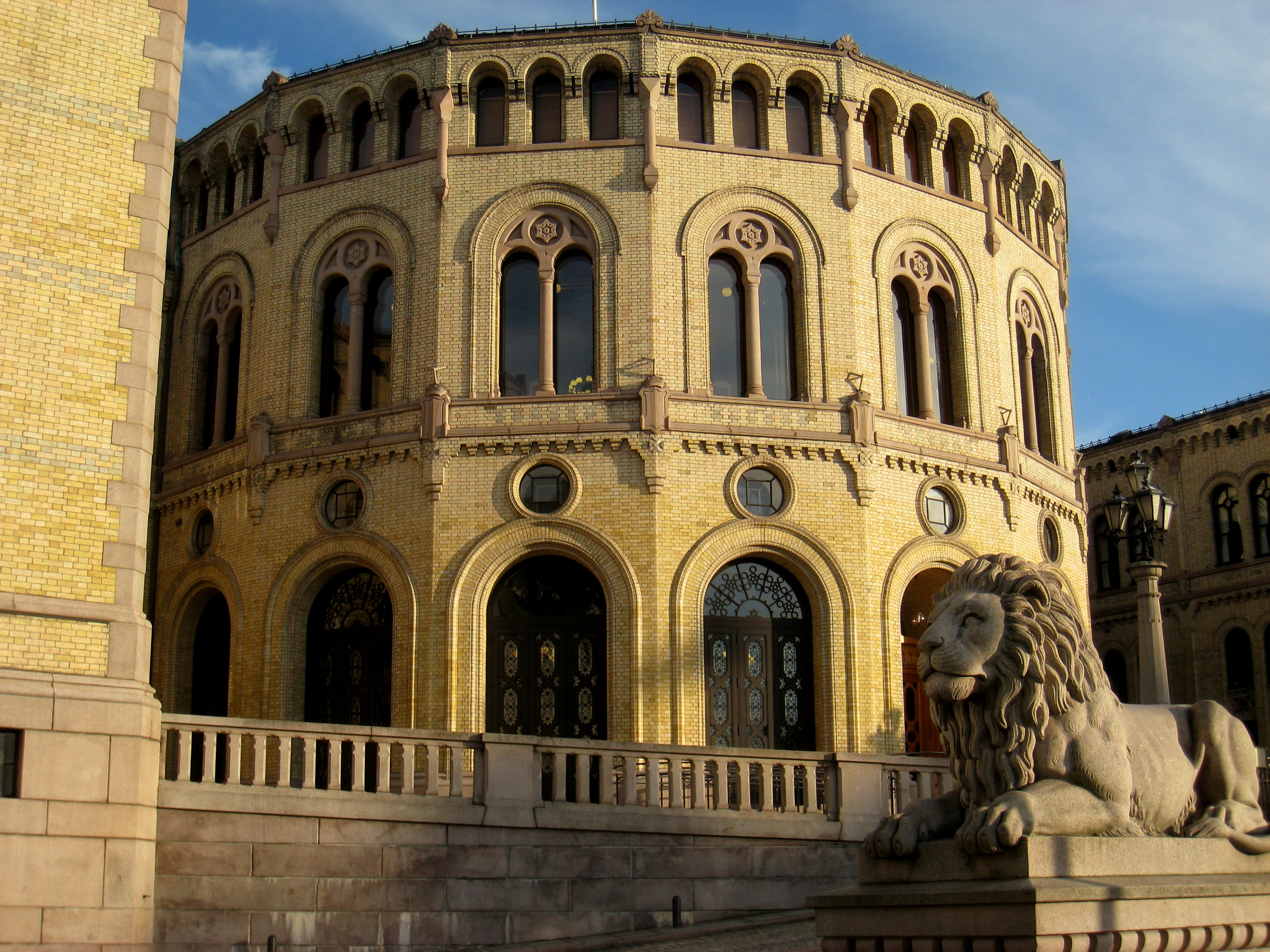
Exterior detail

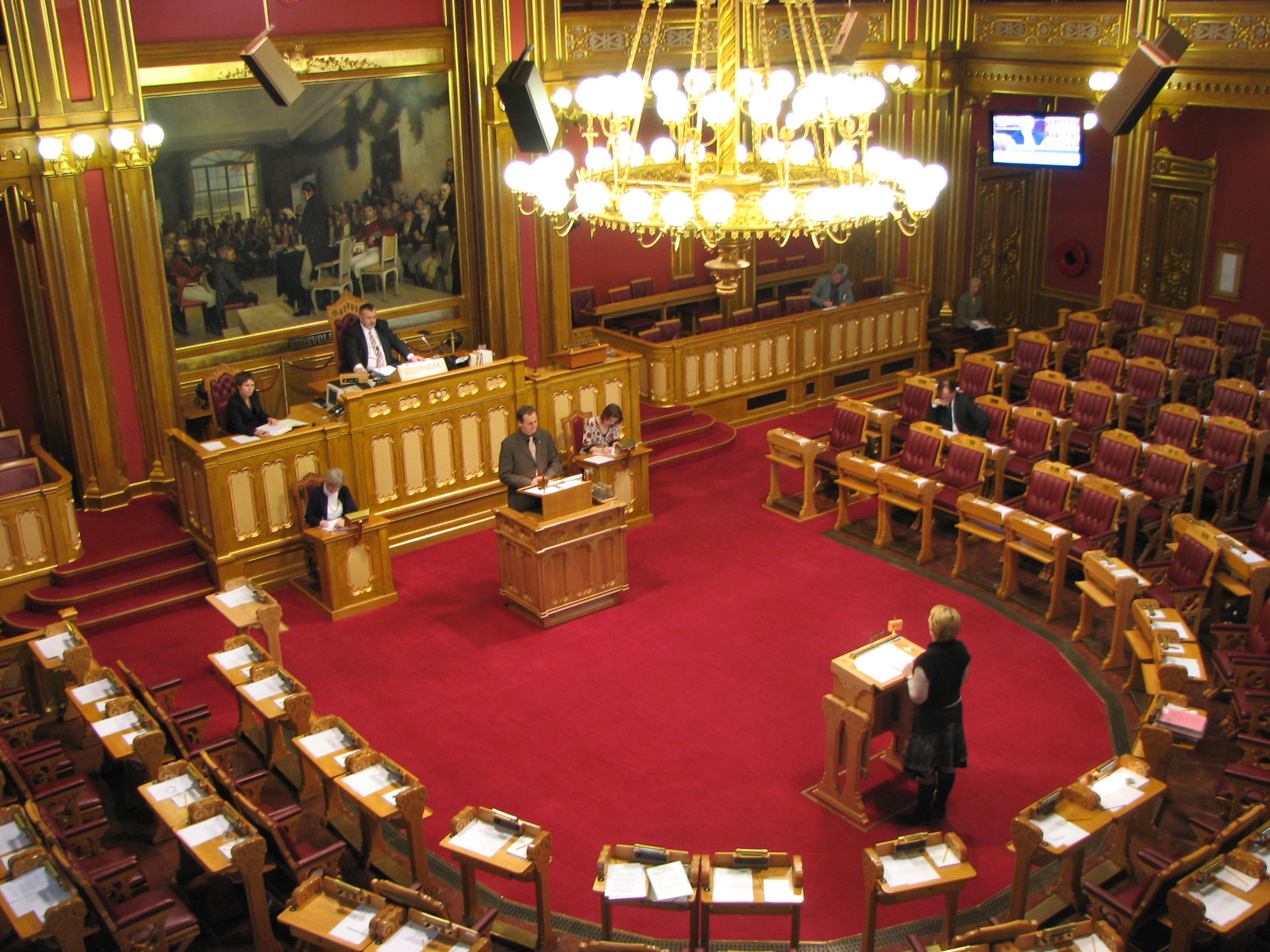
Interior of the Plenary Chamber
