= Anatomigården =

House in Oslo, Norway

Coordinates: 59°54′22.14″N 10°44′14.97″E

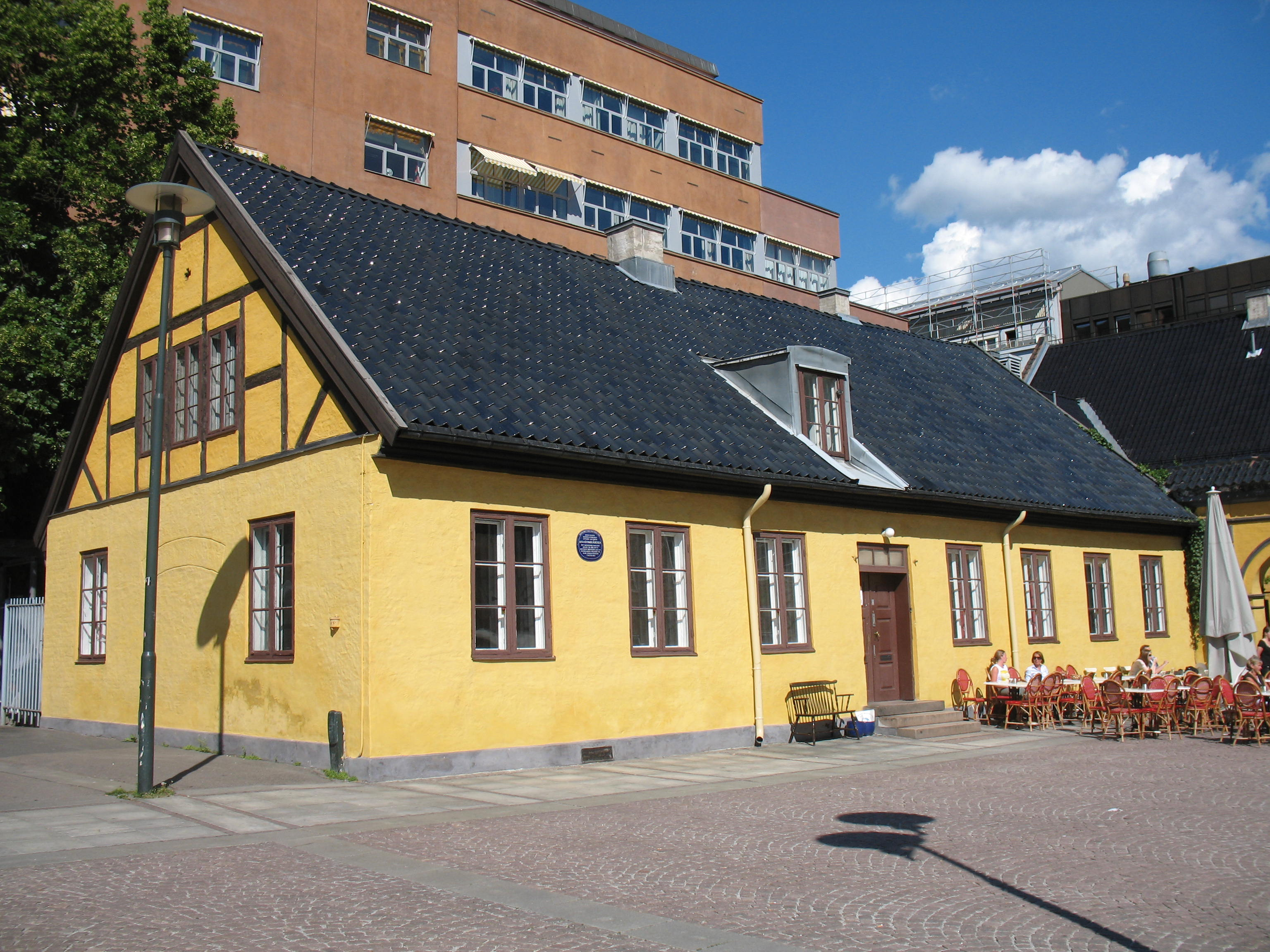
Anatomigården (June 2007)

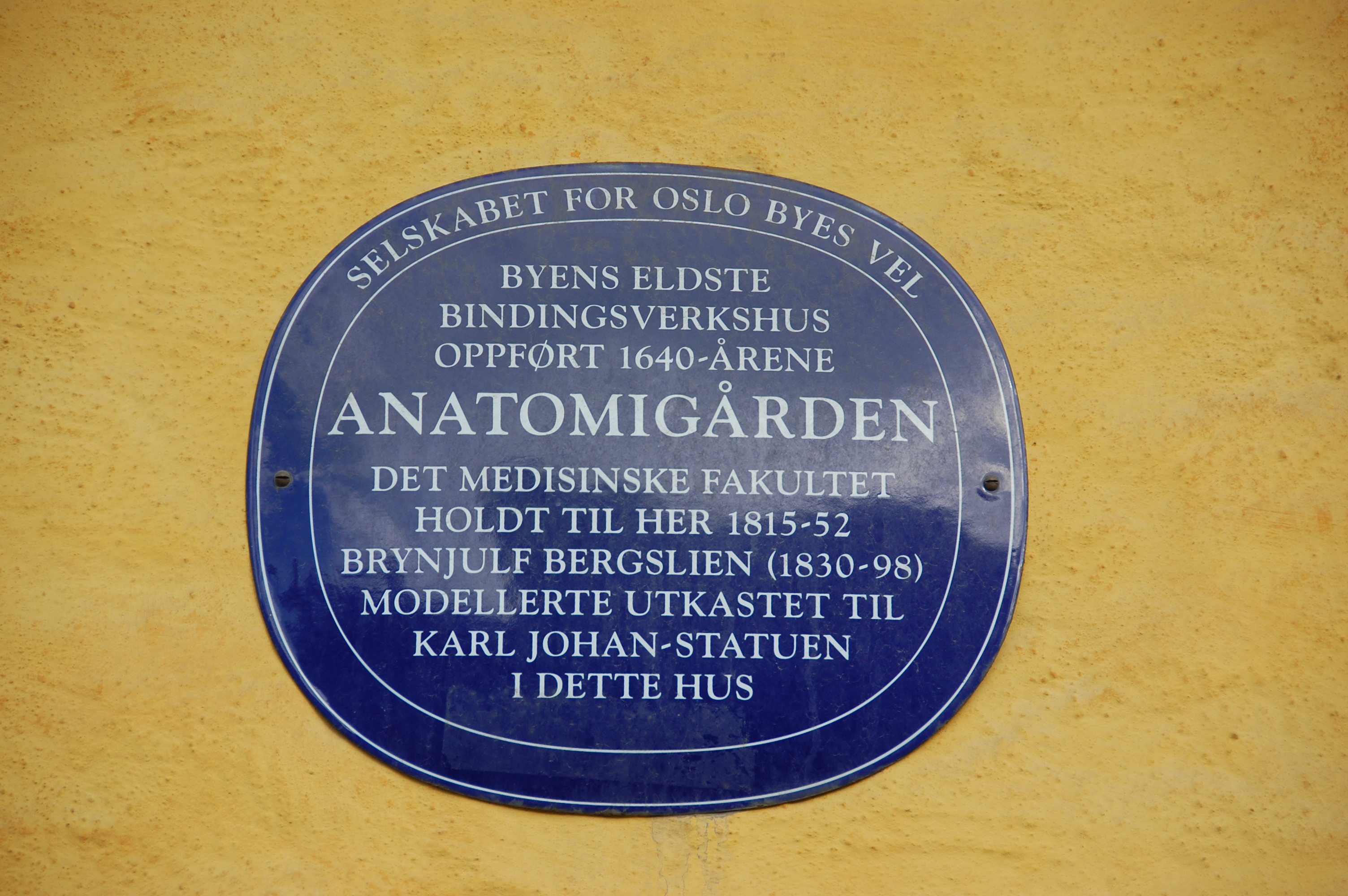
Anatomigården Cultural Heritage plaque

Anatomigården is a historic house located on the north side of Christiania Torv in Oslo, Norway.

== History ==
Antanomigården is located at Christiania Torv, in an area in Oslo's old city center known as Kvadraturen. Built in 1640, it is one of the city's oldest half-timbered house built with the timber framing method. It is in an area where about 50% of the buildings were half-timbered in the middle of 18th century. The facades (brick walls) of the building are sanded and covered with layers of protective rock materials, so the timbers are only visible on the gables. The age is unknown, but the house is likely to be from the 17th century. It is conserved, like the adjacent historic building, Rådmannsgården.

In the 1800s, the Faculty of Medicine of University of Oslo had its division of anatomy here - hence the name Anatomigården (meaning " Anatomy House"). The building served as a headquarters for this faculty until a new building was erected on the main University campus at Blindern. From around 1860 the sculptor Brynjulf Bergslien had the studio in the building. Until 2003, the house was used by the Young Artists' Society (Unge Kunstneres Samfund).

Since 2015 it has housed the gallery and office of the union BOA (The Association of Artists in Oslo and Akershus) on its premises.

== See also ==
- History of Norway
