= Palace Park =

Public park by the Royal Palace in Oslo, Norway

Coordinates: 59.9175°N 10.7283°E

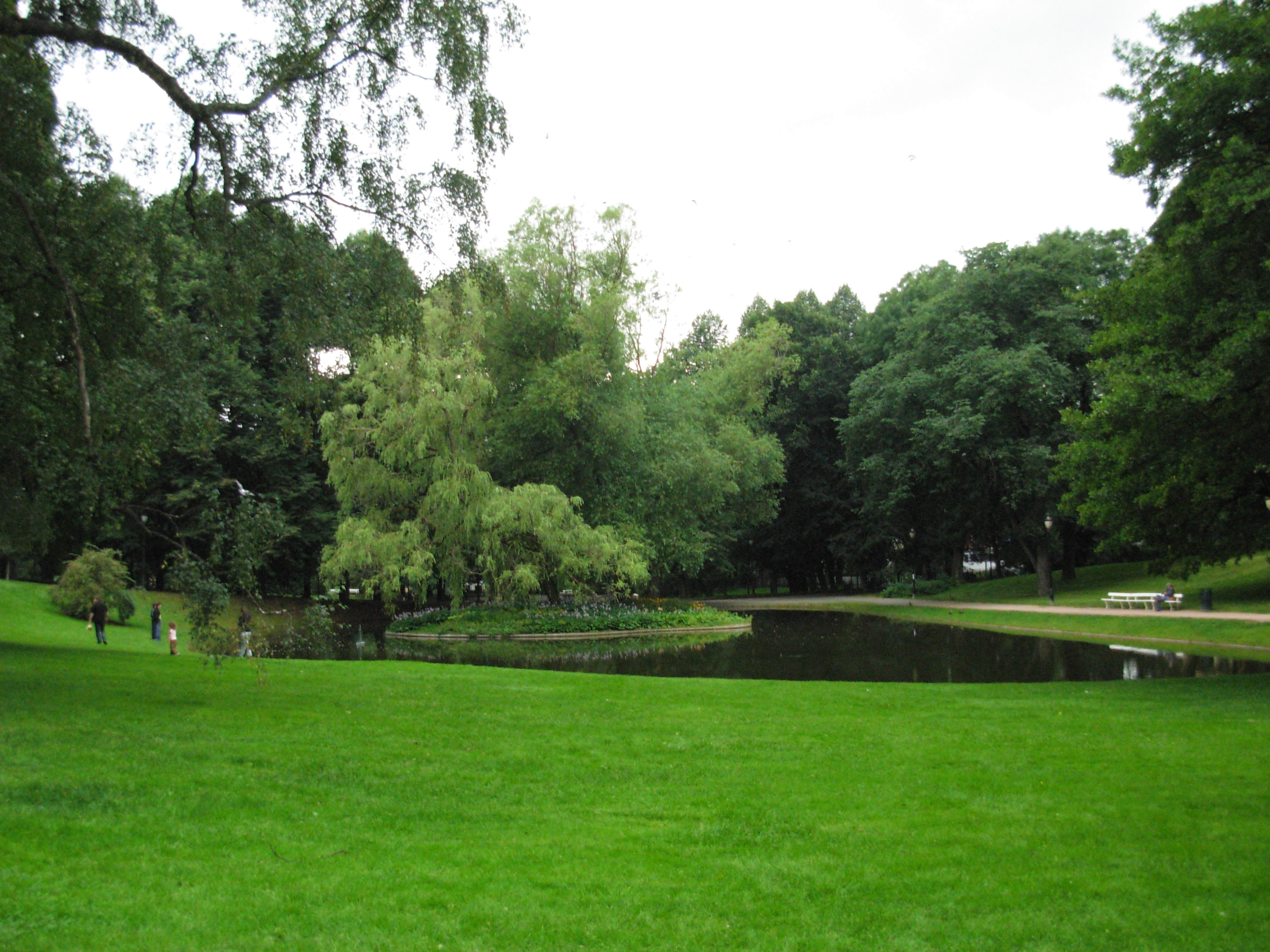
The King's Mirror

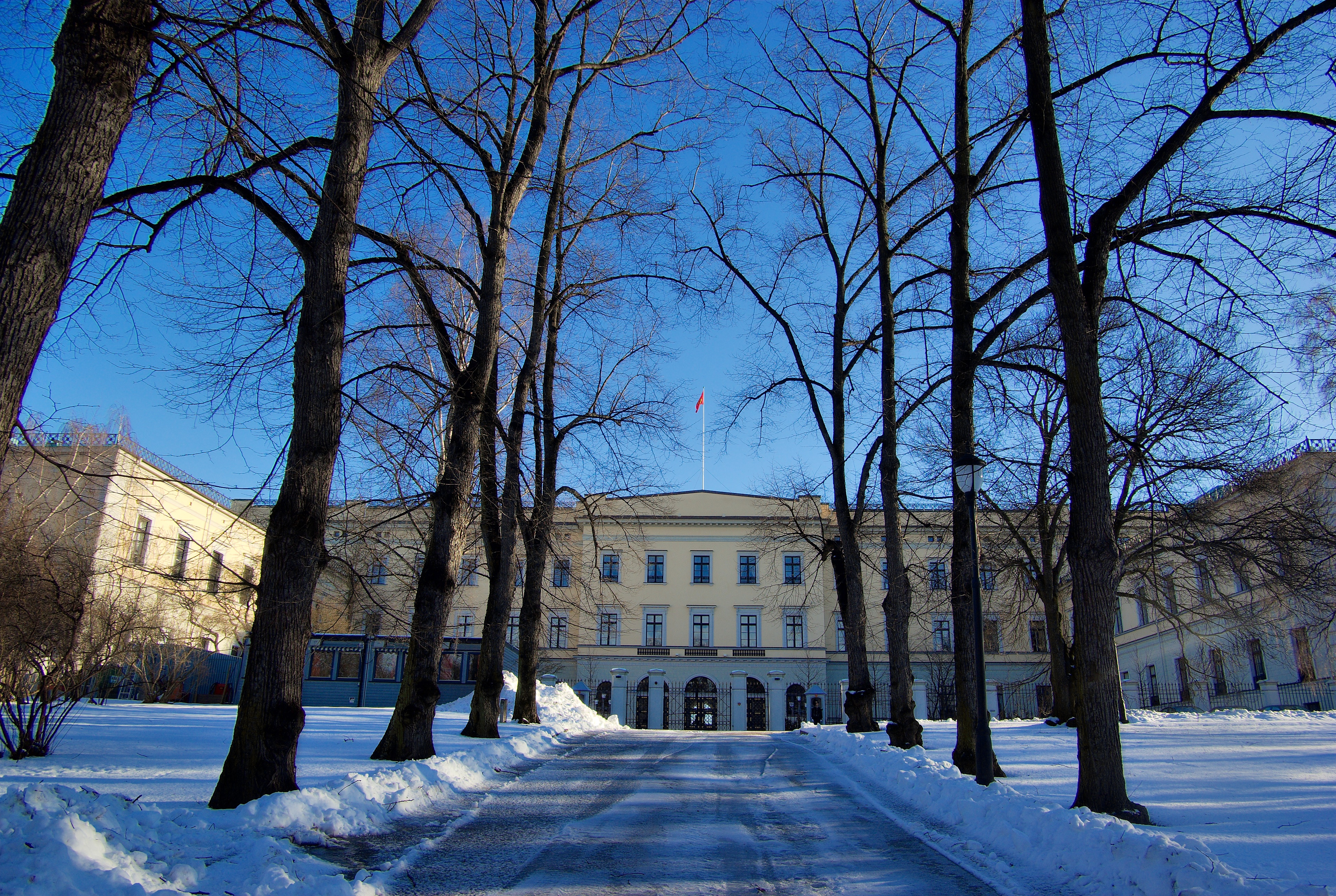
The back of the Royal Palace as seen from the park

Palace Park (Norwegian: Slottsparken) is a public park in the center of Oslo, Norway, surrounding the Royal Palace. It is 22 hectares (54 acres).

== History ==
The park was built during the 1840s and was designed by Hans Ditlev Franciscus Linstow, who was the main architect of the palace. Two thousand trees were planted in 1848, but since then the park has been redeveloped several times, becoming simpler with larger but fewer paths and fewer creeks.

Queen's Park forms a separate part of Palace Park, and dates back to 1751 when it was built as a private rococo garden.

== Statues in Palace Park ==
- A statue of Charles XIV John of Sweden, located at the Palace Square. Sculpted by Brynjulf Bergslien.
- A statue of Queen Maud. Sculpted by Ada Madssen.
- A statue of Crown Princess Märtha. Sculpted by Kirsten Kokkin.
- A statue of Queen Sonja. Sculpted by Kirsten Kokkin.
- A statue of Camilla Collett. Sculpted by Gustav Vigeland.
- A statue of Nils Henrik Abel. Sculpted by Gustav Vigeland.

=== Princess Ingrid Alexandra's Sculpture Park ===
Princess Ingrid Alexandra's Sculpture Park is part of Palace Park. There are sculptures made by Norwegian children, for children, and specially chosen by the princess.
