= Ada Madssen =

Norwegian sculptor

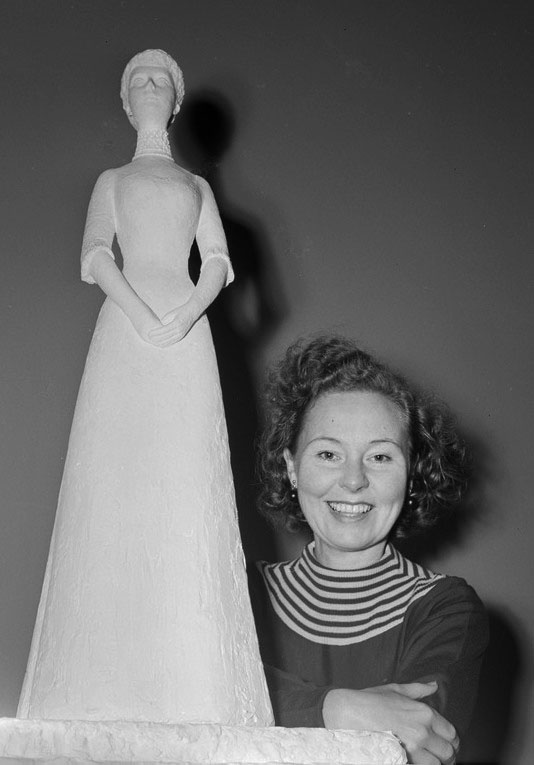
Ada Madssen with the Queen Maud monument, 1956.jpg

Ada Madssen (9 February 1917 – 22 September 2009) was a Norwegian sculptor.

She was born in Kristiania. She studied under Wilhelm Rasmussen and Axel Revold at the Norwegian National Academy of Fine Arts from 1938 to 1940. The National Museum of Art, Architecture and Design owns three of her works, and she is also known for statues of Queen Maud near the Royal Palace, Oslo (erected 1959) and Camilla Collett at Eidsvoll (erected 1977). In 2007 she was decorated as a Knight First Class of the Royal Norwegian Order of St. Olav.
