= Slottsplassen =

Square in Oslo, Norway

Coordinates: 59.91668°N 10.72895°E

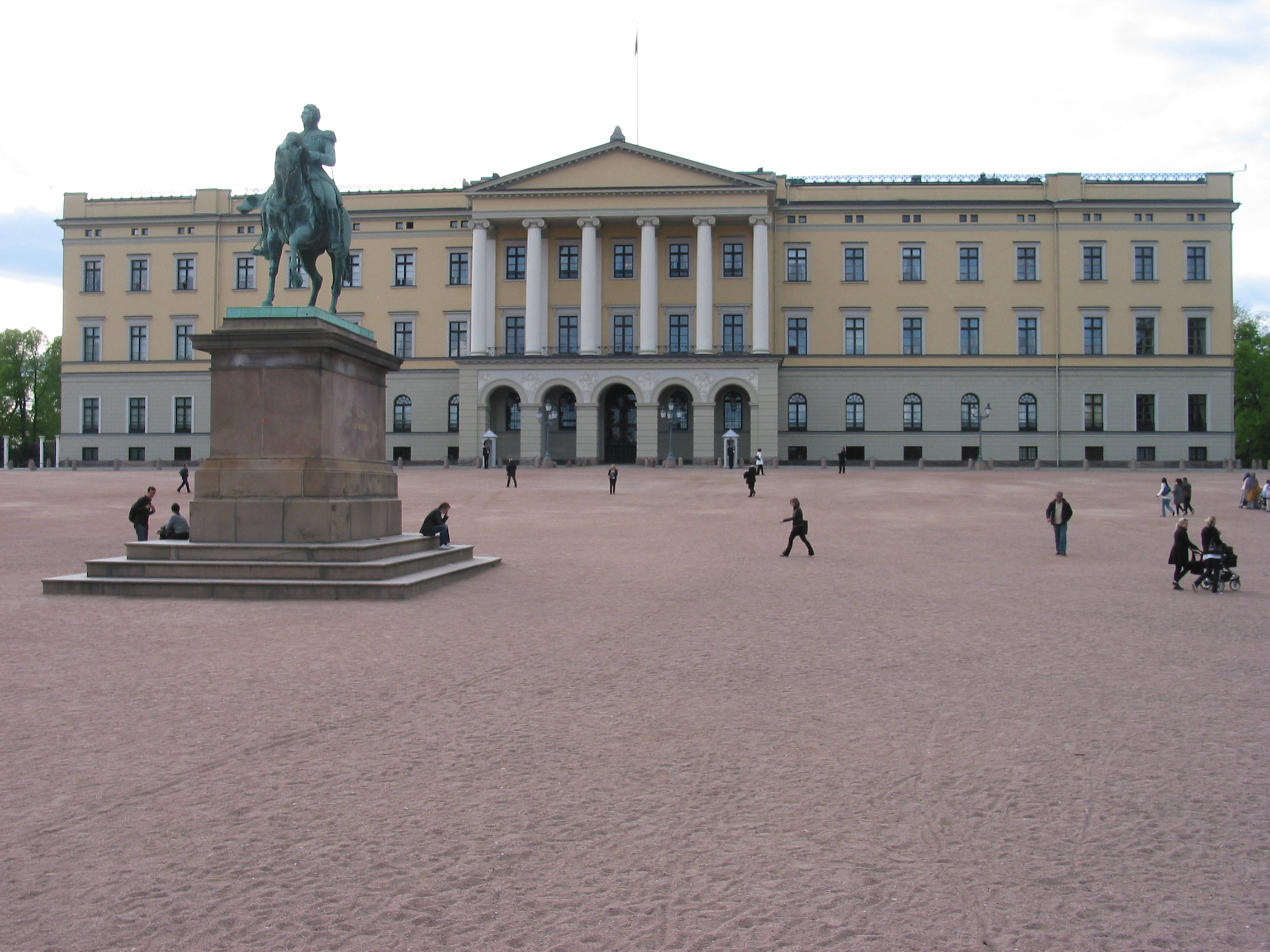
Slottsplassen in front of the Royal Palace.

Slottsplassen ('The Palace Square') is a square in Oslo, Norway.

The square is located in front of the Royal Palace, and was designed by Hans Linstow together with the Palace and the Royal Palace Park. Its most prominent feature is the statue of Charles John of Norway and Sweden, sculpted by Brynjulf Bergslien and erected in 1875.

The street Karl Johans gate starts at the square, turning southeast towards Jernbanetorget via Egertorget.
