= Studenterlunden =

Park in Oslo, Norway

Coordinates: 59°54′53″N 10°44′06″E

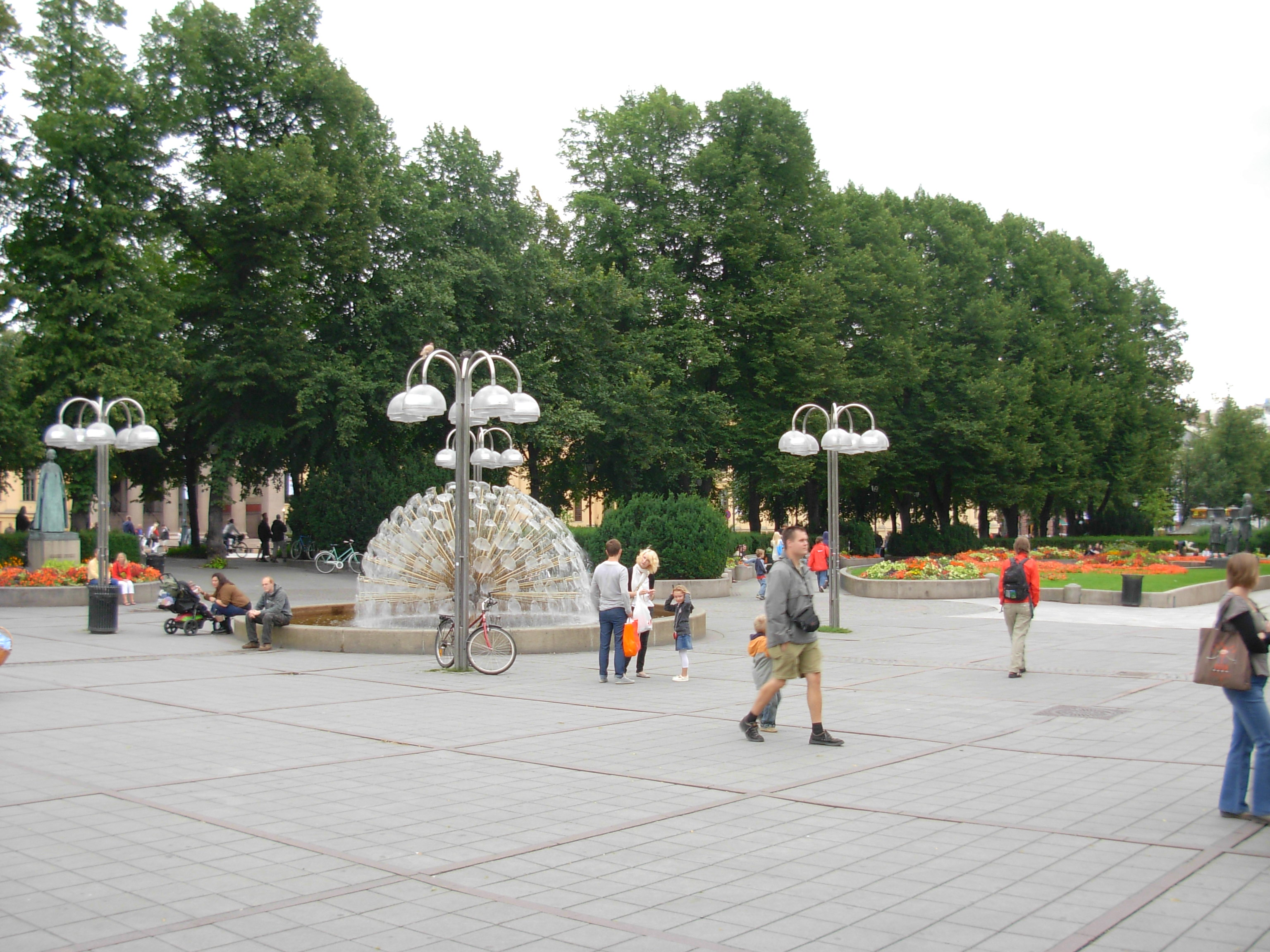
Studenterlunden

Studenterlunden is a park in the city center of Oslo, Norway.

Studenterlunden (English:student's grove) is surrounded by four streets; Karl Johans gate, Stortingsgata, Frederiks gate and Roald Amundsens gate. It is situated west of Eidsvolls plass. Within the park lies the National Theatre. The park also contains one of the entrances to Nationaltheatret Station of the Oslo Metro and Nationaltheatret Station on the Drammen Line.

The park dates to 1837 when the area opened adjacent to the new buildings of the University of Oslo. The municipality took over responsibility in 1888. The park includes a music pavilion, beer garden and a variety of statues of famous Norwegians including Henrik Ibsen, Ludvig Holberg and Bjørnstjerne Bjørnson.
