= Brynjulf Bergslien =

Norwegian sculptor (1830–1898)

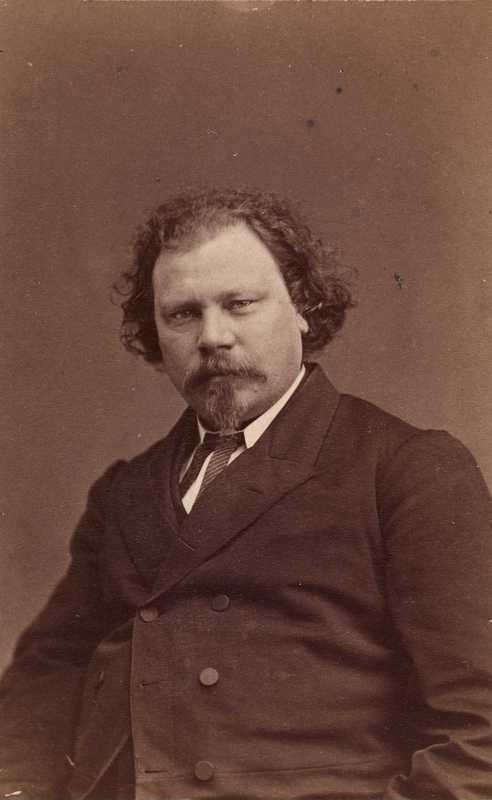
Brynjulf Bergslien

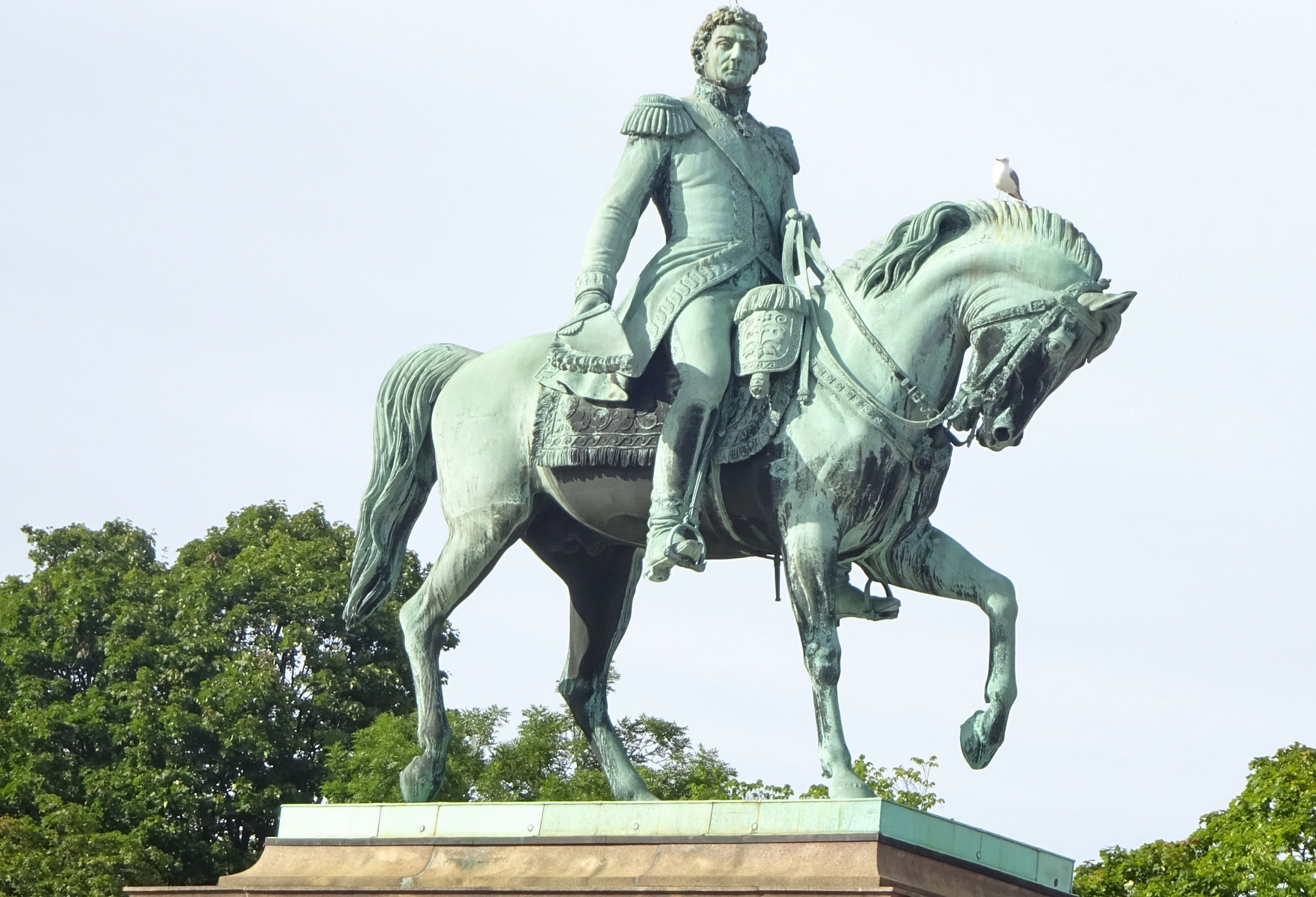
Statue of King Charles XIV John at Slottsplassen

Brynjulf Larsen Bergslien (12 November 1830 – 19 September 1898) was a noted Norwegian sculptor.

== Background ==
Bergslien was born in Voss in Søndre Bergenhus county, Norway. He was a son of Lars Bergeson Bergslien and Kirsten Knutsdotter Gjelle. He was a brother of noted painter and master artist Knud Bergslien. In 1861 he married Johanne Christine Tønnesen (1842–1930).

== Career ==
He studied under Jens Adolf Jerichau and Herman Wilhelm Bissen in Copenhagen between 1853 and 1861. In 1861 he settled in Kristiania (now Oslo) where he ran his own engraving workshop. Bergslien also operated an artist's training studio. Among his students were Sigvald Asbjornsen and Gustav Vigeland.

He sculpted several prominently placed statues in Oslo, including that of King Charles John of Norway and Sweden (1875) at Slottsplassen in front of the Royal Palace. He was also noted for the statue of f Henrik Wergeland (1881) at Eidsvolls plass . Other notable statues include that of Peter Christian Asbjørnsen (1891) at St. Hanshaugen Park.

== Bergslien Park ==
Brynjulf Bergslien and Knud Bergslien were the uncles of painter and sculptor Nils Bergslien. Monuments honoring the three famous Bergslien artists now exist in Bergslien Park located in Voss, Hordaland, Norway.
