= Karl Johans gate =

Street in Oslo

Coordinates: 59°54′47″N 10°44′27″E

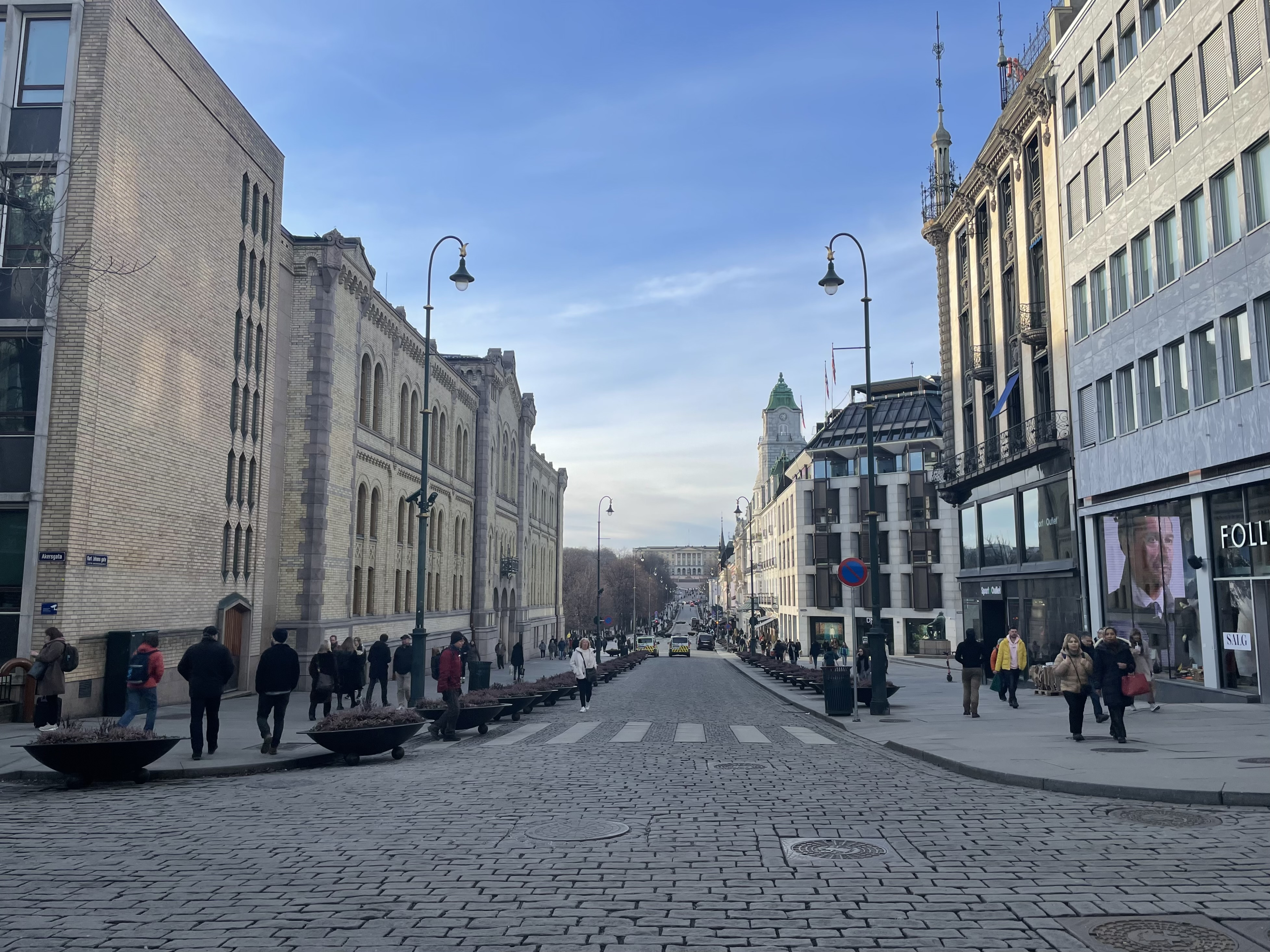
Karl Johans gate, March 2022

Karl Johans gate is the main street of the city of Oslo, Norway. The street was named in honor of King Charles III John, who was also King of Sweden as Charles XIV John.

Karl Johans gate is a composite of several older streets that used to be separate thoroughfares. The eastern section was part of Christian IV's original city near the ramparts surrounding the city. When the ramparts were removed to make way for Oslo Cathedral, three separate sections eventually became Østre Gade.

The wider western section was built during the 1840s as an avenue connecting the newly erected Norwegian Royal Palace at Slottsplassen (palace square) with the rest of the city. In 1852, the street was named Karl Johans gate in honor of the recently deceased king. His equestrian statue, by sculptor Brynjulf Bergslien, was later erected during 1875 in front of the Royal Palace. When the Norwegian parliament building was completed in 1866 at the junction of the two formerly separate streets, the two streets were joined and the whole length was named Karl Johans gate.

The street and palace square are the main celebration venue for Norway's Constitution Day 17 May, royal events and other celebrations.

== Gallery ==
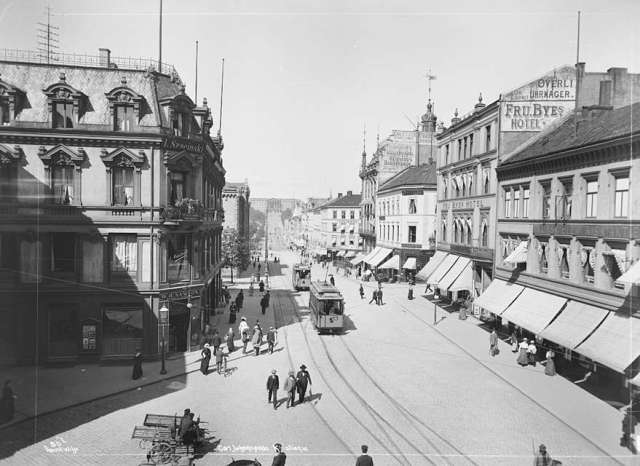
Karl Johans gate in the 1890s

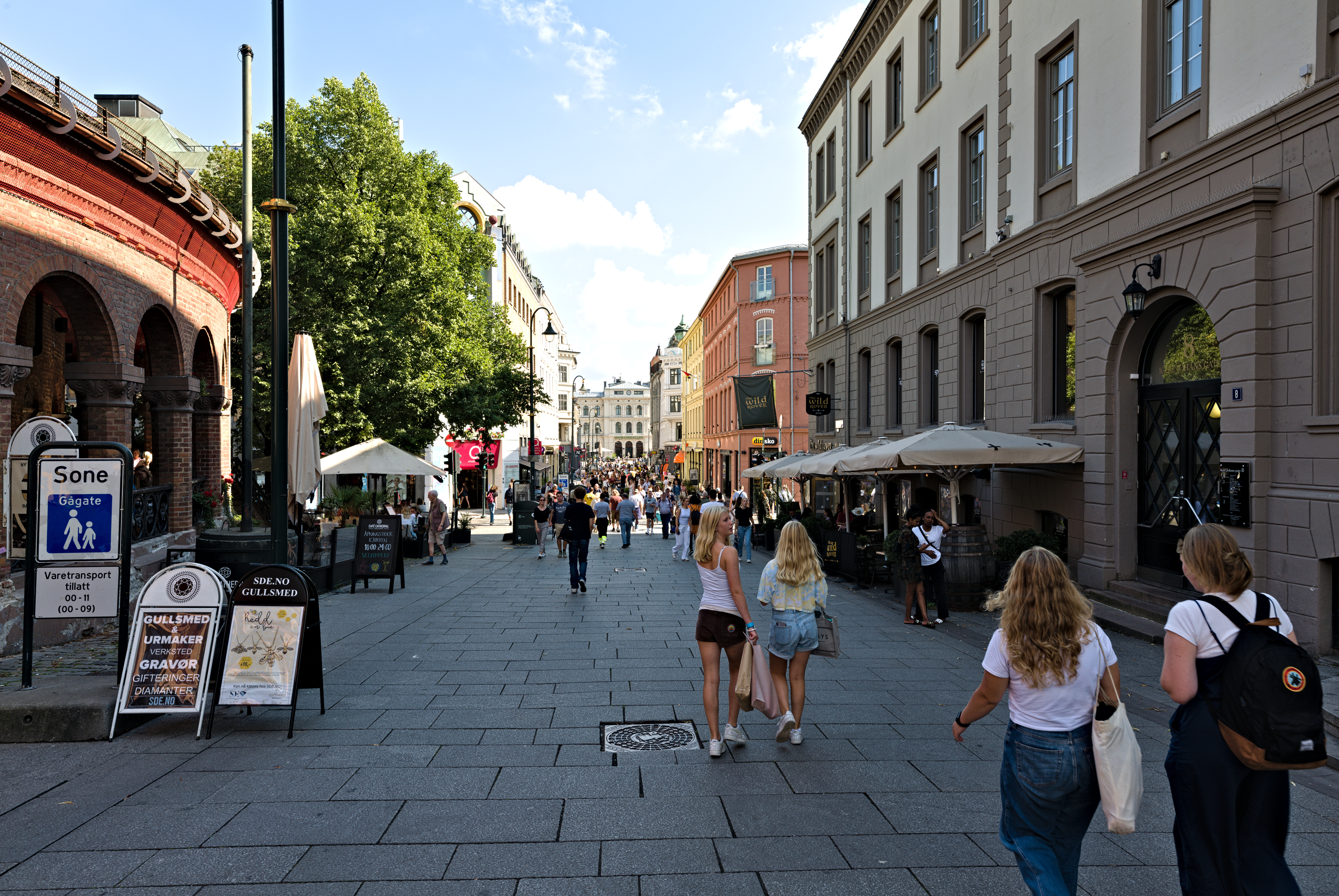
August 2022

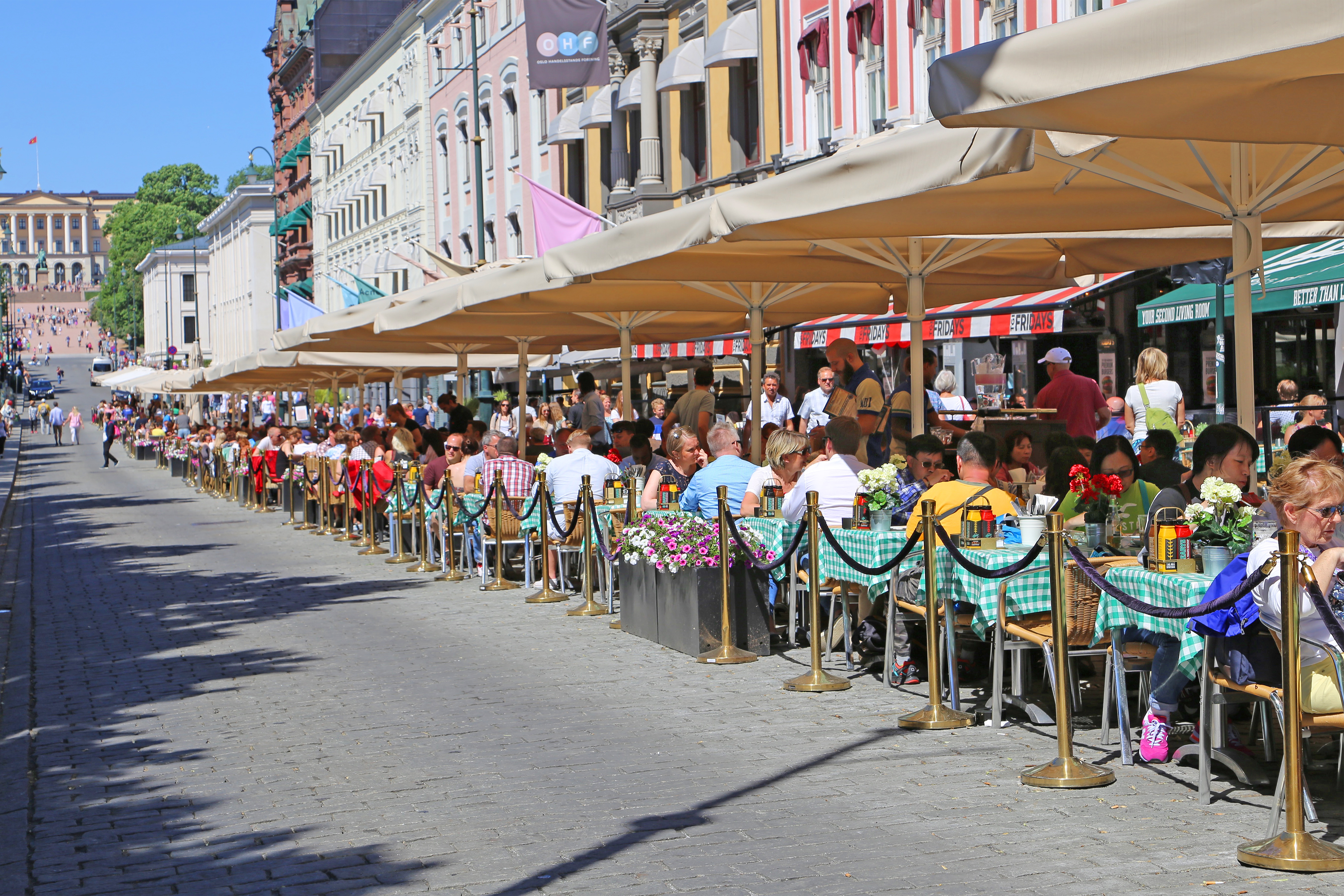
June 2016

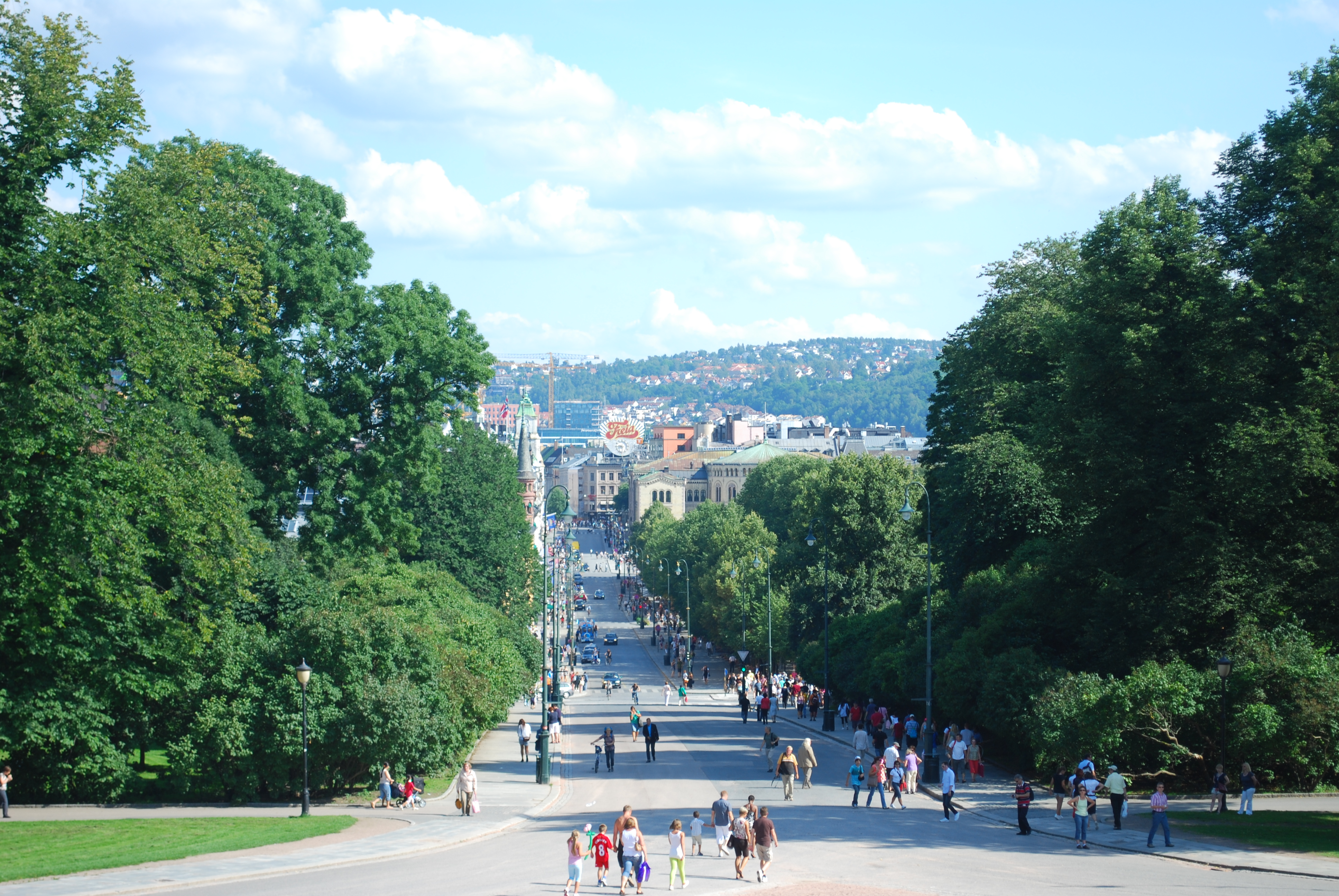
August 2009

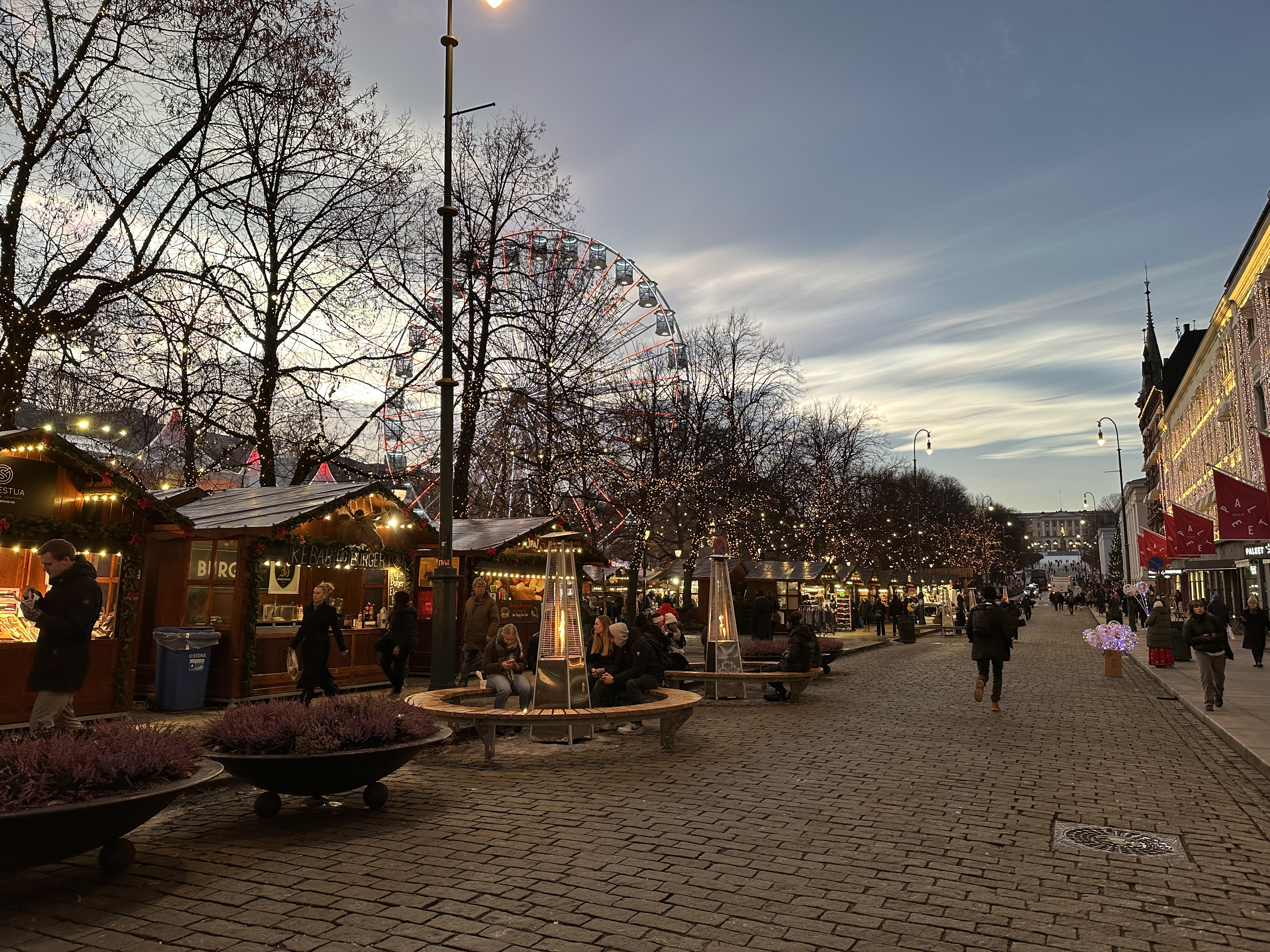
Christmas market, 2023

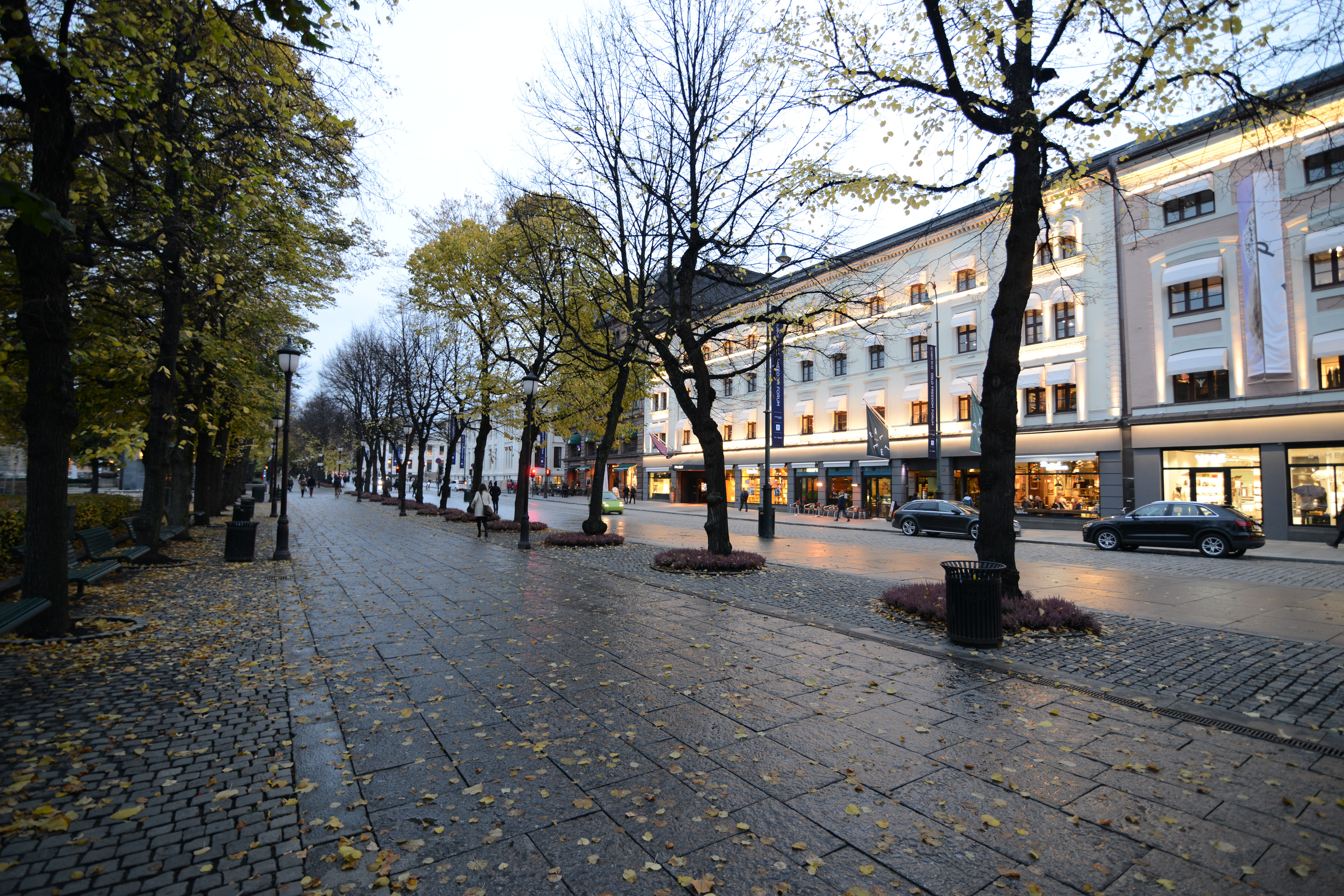
October 2014

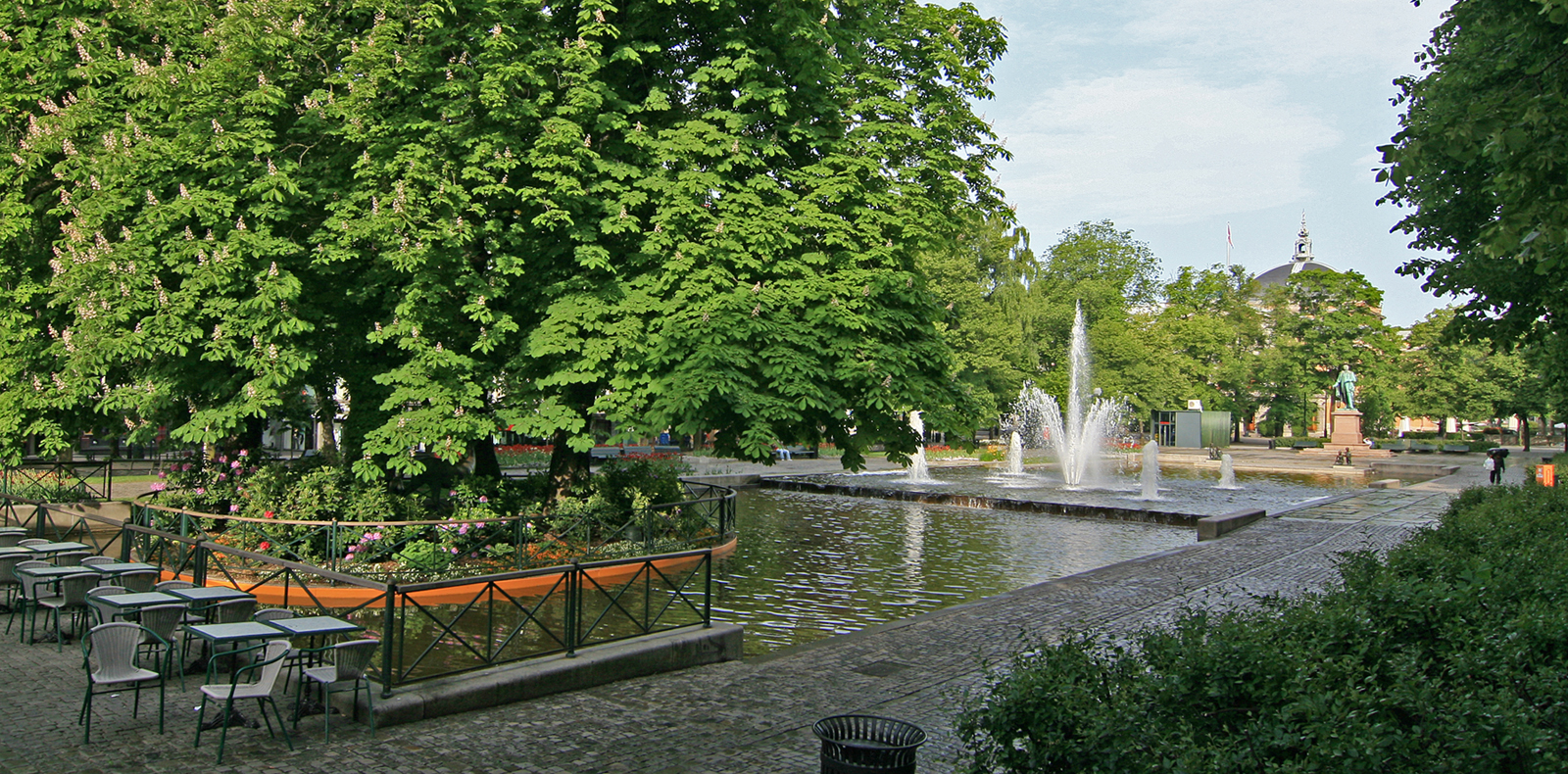
Spikersuppa, May 2008

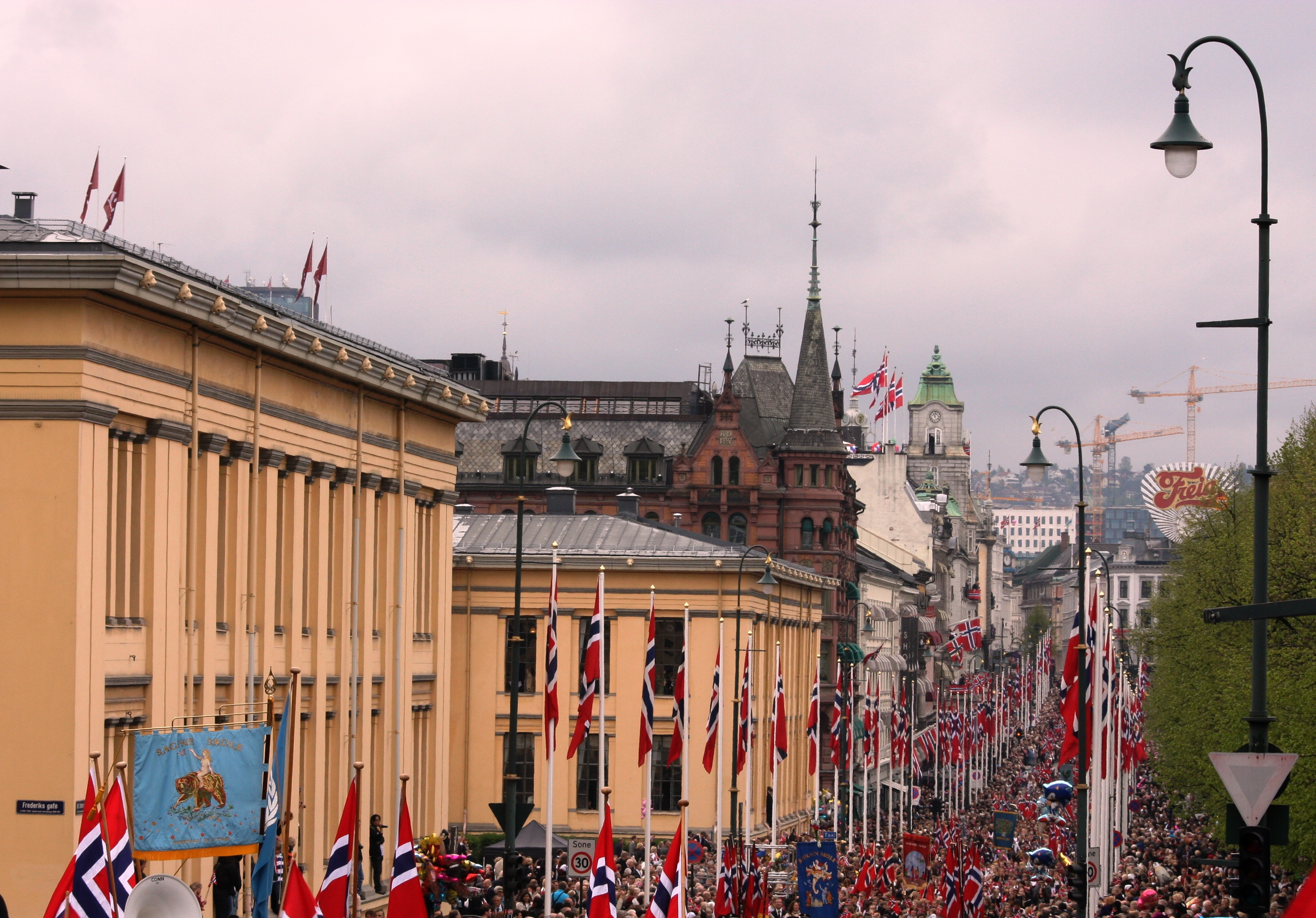
Karl Johans gate on Norwegian Constitution Day, 17 May 2010

== See also ==
- Oslo Astrological Clock
- Sentrum, Oslo
