= Royal Palace, Oslo =

Official residence of the monarch of Norway

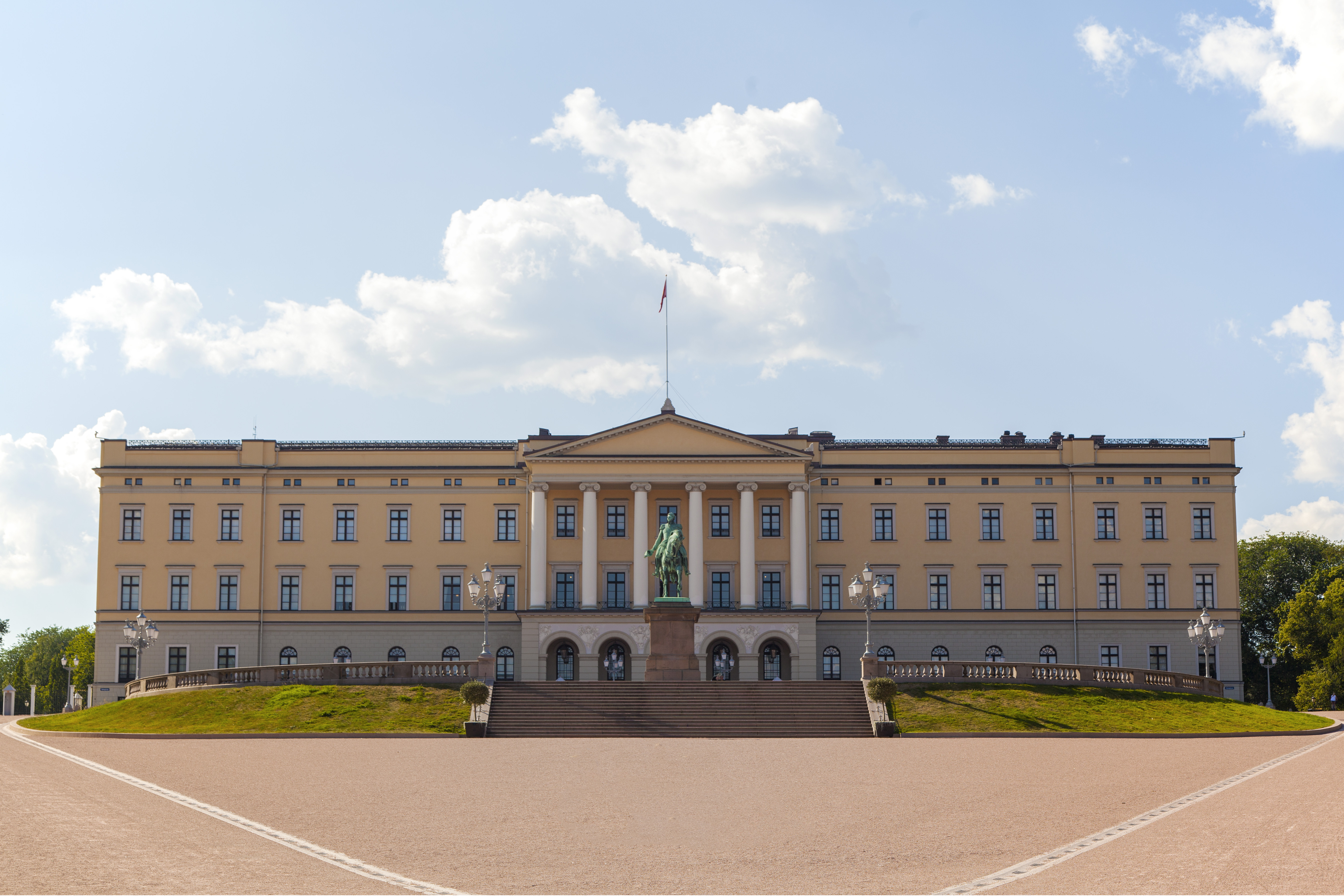
- View of the front facade

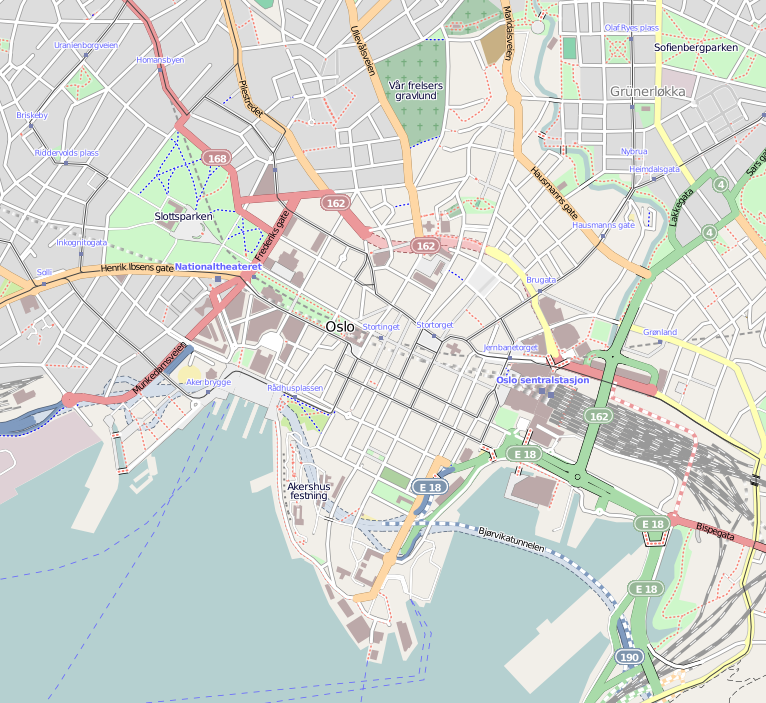
- Location within Central Oslo

General information
- Architectural style: Neoclassicism
- Location: Oslo, Norway
- Coordinates: 59°55′2″N 10°43′39″E
- Current tenants: Haakon VIII (King of Norway)
- Construction started: 1825
- Completed: 26 July 1849
- Client: Charles III John

Design and construction
- Architect: Hans Linstow

Other information
- Number of rooms: 173

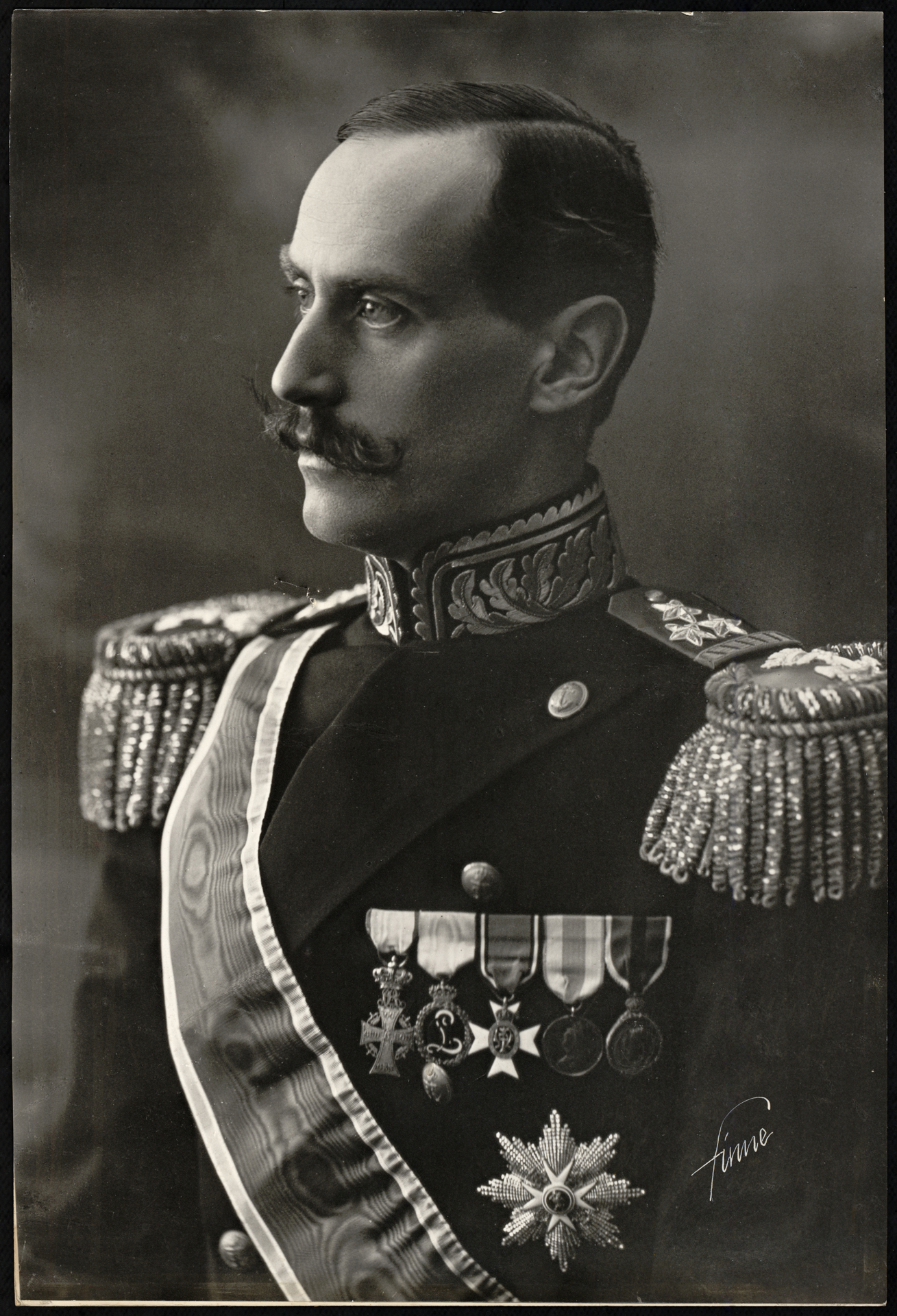
King Haakon VII, the first monarch to permanently reside at the palace

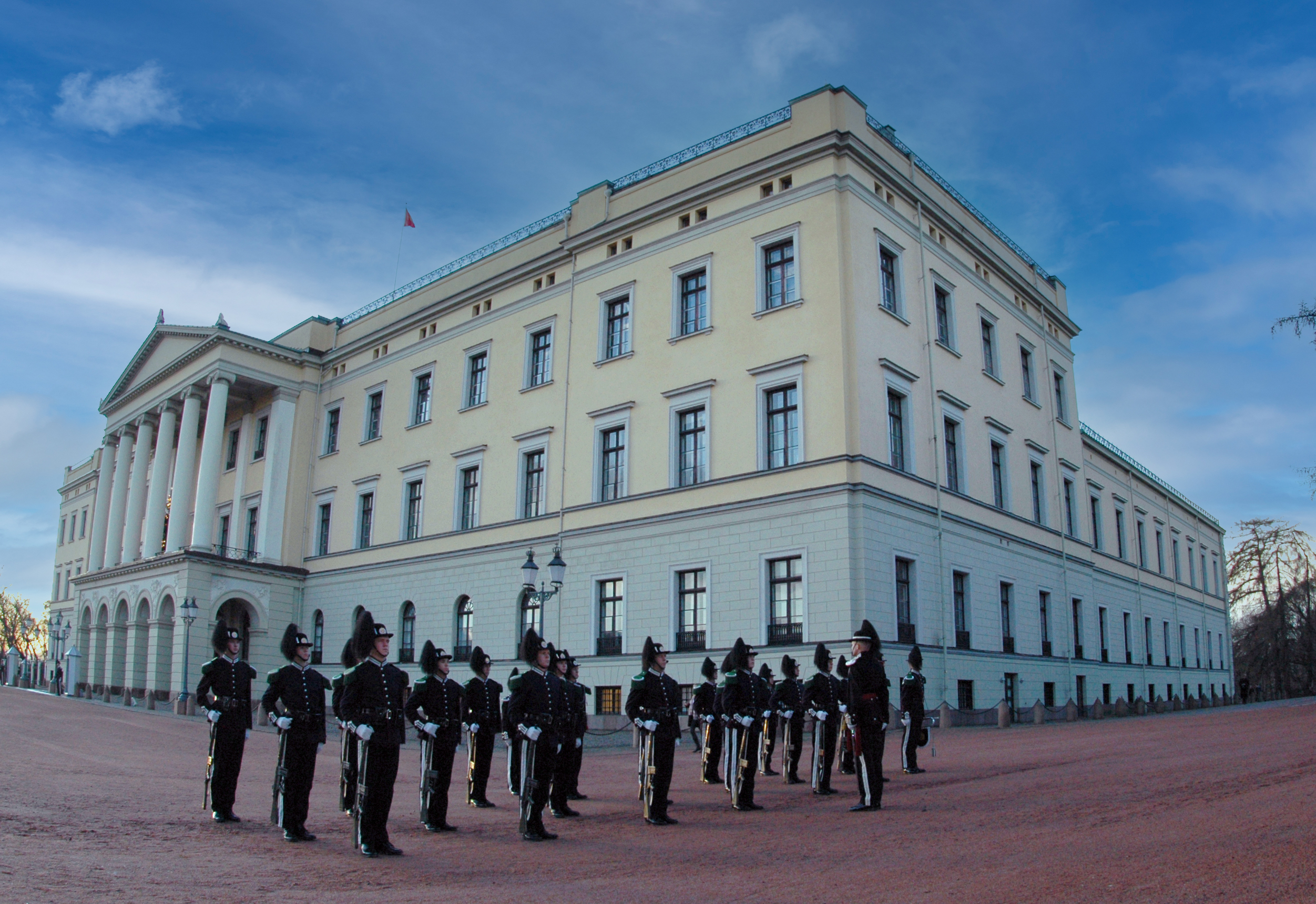
Royal Guardsmen in front of the Royal Palace

The Royal Palace (Norwegian: Slottet, lit. 'the Palace' or Det kongelige slott) in Oslo is the official residence of the Norwegian monarch. It was built in the first half of the 19th century as the Norwegian residence of the French-born Charles XIV John, who reigned as king of Norway and Sweden.

The palace is located at the end of Karl Johans gate in central Oslo and is surrounded by the Palace Park with the Palace Square in the front.

== History ==
Until the completion of the palace, Norwegian royalty resided in Paléet, the magnificent townhouse in Christiania that the wealthy merchant Bernt Anker bequeathed to the State in 1805 to be used as a royal residence. During the last years of the union with Denmark Paléet was used by the viceroys of Norway, and in 1814 by the first king of independent Norway, Christian Frederick. King Charles III John of the House of Bernadotte resided there as crown prince and later as king during his frequent visits to his Norwegian capital.

=== Construction ===
Charles John chose the site for the permanent royal palace on the western side of Christiania in 1821 and commissioned the officer and inexperienced architect, Danish-born Hans Linstow, to design the building. The Parliament approved the stipulated cost of 150 000 speciedaler to be financed by the sale of government bonds. Work on the site started in 1824, and on 1 October 1825 Charles John laid down the foundation stone beneath the altar of the future palace chapel. Linstow originally planned a building of only two storeys with projecting wings on both sides of the main façade.

The costly foundation works caused the budget to be exceeded, and the building stopped in 1827, only to be resumed in 1833. In the meantime, the Storting refused additional grants as a demonstration against the King's unpopular efforts to establish a closer union between his two kingdoms. In 1833, Linstow produced a less costly project without the projecting wings, but with a third storey as compensation. Improved relations with the king made the Storting grant the necessary funds to complete the building. The roof was laid in 1836, and the interiors were finished during the late 1840s.

=== The Royal Palace Chapel ===
The Royal Palace contains its own chapel, consecrated in 1844. The Church of Norway is responsible for the religious services taking place there. It is the scene of many events of the Norwegian royal family like the royal baptisms and confirmations. There are also concerts of church music and chamber music.

=== During the Bernadotte dynasty ===
King Charles John never had the pleasure of residing in his palace before he died in 1844, and its first occupants were his son Oscar I and his queen Josephine. It was soon found that the royal family needed a more spacious residence, and the wings facing the garden were extended. Before the official inauguration in 1849, the central colonnade that had been axed in 1833 was reintroduced, and the provisional steep roof was replaced by a more elegant and more expensive flat roof.

The next Bernadotte kings Charles IV and Oscar II continued to use the royal palace in Christiania, but spent most of their time in Stockholm. King Oscar's wife, Sophia of Nassau, preferred to spend summers in Norway, but mostly stayed at the country manor Skinnarbøl near the Swedish border for the sake of her health. Oscar II was absent from the palace during 1905, the year of the dissolution of the union with Sweden, but his son, then Crown Prince Gustaf, paid two short visits in his vain attempts to save the union.

=== Permanent royal residence ===
The Bernadotte dynasty abdicated their Norwegian throne in 1905 and were succeeded by Prince Carl of Denmark, who took the name of Haakon VII when he accepted his election as king of a completely independent Norway. Haakon became the first monarch to use the palace permanently and the palace was therefore refurbished for two years before he, Queen Maud and Crown Prince Olav could move in. King Haakon would be the first monarch to greet the children's parade on the palace balcony during the Norwegian Constitution Day celebration in Oslo. It was also King Haakon VII who in 1905 introduced the tradition of weekly meetings with the Council of State, a tradition which is still practiced with the meetings always being held in the palace's Council Chamber where the monarch's throne is located.

=== Modernization and public access ===
During the reign and residence of King Olav V from 1957 to 1991, there was little funds for renovation, something the poorly built original structure direly needed. King Olav would therefore mostly reside at Skaugum and the Bygdøy Royal Estate, but relocated to the palace in 1968 when he gave the Skaugum estate as a wedding gift to his son Crown Prince Harald and his bride Crown Princess Sonja. Shortly after his ascension, King Harald V started a comprehensive renovation project of the palace. The renovations and improvements, all made by Statsbygg, included new fire alarm systems, the construction of new bathrooms, kitchens, offices and a general restructuring of the palace. The King was criticized because of the amount of money needed to bring the palace up to a satisfactory state even if much of this went to rectify construction deficits from a century and a half ago. With the renovations completed, the King and Queen relocated from Skaugum to the palace in 2001 as the Skaugum estate was to become the new home of the then Crown Prince Haakon and his family.

The palace, like all royal residence in Norway, is guarded by His Majesty The King's Guard; the Royal Guards. Since public tours began in 2002, the general public has been able to view and appreciate the renovation and splendor that the palace now boasts. The daily changing of the guard has also become a popular tourist attraction in recent years.

== The Palace Park ==
The Palace Park (Norwegian: Slottsparken) is a surrounding public park, one of the largest parks of the capital. It is 22 hectares (54 acres).

== The Queen Sonja Art Stable ==
In 2017, the former palace stables were renovated and converted into a multipurpose art venue which was named Dronning Sonja KunstStall. The building will be used as an art gallery, museum and concert hall and is now open to the public.

== Gallery ==
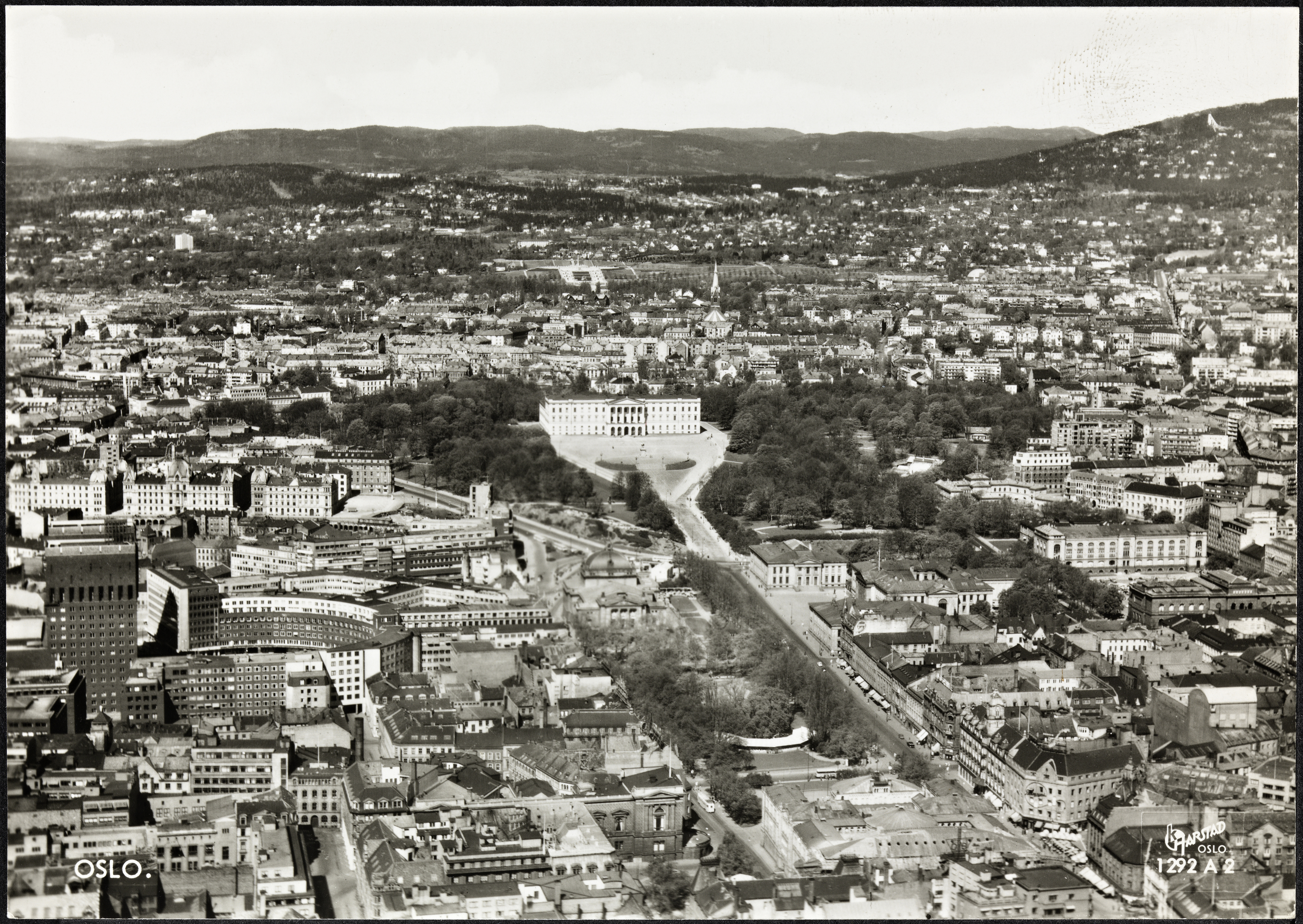
Aerial view of the Royal Palace and the surrounding park

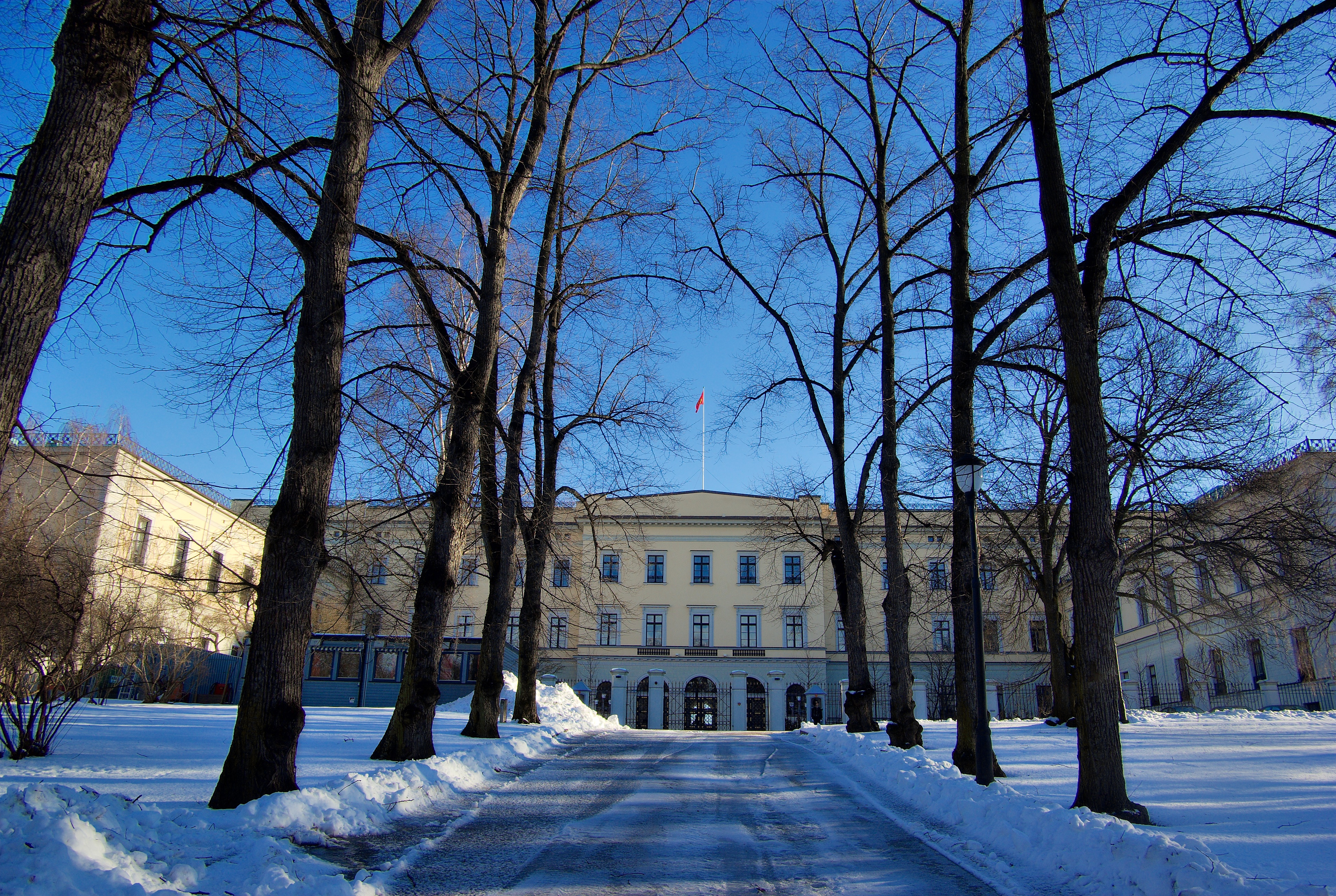
The Royal Palace seen from the rear end

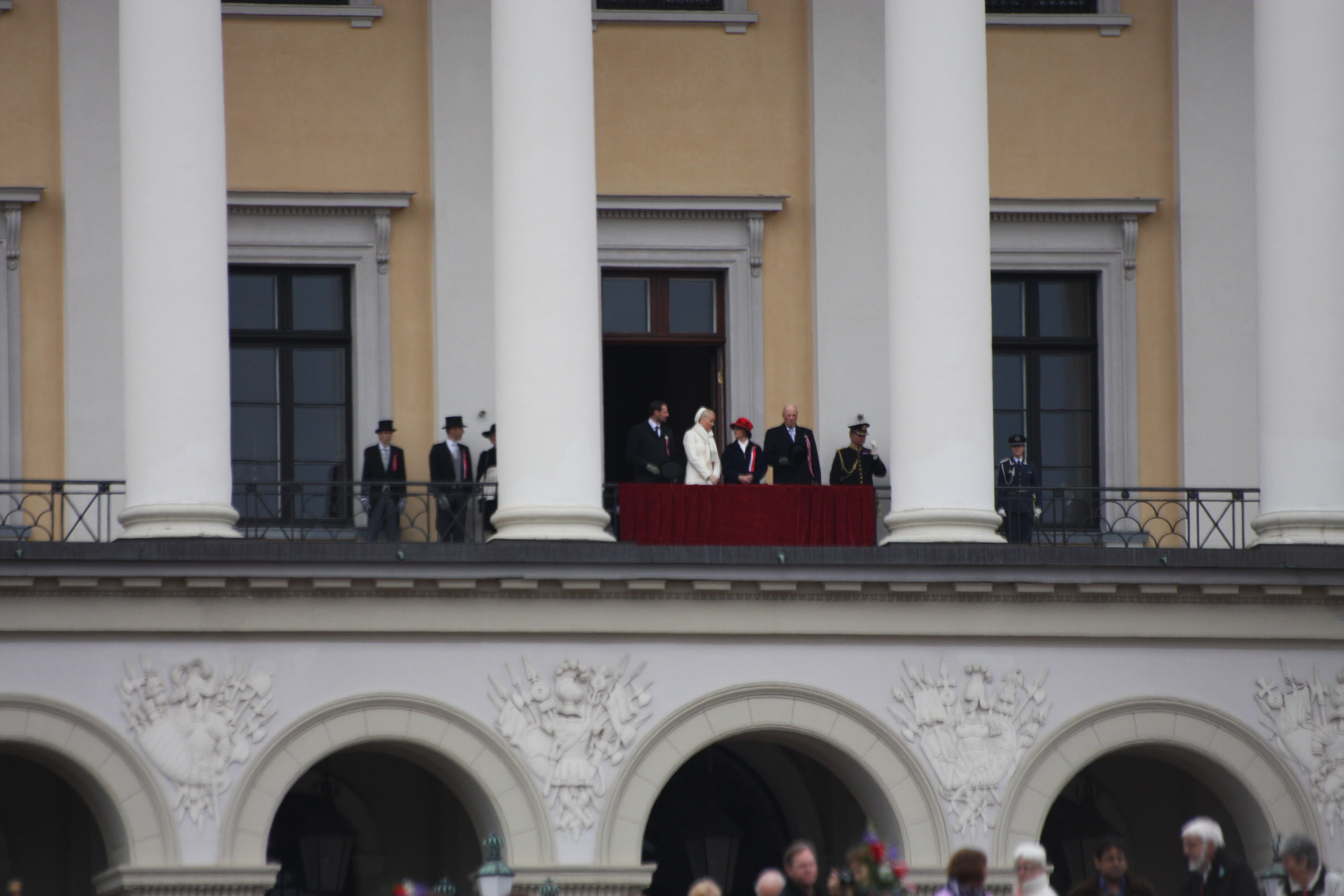
The royal family standing on the palace balcony

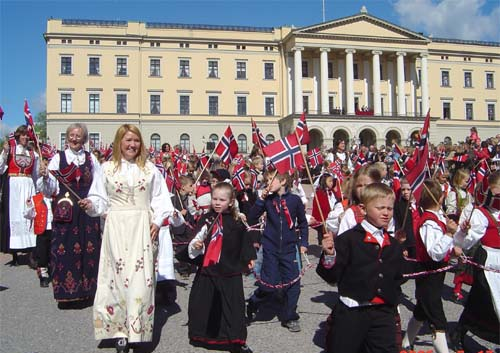
The children's parade passes the Royal Palace during the Norwegian Constitution Day, May 17, 2005

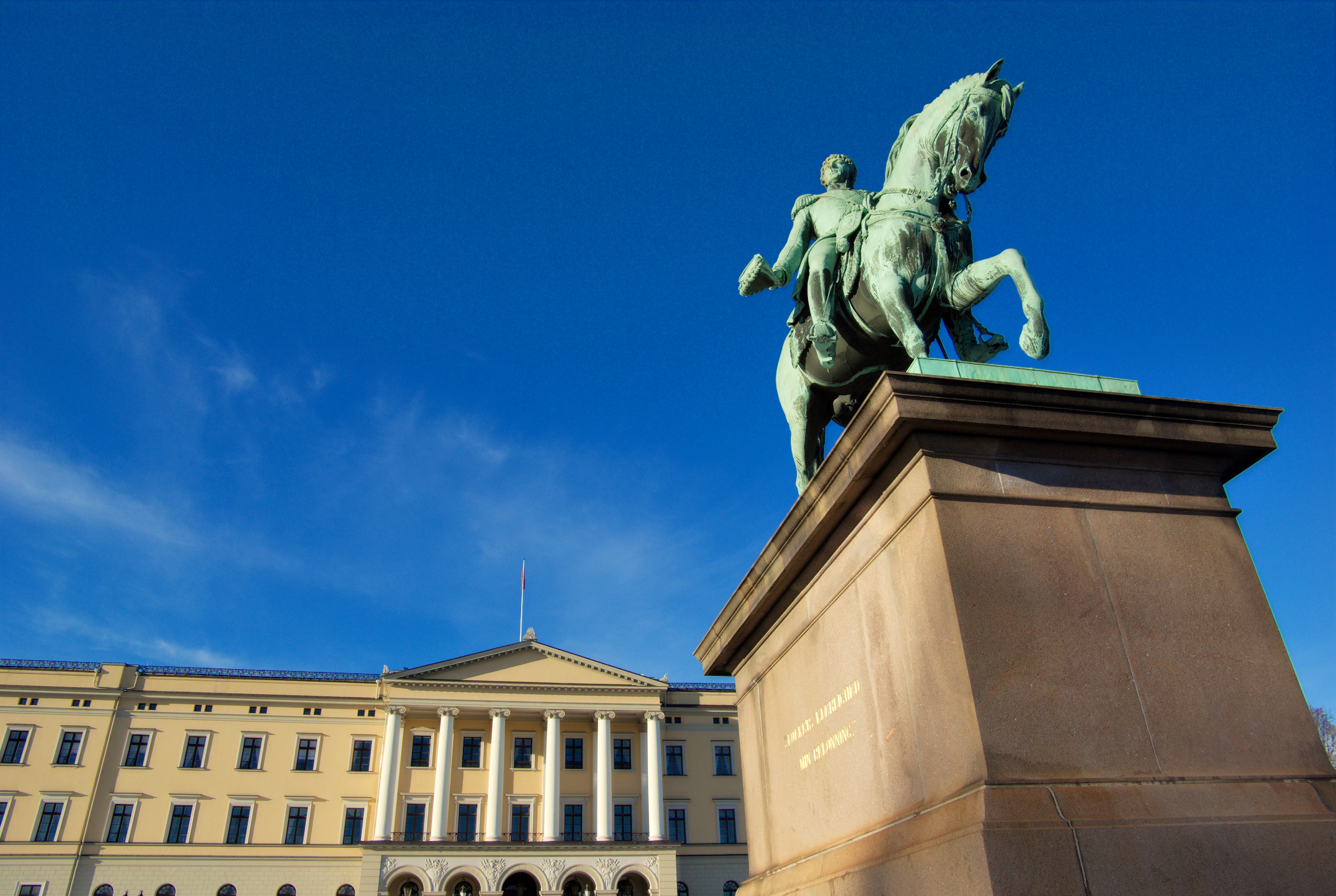
Statue of King Charles John on the Palace square

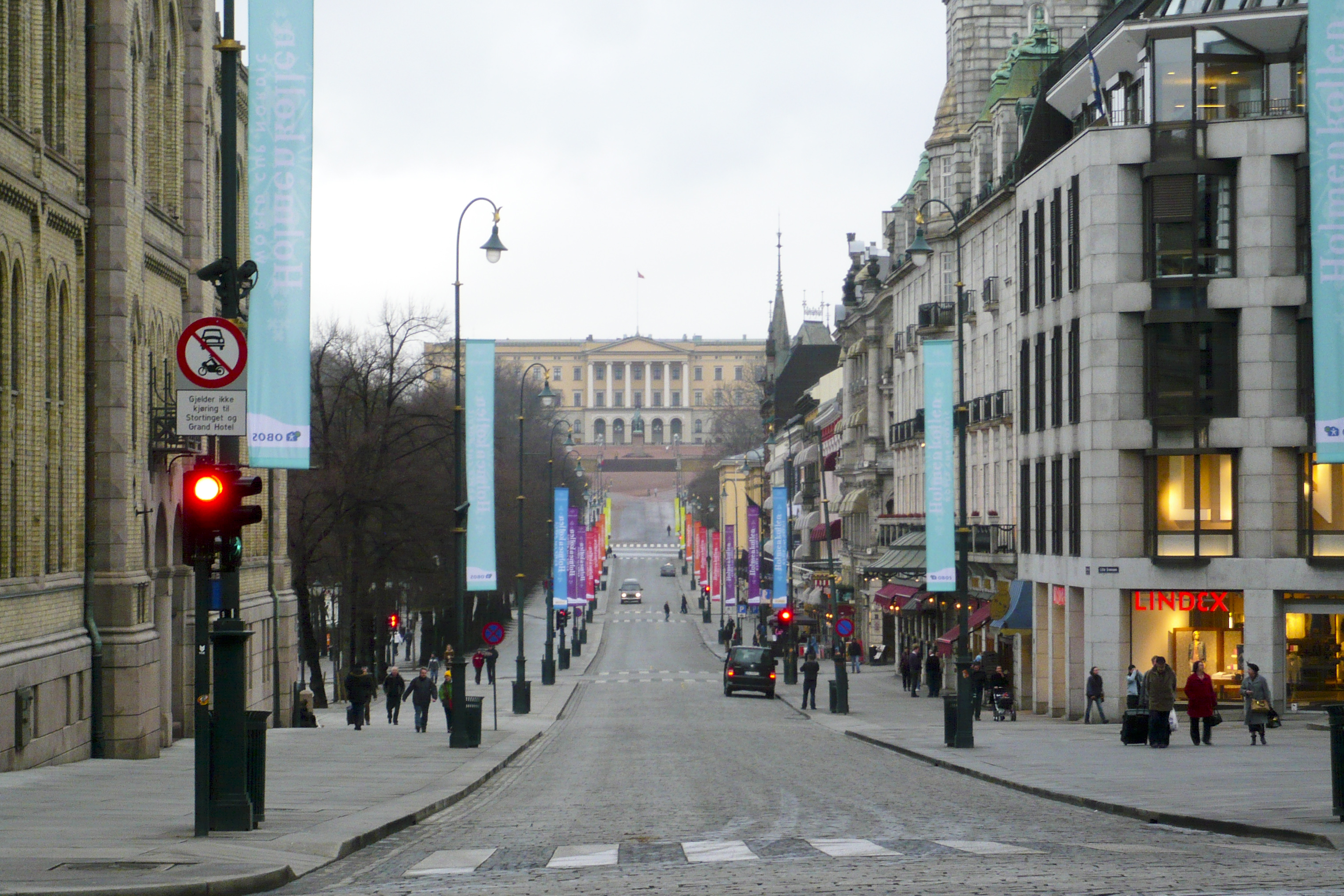
The Royal Palace seen from Karl Johan's street. The walls of the Storting can be seen on the left.

== Bibliography ==
- Kavli, Guthorm (1970). The royal palace in Oslo. Dreyer.
