= List of concerts at The Anthem =

The Anthem is a music venue and auditorium in Washington, D.C. that opened in October 2017. With a capacity of 2,500 to 6,000, the venue is used for concerts, spanning a wide range of musical genres. The following is a list of concerts and music events that have been held at the venue.

== Concerts ==
=== 2017 ===
| Date(s) | Headliner(s) | Supporting act(s) | Event / Tour | Attendance | Revenue | Ref. |
|---|---|---|---|---|---|---|
| October 12 | Foo Fighters | The Struts | Concrete and Gold Tour | 6,000 / 6,000 | $610,525 | |
| October 14 | Kaleo | ZZ Ward; Wilder | Kaleo Express Tour | 3,228 / 3,228 | $136,065 | |
| October 15 | Trombone Shorty & Orleans Avenue | Vintage Trouble | Parking Lot Symphony Tour | 3,501 / 3,501 | $138,597 | |
| October 16 | Phoenix | The Lemon Twigs | Ti Amo Tour | 4,161 / 4,161 | $191,525 | |
| October 17 | LCD Soundsystem | —N/a | American Dream Tour | 12,000 / 12,000 | $718,662 | |
| October 18 | LCD Soundsystem | —N/a | American Dream Tour | 12,000 / 12,000 | $718,662 | |
| October 20 | Queens of the Stone Age | Royal Blood | Villains World Tour | 6,000 / 6,000 | $304,599 | |
| October 21 | Zedd | Grey; Lophile | Echo Tour | 5,657 / 5,657 | $248,037 | |
| October 23 | The War on Drugs | The Building | Fall Tour 2017 | 3,502 / 3,502 | $150,482 | |
| October 25 | Phil Lesh & The Terrapin Family Band | Nicki Bluhm; Robert Randolph & The Family Band; Preservation Hall Jazz Band | Fall Tour 2017 | 2,047 / 2,500 | $175,350 | |
| October 27 | The Head and the Heart | Phosphorescent | Fall Tour 2017 | 3,848 / 3,848 | $186,900 | |
| October 28 | Primus | Clutch | Ambushing the Storm Tour | 3,671 / 3,671 | $194,595 | |
| November 2 | The Shins | Baio | Heartworms Tour | 4,938 / 4,938 | $213,585 | |
| November 4 | GRiZ | Big Wild; Opiuo | Good Will Continue Tour | 6,000 / 6,000 | $217,450 | |
| November 7 | Kurt Vile & Courtney Barnett | Jen Cloher | Lotta Sea Lice Tour | 2,427 / 2,500 | $125,022 | |
| November 8 | Grizzly Bear | Serpentwithfeet | Painted Ruins Tour | 1,446 / 2,500 | $66,066 | |
| November 10 | Lindsey Stirling | Alexander Jean | Warmer in the Winter Tour | 3,160 / 3,160 | $252,740 | |
| November 11 | Tegan and Sara | —N/a | The Con X: Tour Acoustic Show | 2,555 / 2,555 | $140,809 | |
| November 14 | Bob Dylan | Mavis Staples | Never Ending Tour 2017 | 4,245 / 4,245 | $355,690 | |
| November 18 | Erykah Badu | The CrossRhodes; Pinky KillaCom | Badu vs. Everythang World Tour | 4,545 / 4,545 | $382,380 | |
| November 19 | Ozuna | —N/a | Odisea Society Tour | 2,549 / 2,549 | $240,914 | |
| November 24 | Odesza | Sofi Tukker; Louis Futon | A Moment Apart Tour | 10,942 / 11,658 | $648,838 | |
| November 25 | Odesza | Sofi Tukker; Louis Futon | A Moment Apart Tour | 10,942 / 11,658 | $648,838 | |
| November 27 | St. Vincent | —N/a | Fear the Future Tour | 4,014 / 4,014 | $186,812 | |
| November 29 | The Lumineers; J Roddy Walston and the Business; Joywave; Barns Courtney | —N/a | DC101's Office Party | 6,000 / 6,000 | $447,725 | |
| November 30 | Morrissey | —N/a | Low in High School Tour | 4,936 / 4,936 | $280,280 | |
| December 1 | Bon Iver | —N/a | 22, A Million Tour | 3,096 / 3,096 | $186,516 | |
| December 2 | Dark Star Orchestra | —N/a | Celebrating the Grateful Dead Experience | 2,844 / 2,844 | $124,650 | |
| December 5 | The National | This Is the Kit | Sleep Well Beast Tour | 6,000 / 6,000 | $285,716 | |
| December 9 | Fantasia | Demetria McKinney | Christmas After Midnight Tour | 2,262 / 2,500 | $173,329 | |
| December 15 | Lil Uzi Vert | —N/a | A Very Uzi Christmas | — | — | |
| December 16 | O.A.R. | —N/a | stOARies Fall Tour | — | — | |
| December 17 | Pentatonix | —N/a | A Pentatonix Christmas Tour | 3,475 / 3,475 | $311,642 | |
| December 29 | SOJA | Twiddle; Footwerk | Poetry in Motion Album Release Party | 3,742 / 3,742 | $158,320 | |
| December 31 | Thievery Corporation | Gogol Bordello; Trouble Funk | NYE at The Anthem | 3,849 / 3,849 | $309,625 | |

=== 2018 ===
| Date(s) | Headliner(s) | Supporting act(s) | Event / Tour | Attendance | Revenue | Ref. |
|---|---|---|---|---|---|---|
| January 10 | The Killers | Alex Cameron | Wonderful Wonderful World Tour | 6,000 / 6,000 | $465,350 | |
| January 12 | Walk the Moon | Company of Thieves | Press Restart Tour | 5,534 / 5,534 | $203,070 | |
| January 13 | Disco Biscuits | Tauk | Live at The Anthem | 3,216 / 3,216 | $135,450 | |
| February 3 | Greensky Bluegrass | Billy Strings | Winter Tour 2018 | 5,387 / 5,387 | $224,320 | |
| February 12 | Noel Gallagher's High Flying Birds | —N/a | Stranded on the Earth World Tour | 2,179 / 2,500 | $123,590 | |
| February 13 | Børns | Charlotte Cardin; Mikky Ekko | Money Man Tour | 3,962 / 3,962 | $165,035 | |
| February 15 | Umphrey's McGee | The Marcus King Band | It's Not Us Tour | 3,018 / 3,018 | $114,790 | |
| February 24 | Portugal. The Man | Twin Peaks | Woodstock Tour | 5,863 / 5,863 | $277,845 | |
| February 25 | Tyler, the Creator | Vince Staples; Taco | Flower Boy Tour | 5,885 / 5,885 | $269,175 | |
| March 3 | Little Big Town | Kacey Musgraves; Midland | The Breakers Tour | 4,604 / 4,604 | $378,850 | |
| March 10 | Dropkick Murphys | Agnostic Front; Bim Skala Bim | St. Patrick's Day Tour | 6,000 / 6,000 | $210,720 | |
| March 15 | MGMT | Matthew Dear | Little Dark Age Tour | 4,226 / 4,226 | $203,520 | |
| March 18 | Judas Priest | Saxon; Black Star Riders | Firepower World Tour | 6,000 / 6,000 | $331,220 | |
| March 23 | Fall Out Boy; G-Eazy; Bebe Rexha; Cam; Lizzo | —N/a | Stay Amped: A Concert to End Gun Violence | 2,498 / 2,500 | $118,000 | |
| March 24 | Glen Hansard | —N/a | Between Two Shores Tour | 2,588 / 2,588 | $123,070 | |
| April 6 | Third Eye Blind; Bush; Lovelytheband | —N/a | Blossom Bash | — | — | |
| April 7 | Monica; BJ the Chicago Kid; The Chuck Brown Band | —N/a | All Black Extravaganza | — | — | |
| April 8 | Lorde | Run the Jewels; Mitski | Melodrama World Tour | 6,000 / 6,000 | $624,700 | |
| April 20 | Black Star; Dead Prez | Mad Squablz; Jay Berd; DJ Bee | Live at The Anthem | — | — | |
| April 21 | The Decemberists | Tennis | Your Girl / Your Ghost World Tour | 5,040 / 5,040 | $220,290 | |
| April 26 | Beck | Kimbra | Colors Tour | 9,707 / 9,707 | $550,305 | |
| April 27 | Beck | Torres | Colors Tour | 9,707 / 9,707 | $550,305 | |
| April 28 | Old Crow Medicine Show | —N/a | Volunteer Tour | 2,519 / 2,519 | $138,635 | |
| April 30 | Modest Mouse | Mass Gothic | Strangers to Ourselves Tour | 4,623 / 4,623 | $221,415 | |
| May 1 | Haim | Lizzo | Sister Sister Sister Tour | 6,000 / 6,000 | $275,880 | |
| May 3 | Alice in Chains | Walking Papers | Summer Tour 2018 | 5,100 / 5,100 | $266,450 | |
| May 4 | Lord Huron | Midnight Sister | Vide Noir Tour | 6,000 / 6,000 | $228,260 | |
| May 7 | Kygo | Harry Hudson | Kids in Love Tour | 12,000 / 12,000 | $678,120 | |
| May 8 | Kygo | Harry Hudson | Kids in Love Tour | 12,000 / 12,000 | $678,120 | |
| May 12 | David Byrne | Benjamin Clementine | American Utopia Tour | 3,119 / 3,119 | $322,275 | |
| May 16 | Nathaniel Rateliff & the Night Sweats | Robert Finley | Tearing at the Seams Tour | 6,000 / 6,000 | $225,900 | |
| May 18 | Fleet Foxes | Amen Dunes | Crack-Up Tour | 6,000 / 6,000 | $195,630 | |
| May 19 | Brandi Carlile | Darlingside | By The Way, I Forgive You Tour | 5,928 / 5,928 | $329,151 | |
| May 20 | Brandi Carlile | Darlingside | By The Way, I Forgive You Tour | 5,928 / 5,928 | $329,151 | |
| May 27 | Willie Nelson & Family | Sturgill Simpson; Chris Jacobs | Memorial Day Weekend | 2,881 / 2,881 | $310,335 | |
| May 29 | Jack White | Lillie Mae | Boarding House Reach Tour | 12,000 / 12,000 | $683,242 | |
| May 30 | Jack White | Radkey | Boarding House Reach Tour | 12,000 / 12,000 | $683,242 | |
| June 9 | Belle and Sebastian | Men I Trust | How to Solve Our Human Problems Tour | 1,369 / 1,639 | $86,165 | |
| June 12 | Vance Joy | —N/a | Nation of Two World Tour | — | — | |
| June 20 | Ray LaMontagne | Neko Case | Part of the Light Tour | 2,430 / 2,500 | $174,748 | |
| July 20 | Janelle Monáe | St. Beauty | Dirty Computer Tour | — | — | |
| July 21 | Greta Van Fleet | Cloves | 2018 World Tour | — | — | |
| July 24 | Courtney Barnett | Julien Baker; Vagabon | Tell Me How You Really Feel Tour | — | — | |
| July 25 | Echo and the Bunny Men; Violent Femmes | —N/a | We Can Do Anything Tour | — | — | |
| July 26 | Sylvan Esso | Moses Sumney | What Now Tour | — | — | |
| July 27 | Silvestre Dangond | —N/a | Caliente Tour | 1,049 / 1,237 | $68,458 | |
| July 28 | Arctic Monkeys | Mini Mansions | Tranquility Base Hotel & Casino Tour | 12,000 / 12,000 | $656,030 | |
| July 29 | Arctic Monkeys | Mini Mansions | Tranquility Base Hotel & Casino Tour | 12,000 / 12,000 | $656,030 | |
| August 2 | Father John Misty | Bully | God's Favorite Customer Tour | — | — | |
| August 17 | Needtobreathe | Johnnyswim; Billy Raffoul | Forever On Your Side Tour | 3,674 / 6,000 | $179,070 | |
| August 25 | Beach House | Papercuts | 7 Tour | — | — | |
| August 28 | New Order | —N/a | 2018 Tour | — | — | |
| September 4 | Miguel | Dvsn; Nonchalant Savant | The Ascension Tour | — | — | |
| September 5 | Mac DeMarco | —N/a | This Old Dog Tour | — | — | |
| September 6 | Punch Brothers | Madison Cunningham | Big Time Summer Tour | — | — | |
| September 10 | First Aid Kit | Julia Jacklin | The Rebel Heart Tour | 2,102 / 6,000 | $90,920 | |
| September 18 | Alison Krauss | —N/a | Windy City Tour | — | — | |
| September 23 | Carlos Vives | —N/a | Vives Tour USA 2018 | — | — | |
| September 28 | Future Islands | Ed Schrader's Music Beat | The Far Field Tour | — | — | |
| September 30 | St. Paul and The Broken Bones | Mattiel | 2018 Tour | — | — | |
| October 3 | Leon Bridges | Khruangbin | Good Thing Tour | — | — | |
| October 4 | Troye Sivan | Kim Petras; Leland | The Bloom Tour | — | — | |
| October 5 | Florence and the Machine | Beth Ditto | High as Hope Tour | 11,412 / 12,000 | $1,211,614 | |
| October 6 | Florence and the Machine | Beth Ditto | High as Hope Tour | 11,412 / 12,000 | $1,211,614 | |
| October 9 | Nine Inch Nails | The Jesus and Mary Chain; Kite Base | Cold and Black and Infinite Tour | 11,290 / 12,000 | $1,147,225 | |
| October 10 | Nine Inch Nails | The Jesus and Mary Chain; Kite Base | Cold and Black and Infinite Tour | 11,290 / 12,000 | $1,147,225 | |
| October 11 | Ben Howard | Wye Oak | Noonday Dream Tour | — | — | |
| October 13 | Goo Goo Dolls | —N/a | Dizzy Up the Girl Tour | — | — | |
| October 14 | NF | —N/a | Perception Tour | — | — | |
| October 17 | Death Cab for Cutie | Charly Bliss | 2018 Tour | — | — | |
| October 18 | Chvrches | Lo Moon | Love Is Dead Tour | — | — | |
| October 20 | Joe Russo's Almost Dead | —N/a | 2018 Fall Tour | — | — | |
| October 25 | Nick Cave and the Bad Seeds | Cigarettes After Sex | North America Tour | — | — | |
| November 1 | Wu-Tang Clan | —N/a | Live at The Anthem | — | — | |
| November 6 | Lil Dicky | Mustard; Oliver Tree | Life Lessons with Lil Dicky | — | — | |
| November 7 | Tenacious D | Wynchester | 2018 Tour | — | — | |
| November 9 | Lake Street Dive | Jalen n' Gonda | Free Yourself Up Tour | — | — | |
| November 16 | Young the Giant | Lights | 2018 Tour | 4,238 / 6,000 | $177,260 | |
| November 21 | Tash Sultana | Ocean Alley | Flow State World Tour | 2,761 / 6,000 | $133,265 | |
| November 24 | The Front Bottoms; Manchester Orchestra | Brother Bird | 2018 Tour | — | — | |
| November 30 | Brian Setzer Orchestra | Lara Hope & the Ark-Tones | 15th Anniversary Christmas Rocks! Tour | 2,183 / 6,000 | $184,140 | |
| December 1 | Dark Star Orchestra | —N/a | Winter Tour | 2,808 / 6,000 | $121,500 | |
| December 2 | Pentatonix | —N/a | Christmas Is Here Tour | 6,118 / 12,000 | $624,389 | |
| December 3 | Pentatonix | —N/a | Christmas Is Here Tour | 6,118 / 12,000 | $624,389 | |
| December 4 | Bastille; Andrew McMahon in the Wilderness; Glorious Sons; Meg Myers | —N/a | DC101's Office Party | 2,984 / 6,000 | $178,960 | |
| December 14 | Lindsey Stirling | —N/a | The Wanderland Tour | 3,095 / 6,000 | $233,145 | |
| December 15 | O.A.R. | Maggie Rose | Just Like Paradise Tour | 6,002 / 6,002 | $285,720 | |
| December 31 | Trombone Shorty & Orleans Avenue | George Clinton & Parliament-Funkadelic; Trouble Funk | New Year's Eve at The Anthem | 3,995 / 6,000 | $325,525 | |

=== 2019 ===
| Date(s) | Headliner(s) | Supporting act(s) | Event / Tour | Attendance | Revenue | Ref. |
|---|---|---|---|---|---|---|
| January 11 | The Revivalists | American Authors | Take Good Care Tour | 6,000 / 6,000 | $259,440 | |
| January 20 | ASAP Rocky | —N/a | Injured Generation Tour | 5,357 / 6,000 | $279,350 | |
| January 24 | Kacey Musgraves | Natalie Prass | Oh, What a World Tour | 3,138 / 3,138 | $199,970 | |
| January 26 | Disco Biscuits | —N/a | Live in Washington D.C. | 2,294 / 6,000 | $98,720 | |
| February 1 | Greensky Bluegrass | Billy Strings | All for Money Tour | | | |
| February 2 | Greensky Bluegrass | Billy Strings | All for Money Tour | | | |
| February 8 | Drive-By Truckers; Lucinda Williams | Erika Wennerstrom | Live on Tour | | | |
| February 9 | Old Dominion | Jordan Davis; Morgan Evans | Make It Sweet Tour | | | |
| February 14 | Beirut | Helado Negro | This Is How You Smile Tour | | | |
| February 15 | Interpol | —N/a | Marauder Tour | | | |
| February 21 | James Blake | Khushi | Assume Form Tour | | | |
| February 22 | Dillon Francis; Alison Wonderland | Diablo | Lost My Mind Tour | | | |
| February 23 | Brothers Osborne | Ruston Kelly | 2019 Tour | | | |
| March 8 | James Bay | Noah Kahan | Electric Light Tour | | | |
| March 9 | Robyn | —N/a | Honey Tour | 6,000 / 6,000 | $340,420 | |
| March 16 | Erykah Badu | Pinky KillaCorn | 2019 Tour | | | |
| March 21 | Meek Mill | Lil Durk; Kash Doll | The Motivation Tour | | | |
| March 23 | Tamia | Isaac Carree | Passion Like Fire Tour | | | |
| March 28 | Jawbreaker | War on Women; Pohgoh | Jawbreaker Live on Tour | | | |
| March 30 | Gary Clark Jr. | —N/a | 2019 Tour | | | |
| April 5 | Meghan Trainor; MAX; Jake Miller | —N/a | iHeartRadio's Blossom Bash | | | |
| April 6 | Ghosts of the Forest | —N/a | Ghosts of the Forest Tour | | | |
| April 18 | Kenny Chesney | David Lee Murphy; Caroline Jones | Songs for the Saints Tour | 12,068 / 12,068 | $1,736,702 | |
| April 19 | Kenny Chesney | David Lee Murphy; Caroline Jones | Songs for the Saints Tour | 12,068 / 12,068 | $1,736,702 | |
| April 24 | Kodak Black | 147 CalBoy; Sniper Gang Music; 22Gz; Roddy Ricch | Dying to Live Tour | | | |
| April 26 | Snow Patrol | We Are Scientists | Wildness Tour | | | |
| April 27 | Davido | Vegedream; KeBlack; Nya-D; Naza | Coming to America Music Festival | | | |
| April 28 | Kali Uchis; Jorja Smith | —N/a | The Kali & Jorja Tour | | | |
| May 2 | Maren Morris | RaeLynn | Girl: The World Tour | | | |
| May 11 | Ben Platt | Ben Abraham; Wrabel | Sing to Me Instead Tour | | | |
| May 12 | Judas Priest | Uriah Heep | Firepower World Tour | 6,000 / 6,000 | $331,220 | |
| May 15 | Evanescence | VERIDIA | 2019 Tour | | | |
| May 17 | Juice Wrld | Ski Mask the Slump God; Smooky MarGielaa | Death Race for Love Tour | 6,000 / 6,000 | $313,500 | |
| May 21 | The 1975 | Pale Waves; No Rome | Music for Cars Tour | | | |
| May 25 | Passion Pit | The Beaches | 10th Anniversary Manners Tour | | | |
| May 30 | David Gray | —N/a | Gold In A Brass Age World Tour | | | |
| June 12 | Tim McGraw; Jon Meacham | —N/a | Songs of America Book Tour | | | |
| June 14 | Snarky Puppy | José James | 2019 Tour | | | |
| June 15 | Jon Batiste and Stay Human | Brass-A-Holics | 2019 Tour | | | |
| June 18 | The Lonely Island | Kate Berlant; John Early | 2019 Tour | 6,000 / 6,000 | $397,222 | |
| June 19 | The National | Courtney Barnett | I Am Easy to Find Tour | | | |
| June 20 | Billie Eilish | Denzel Curry | When We All Fall Asleep Tour | 6,000 / 6,000 | $302,907 | |
| June 29 | Hillsong United | Amanda Lindsey Cook; Mack Brock | The People Tour | | | |
| July 12 | Rob Thomas | Abby Anderson | Chip Tooth Tour | | | |
| July 26 | Blondie; Elvis Costello & the Imposters | —N/a | Co-Headlining Summer Tour | | | |
| July 30 | Violent Femmes; Ben Folds | Savannah Conley | Co-Headlining Tour | | | |
| August 6 | 21 Savage | DaBaby | I Am > I Was Tour | | | |
| August 8 | Rüfüs Du Sol | Monolink | Solace Tour | | | |
| August 13 | Bryan Ferry | Femme Schmidt | World Tour 2019 | | | |
| August 17 | The Raconteurs | Jacuzzi Boys | Help Us Stranger Tour | | | |
| August 24 | Tame Impala | Velvet Negroni | World Tour 2019 | 12,000 / 12,000 | $704,620 | |
| August 25 | Tame Impala | Velvet Negroni | World Tour 2019 | 12,000 / 12,000 | $704,620 | |
| September 4 | Of Monsters and Men | Lower Dens | Fever Dream Tour | 4,560 / 6,000 | $251,929 | |
| September 5 | Jenny Lewis | The Watson Twins | On the Line Tour | | | |
| September 6 | Phantogram | Bob Moses | 2019 Tour | | | |
| September 8 | Babymetal | Avatar | 2019 Tour | | | |
| September 11 | Peter Frampton | Jason Bonham's Led Zeppelin Evening | Peter Frampton Finale – The Farewell Tour | 2,782 / 6,000 | $325,282 | |
| September 12 | Judah & the Lion | —N/a | Pep Talks Worldwide Tour | | | |
| September 13 | Shakey Graves; Dr. Dog | —N/a | 2019 Tour | | | |
| September 14 | Andrew Bird | Chicano Batman | My Finest Work Yet Tour | | | |
| September 16 | Bloc Party | Cults | Silent Alarm Tour | | | |
| September 17 | The B-52's | Berlin; Orchestral Manoeuvres in the Dark | 2019 Tour | 4,349 / 6,000 | $282,335 | |
| September 18 | Marina | —N/a | Love + Fear Tour | 3,144 / 3,144 | $169,520 | |
| September 20 | Mac DeMarco | —N/a | 2019 Tour | | | |
| September 21 | Bastille | Joywave | Doom Days Tour | 5,430 / 6,000 | $259,830 | |
| September 24 | Massive Attack | —N/a | Mezzanine XXI Tour | 6,000 / 6,000 | $350,840 | |
| September 25 | Lizzo | Ari Lennox | Cuz I Love You Too Tour | 12,000 / 12,000 | $571,320 | |
| September 26 | Lizzo | Ari Lennox | Cuz I Love You Too Tour | 12,000 / 12,000 | $571,320 | |
| September 28 | Joe Russo's Almost Dead | —N/a | 2019 Tour | | | |
| September 29 | Catfish and the Bottlemen | —N/a | 2019 Tour | | | |
| October 3 | The Head and the Heart | —N/a | Living Mirage Tour | | | |
| October 4 | Zedd | Jax Jones; NOTD | The Orbit Tour | | | |
| October 5 | Lauv | Bülow | ~how i'm feeling~ World Tour | | | |
| October 7 | Maggie Rogers | Empress Of | Heard It in a Past Life Tour | | | |
| October 8 | Maggie Rogers | Empress Of | Heard It in a Past Life Tour | | | |
| October 11 | Katy Perry; Norah Jones; Mavis Staples | —N/a | Silence the Violence Benefit Concert | | | |
| October 12 | The Black Keys | Modest Mouse; Jessy Wilson | Let's Rock Tour | 6,000 / 6,000 | $815,000 | |
| October 15 | Wilco | Soccer Mommy | Ode to Joy Tour | | | |
| October 17 | Bon Iver | Feist | i, i Tour | | | |
| October 18 | Bon Iver | Feist | i, i Tour | | | |
| October 22 | Young Thug; Machine Gun Kelly | Polo G Strick | 2019 Tour | | | |
| October 25 | Sleater-Kinney | Joseph Keckler | The Center Won't Hold Tour | | | |
| October 26 | Alessia Cara | Ryland James | The Pains of Growing Tour | | | |
| October 31 | Umphrey's McGee | Star Kitchen | 2019 Tour | | | |
| November 15 | Eric Church | —N/a | Double Down Tour | 12,456 / 12,456 | $1,617,825 | |
| November 16 | Eric Church | —N/a | Double Down Tour | 12,456 / 12,456 | $1,617,825 | |
| November 18 | Hozier | Angie McMahon | Wasteland, Baby! Tour | | | |
| November 19 | Sara Bareilles | Emily King | Amidst the Chaos Tour | 6,195 / 12,000 | $537,795 | |
| November 20 | Sara Bareilles | Emily King | Amidst the Chaos Tour | 6,195 / 12,000 | $537,795 | |
| November 22 | Lettuce | Ghost-Note; Antibalas | Elevate Tour | | | |
| November 23 | Gesaffelstein | —N/a | Requiem Tour | | | |
| November 25 | Brockhampton | 100 gecs Slowthai | Heaven Belongs to You Tour | | | |
| November 29 | Deadmau5 | Monstergetdown; Attlas | 2019 Tour | 8,938 / 12,000 | $427,740 | |
| November 30 | Deadmau5 | Monstergetdown; Attlas | 2019 Tour | 8,938 / 12,000 | $427,740 | |
| December 3 | Cage the Elephant; Lovelytheband; Winnetka Bowling League | —N/a | DC101-DERLAND 2019 | | | |
| December 12 | Mumford & Sons; Cold War Kids; Shaed; White Reaper | —N/a | DC101-DERLAND 2019 | 6,000 / 6,000 | $442,815 | |
| December 5 | She & Him | Peter Lee | A Very She & Him Christmas Party | | | |
| December 8 | Bob Dylan | —N/a | Never Ending Tour 2019 | | | |
| December 13 | Tyler Childers | Liz Cooper & The Stampede | Country Squire Run | | | |

=== 2020 ===
| Date(s) | Headliner(s) | Supporting act(s) | Event / Tour | Attendance | Revenue | Ref. |
|---|---|---|---|---|---|---|
| January 20 | AJR | —N/a | The Neotheater World Tour | | | |
| January 23 | Lil Baby | Rod Wave | 2020 Tour | 5,262 / 6,000 | $284,891 | |
| January 25 | Grace Potter | Devon Gilfillian | Daylight Tour | 3,548 / 6,000 | $173,400 | |
| January 31 | Greensky Bluegrass | —N/a | Winter Tour 2020 | 5,642 / 12,000 | $257,146 | |
| February 1 | Greensky Bluegrass | —N/a | Winter Tour 2020 | 5,642 / 12,000 | $257,146 | |
| February 7 | Calexico; Iron & Wine | Frances Quinlan | Years to Burn Tour | | | |
| February 12 | Rex Orange County | —N/a | Pony Tour | | | |
| February 14 | Fitz and the Tantrums | TWIN XL | All the Feels Tour | | | |
| February 29 | The Revivalists | Tank and the Bangas | Into the Stars Tour | | | |
| March 4 | Dermot Kennedy | SYML | Without Fear Tour | | | |

=== 2021 ===
| Date(s) | Headliner(s) | Supporting act(s) | Event / Tour | Attendance | Revenue | Ref. |
|---|---|---|---|---|---|---|
| August 7 | Frankie Valli & the Four Seasons | —N/a | Greatest Hits | | | |
| August 15 | Jason Mraz | Southern Avenue | Look For The Good Live | | | |
| August 17 | Modest Mouse | The Districts | 2021 US Tour | | | |
| September 3 | Blake Shelton | Trace Adkins | Friends and Heroes 2021 Tour | | | |
| September 4 | Blake Shelton | Trace Adkins | Friends and Heroes 2021 Tour | | | |
| September 8 | Kesha | Betty Who | Kesha Live | | | |
| September 11 | King Crimson | The Zappa Band | Music Is Our Friend Tour | | | |
| September 21 | Juanes | —N/a | Origen Tour | | | |
| September 24 | Bleachers | —N/a | Take the Sadness Out of Saturday Tour | | | |
| September 26 | Violent Femmes; Flogging Molly | Me First and the Gimme Gimmes; Thick | 2021 Tour | | | |
| September 28 | Rufus Wainwright; José González | —N/a | Unfollow the Rules in the Local Valley Tour | | | |
| September 29 | Rebelution | Steel Pulse; Kabaka Pyramid; Keznamdi; DJ Mackle | Good Vibes Summer Tour 2021 | | | |
| September 30 | A Day to Remember | Asking Alexandria; Point North | The Re-Entry Tour | | | |
| October 1 | Trey Anastasio Band | —N/a | 2021 Tour | | | |
| October 4 | Jungle | Blu DeTiger | Jungle World Tour | | | |
| October 6 | Rodrigo y Gabriela | Silvana Estrada | 2021 Tour | | | |
| October 8 | Mt. Joy; Trampled by Turtles | —N/a | 2021 Tour | | | |
| October 9 | LANY | Jake Scott; Keshi | gg bb xx tour | | | |
| October 10 | Needtobreathe | Switchfoot; The New Respects | Into the Mystery Tour | | | |
| October 11 | Dead Can Dance | —N/a | An Evening with Dead Can Dance | | | |
| October 12 | James Blake | Fousheé | Friends That Break Your Heart Tour | | | |
| October 13 | Kaytranada | —N/a | Autumn '21 Tour | | | |
| October 14 | Future Islands | A Place to Bury Strangers | Calling Out in Space World Tour | | | |
| October 15 | Porter Robinson | Jai Wolf | The Nurture Live Tour | | | |
| October 19 | Porter Robinson | Jai Wolf | The Nurture Live Tour | | | |
| October 16 | Marc Rebillet | Dingleberry Dynasty | 2021 Tour | | | |
| October 25 | H.E.R. | Tone Stith; Maeta | Back of My Mind Tour | 6,000 / 6,000 | $490,360 | |
| October 29 | Pigeons Playing Ping Pong | SunSquabi | Fall Tour | | | |
| November 7 | Collective Soul | Better Than Ezra; Tonic | Just Looking Around Tour | | | |
| November 11 | Sylvan Esso | Lido Pimienta | 2021 Tour | | | |
| November 13 | Billy Strings | —N/a | 2021 Tour | | | |
| November 14 | John Fogerty | —N/a | 2021 Fall Tour | | | |
| November 16 | The Flaming Lips | Particle Kid | American Head American Tour | | | |
| November 17 | Purity Ring | Dawn Richard | Tour de Womb | | | |
| November 19 | Brothers Osborne | Travis Denning; Tenille Townes | We're Not For Everyone Tour | | | |
| November 21 | Mastodon; Opeth | Zeal & Ardor | 2021 Tour | | | |
| November 30 | Chvrches | Donna Missal | Screen Violence Tour | | | |
| December 2 | Bob Dylan | —N/a | Rough and Rowdy Ways World Wide Tour | | | |
| December 3 | Caamp | —N/a | Fall Tour | | | |
| December 10 | Eric Church | —N/a | Gather Again Tour | | | |
| December 11 | Eric Church | —N/a | Gather Again Tour | | | |
| December 31 | Rainbow Kitten Surprise | Briston Maroney | New Year's Eve at The Anthem | | | |

=== 2022 ===
| Date(s) | Headliner(s) | Supporting act(s) | Event / Tour | Attendance | Revenue | Ref. |
|---|---|---|---|---|---|---|
| February 2 | The War on Drugs | Caroline Kingsbury | I Don't Live Here Anymore Tour | | | |
| February 4 | Greensky Bluegrass | The Infamous Stringdusters | Stress Dreams Tour | | | |
| February 5 | Greensky Bluegrass | The Infamous Stringdusters | Stress Dreams Tour | | | |
| February 10 | Louis Tomlinson | Sun Room | Louis Tomlinson World Tour | 6,000 / 6,000 | $331,756 | |
| February 18 | Umphrey's McGee | —N/a | 2022 Winter Tour | | | |
| February 19 | Action Bronson; Earl Sweatshirt | The Alchemist; Boldy James | ÑBA Leather World Tour | | | |
| February 24 | Marina | Tove Styrke | Ancient Dreams in a Modern Land Tour | 3,290 / 3,290 | $174,340 | |
| February 26 | Alt-J; Portugal. The Man | Sir Chloe | 2022 Tour | | | |
| February 27 | Alt-J; Portugal. The Man | Sir Chloe | 2022 Tour | | | |
| March 4 | Madeon | Yung Bae | Good Faith Forever Tour | | | |
| March 11 | Khruangbin | Nubya Garcia | Space Walk Tour | | | |
| March 12 | Conan Gray | Bülow | Conan Gray World Tour | | | |
| March 18 | Glen Hansard; Markéta Irglová | —N/a | 2022 Tour | | | |
| March 20 | Jazmine Sullivan | —N/a | Heaux Tales Tour | | | |
| March 25 | Dark Star Orchestra | —N/a | 2022 Winter Tour | | | |
| March 27 | Mitski | Michelle | Laurel Hell Tour | | | |
| March 28 | Mitski | Michelle | Laurel Hell Tour | | | |
| March 29 | Glass Animals | Sad Night Dynamite | Dreamland Tour | | | |
| March 30 | Glass Animals | Sad Night Dynamite | Dreamland Tour | | | |
| March 31 | Snoh Aalegra | Ama Lou; Ogi | Ugh, These Temporary Highs Tour | | | |
| April 2 | Car Seat Headrest | Bartees Strange | North American Tour 2022 | | | |
| April 9 | Bright Eyes | Christian Lee Hutson | Bright Eyes Tour | | | |
| April 13 | Kaleo | Des Rocs | Fight or Flight Tour | | | |
| April 19 | Jack White | Men I Trust | Supply Chain Issues Tour | | | |
| April 21 | Big Thief | —N/a | 2022 North American Tour | | | |
| April 22 | Dustin Lynch | Sean Stemaly | Party Mode Tour | | | |
| May 4 | Olivia Rodrigo | Holly Humberstone | Sour Tour | 6,000 / 6,000 | $323,500 | |
| May 6 | LP | Nick Leng | Churches Tour | | | |
| May 7 | Disclosure | DJ Boring | 2022 Tour | | | |
| May 10 | Interpol | Tycho; Matthew Dear | 2022 Tour | | | |
| May 13 | Haim | Faye Webster | One More Haim Tour | | | |
| May 14 | Haim | Faye Webster | One More Haim Tour | | | |
| May 17 | Deftones; Gojira | VOWWS | Spring 2022 Tour | | | |
| June 3 | Ray LaMontagne | —N/a | The Monovision Tour | | | |
| June 5 | Bastille | —N/a | Give Me The Future Tour | | | |
| June 6 | Sigur Rós | —N/a | World Tour | | | |
| June 8 | Flume | Tinashe; Jim-E Stack | 2022 Tour | | | |
| June 9 | Flume | Tinashe; Jim-E Stack | 2022 Tour | | | |
| June 11 | Phoebe Bridgers | Claud | Reunion Tour | | | |
| June 12 | Phoebe Bridgers | Claud | Reunion Tour | | | |
| June 16 | Rebelution | Steel Pulse; DENM; DJ Mackle | Good Vibes Summer Tour | | | |
| June 17 | Lawrence; MisterWives | Winnetka Bowling League | Sounds of Summer Tour | | | |
| June 18 | Citizen Cope | Alice Smith | Spring 2022 Anniversary Tour | | | |
| June 19 | Kraftwerk | —N/a | 3D Tour | | | |
| June 21 | Wallows | Spill Tab | Tell Me That It's Over Tour | | | |
| June 22 | Flogging Molly; The Interrupters | Tiger Army; The Skints | 2022 Tour | | | |
| June 25 | Tash Sultana | —N/a | Terra Firma Tour | | | |
| July 5 | 5 Seconds of Summer | Pale Waves | Take My Hand World Tour | | | |
| July 19 | The Cult | Black Rebel Motorcycle Club; Zola Jesus | 2022 Tour | | | |
| July 24 | Beach House | Mary Lattimore | Once Twice Melody Tour | | | |
| July 26 | Coheed and Cambria | Alkaline Trio; Mothica | Great Destroyer Tour | | | |
| July 27 | Polo & Pan | Warner Case | cyclorama tour | | | |
| July 29 | Old Crow Medicine Show | —N/a | Paint This Town Tour | | | |
| August 6 | Charli XCX | Elio | Crash: The Live Tour | 6,000 / 6,000 | $298,875 | |
| August 7 | Kehlani | Rico Nasty | blue water road Tour | | | |
| August 10 | Leon Bridges | Little Dragon | The Boundless Tour | 6,000 / 6,000 | $405,900 | |
| August 12 | Coin | Blackstarkids | Uncanny Valley Tour | | | |
| August 19 | The Shins | Joseph | Oh, Inverted World Tour | | | |
| August 21 | Blondie | The Damned | Against the Odds Tour | | | |
| August 23 | Local Natives | —N/a | Inside an Hourglass Tour | | | |
| August 25 | Lauv | Hayley Kiyoko | All 4 Nothing Tour | | | |
| August 29 | Lorde | Jim-E Stack | Solar Power Tour | | | |
| September 2 | Carín León | —N/a | 2022 Tour | | | |
| September 9 | Lake Street Dive | Allen Stone | 2022 Tour | | | |
| September 14 | Idles | Injury Reserve | Crawler Tour | | | |
| September 15 | Big Wild | Biig Piig | The Efferusphere Tour | | | |
| September 16 | Phoenix | Porches | Alpha Zulu Tour | | | |
| September 18 | Porcupine Tree | —N/a | CLOSURE/CONTINUATION Tour | | | |
| September 20 | Father John Misty | Suki Waterhouse | Chloë and The Next 20th Century Tour | | | |
| September 23 | Alec Benjamin | Claire Rosinkranz | The (Un)Commentary Tour | | | |
| September 25 | Lil Nas X | —N/a | Long Live Montero Tour | 6,000 / 6,000 | $402,950 | |
| September 26 | Rosalía | —N/a | Motomami World Tour | 6,000 / 6,000 | $553,258 | |
| September 27 | Death Cab for Cutie | Thao | Asphalt Meadows Tour | | | |
| September 28 | Kelsea Ballerini | Georgia Webster | Heartfirst Tour | | | |
| September 29 | Carly Rae Jepsen | Empress Of | The So Nice Tour | 5,391 / 5,391 | $263,526 | |
| October 1 | The B-52s | KC and the Sunshine Band | Farewell Tour | | | |
| October 3 | The Mars Volta | Teri Gender Bender | Reunion Tour | | | |
| October 5 | The Gaslight Anthem | Jeff Rosenstock | Reunion Tour | | | |
| October 9 | Turnstile | Snail Mail; JPEGMafia | Turnstile Love Connection Tour | | | |
| October 10 | Demi Lovato | Royal & the Serpent | Holy Fvck Tour | 3,053 / 3,053 | $231,077 | |
| October 11 | Jack Harlow | City Girls | Come Home The Kids Miss You Tour | 6,000 / 6,000 | $416,660 | |
| October 12 | The Killers | Johnny Marr | Imploding the Mirage Tour | 6,000 / 6,000 | $854,125 | |
| October 14 | Giveon | RIMON | Give or Take Tour | | | |
| October 15 | Joji | Dhruv; SavageRealm | Smithereens Tour | 6,000 / 6,000 | $343,050 | |
| October 17 | Nathaniel Rateliff & the Night Sweats | Hiss Golden Messenger | 2022 Tour | | | |
| October 22 | Mt. Joy | The Brook & the Bluff | Orange Blood Tour | | | |
| October 23 | King Gizzard & the Lizard Wizard | Leah Senior | USA + Canada 2022 Tour | | | |
| October 27 | Arcade Fire | —N/a | WE Tour | 16,079 / 16,079 | $1,172,885 | |
| October 28 | Arcade Fire | —N/a | WE Tour | 16,079 / 16,079 | $1,172,885 | |
| October 29 | Arcade Fire | —N/a | WE Tour | 16,079 / 16,079 | $1,172,885 | |
| November 4 | Trampled by Turtles | Amigo the Devil | 2022 Tour | | | |
| November 9 | The Revivalists | Paris Jackson | 2022 Tour | | | |
| November 10 | The 1975 | Blackstarkids | At Their Very Best | 6,000 / 6,000 | $475,825 | |
| November 12 | Joe Russo's Almost Dead | —N/a | 2022 Tour | | | |
| November 17 | Omar Apollo | Ravyn Lenae | Prototype Tour | | | |
| November 18 | Billy Strings | —N/a | 2022 Fall Tour | | | |
| November 19 | Billy Strings | —N/a | 2022 Fall Tour | | | |
| November 23 | The Smile | —N/a | A Light For Attracting Attention Tour | | | |
| December 3 | Stromae | Sho Madjozi | Multitude Tour | | | |
| December 5 | Måneskin | —N/a | Loud Kids World Tour | 6,000 / 6,000 | $323,500 | |
| December 9 | Gryffin | Surf Mesa; Far Out | Alive Tour | | | |
| December 13 | Foals | Inner Wave; Glove | Life Is Yours Tour | | | |
