= At Their Very Best =

2022–23 concert tour by the 1975

- World tour by The 1975
- Promotional poster
- Location: Asia; Europe; North America; Oceania; South America
- Associated album: Being Funny in a Foreign Language
- Start date: 3 November 2022
- End date: 16 August 2023
- Legs: 7
- No. of shows: 93
- Supporting acts: American Football; Blackstarkids; Bleachers; Cigarettes After Sex; The Japanese House; Bonnie Kemplay; Matty; Caroline Polachek; Wallice; Naya
- Website: the1975.com/tour

The 1975 concert chronology
- Music for Cars (2018–2020); At Their Very Best (2022–2023); Still... At Their Very Best (2023–2024)

At Their Very Best was the fourth concert tour by English indie art pop band the 1975 in support of their fifth studio album Being Funny in a Foreign Language (2022). It had a total of seven legs with 93 cumulative shows across North America, South America, Europe, Asia, and Oceania.

Written and directed by frontman Matty Healy, the show received unanimous critical acclaim, with praise on the concept, production, boundary-pushing staging, and Healy's performance. Rolling Stone declared it as "a defining blueprint on how to do arena shows" and "the most impressive live show" of 2022. A follow-up tour, with newly expanded production, commenced in arenas in North America in 2023 titled Still... At Their Very Best.

== Background ==
The band was set to embark on the 2021 shows of Music for Cars tour but ultimately cancelled the entire tour due to the COVID-19 pandemic. However, they have confirmed that they have been working on their fifth studio album. On 29 June 2022, the band announced the album titled Being Funny in a Foreign Language, releasing it on 14 October the same year.

The group announced the tour along with its North American dates on 3 August 2022. It was followed by UK and Ireland tour dates, announced on 1 September 2022.

On 13 February 2023, the group announced a headlining concert at the Finsbury Park, deemed as their "biggest UK headline show ever".

== Concert synopsis ==
The show was written and directed by frontman Healy. The set, modeled after the interior of a suburban home, was designed by the band's frequent collaborator Tobias Rylander, and is adorned with antique furniture, bedside lamps, and old televisions embedded with LED screens to display concert visuals. On one end of the stage is a large spiral staircase, while the other end is covered by a roof atop which Healy performs the song "I Like America and America Likes Me". At the center of the stage is a large door frame that evokes the rectangle symbol present across the cover art for the band's early discography. The set is also surrounded by windowsills through which more stage lights are projected, as well as a large streetlamp that hangs over the roof of the house. Rylander cited Stanley Kubrick as an inspiration for the set, aiming to create a contrast between the "cozy" suburban backdrop and the darker undertones of Healy's performance onstage.

The show is split into two parts: the first half (The 1975 Presents: Being Funny in a Foreign Language) was characterized by The Observer as "part performance art, part stage play, part Charlie Kaufman movie about a rock star in crisis," and the second half (At Their Very Best) as a traditional concert that incorporates more of the band's past discography.

"The first part of the show is about me. It’s about how if you’re a single guy and you’ve spent a year or so alone on the internet, you go mental. The show is about looking at masculinity, looking at being famous. It’s about what’s real and what’s sincere and not sincere."

— Healy, 2023

The two halves were separated by an interlude titled "Consumption" where Healy depicts masturbation, eats a raw steak, and delivers 20 press-ups in immediate succession in front of television screens showing news clips, which he then appears to climb into. In the US leg of the tour, Healy got a tattoo on stage that read "iM a MaN". Healy has also invited both male and female members of his audience to kiss him during his performance of the song "Robbers" and, on one occasion, sucked a fan's thumb. The Guardian said it sparked conversations regarding consent, fantasy and art in 2022, and noted that Healy asked for fans' permission first.

== Set list ==
This set list is representative of the show on 8 January 2023 in Brighton, England. It does not represent all dates throughout the tour.

1. "The 1975" (Being Funny in a Foreign Language)
2. "Looking for Somebody (To Love)"
3. "Happiness"
4. "Part of the Band"
5. "'Oh Caroline"
6. "I'm in Love with You"
7. "All I Need to Hear"
8. "Roadkill"
9. "I Couldn't Be More in Love"
10. "Fallingforyou"
11. "I Like America & America Likes Me"
12. "About You"
13. "When We Are Together"
14. "If You're Too Shy (Let Me Know)
15. "TooTimeTooTimeTooTime"
16. "Chocolate"
17. "It's Not Living (If It's Not with You)"
18. "Paris"
19. "Robbers"
20. "Somebody Else"
21. "Love It If We Made It"
22. "The Sound"
23. "Sex"
24. "Give Yourself a Try"

=== Special guests ===
- Phoebe Bridgers performed The 1975's "Milk" during the concert on 28 November 2022 in Inglewood, California.
- Jack Antonoff and Zem Audu performed a medley of Bleachers' "All My Heroes" and "Rollercoaster" during the concert on 29 November 2022 in San Francisco.
- Taylor Swift performed The 1975's "The City" and a debut live performance of her single "Anti-Hero" during the concert on 12 January 2023 in London, England.
- Charli XCX performed "Vroom Vroom" during the concert on 20 January 2023 in Manchester, England.
- Tim Healy performed a cover of "All I Need to Hear" in Newcastle, England, then reprising this performance for the band's Finsbury Park concert.
- Lewis Capaldi performed covers of "Antichrist" and Taylor Swift's "Love Story" during the concert on 25 January 2023 in Newcastle, England.

== Reception ==
The show received unanimous critical acclaim with five star reviews from the Rolling Stone, NME, The Observer, The Telegraph, Evening Standard, and Metro, among others. Rolling Stone declared it as "a defining blueprint on how to do arena shows" and "the most impressive live show" of 2022, with the Evening Standard declaring the 1975 as "the most compelling pop band on the planet".

Clips from the show went viral on TikTok and other social media platforms, prompting wide media coverage of his onstage actions. In Rolling Stone's review of the performance, the magazine stated that Healy delivered "a subversive and surreal take on modern masculinity [that] when viewed in isolation on social media, that all-importance nuance is entirely absent."

On 21 July 2023, while performing in Malaysia, the organisers of the Good Vibes Festival forced the band to prematurely end their performance under pressure by the authorities after Healy criticised the country's widespread anti-LGBTQ+ laws and kissed fellow bandmate Ross MacDonald. Healy stated that he "made a mistake. When we were booking shows, I wasn't looking into it. [...] So I pulled the show yesterday and we had a conversation, we said 'you know what, we can't let the kids down because they're not the government'". Malaysian authorities forced the organisers to immediately halt and cancelled the rest of the three-day festival citing that Healy's "controversial conduct and remarks" are "against the traditions and values of the local culture". Human rights and LGBT activist Peter Tatchell, writing for The Guardian wrote that criticism of Healy and the band "deflect attention from where the criticisms should be most urgently directed: against the homophobia of the Kuala Lumpur regime." He also expressed that Healy is no white saviour for showing solidarity to the community as "queer rights are a universal human right, not a western one". On 23 July 2023, the band announced the cancellation of their concerts in Jakarta and Taipei, citing "current circumstances" that made it "impossible to proceed with the scheduled shows". Accordingly, this made Singapore the only stand-alone Asian stop for Leg 6. (Note: The stops in Kuala Lumpur/Sepang and Jakarta were scheduled to be a part of Good Vibes and We The Fest festivals respectively while Taipei was scheduled to be a stand-alone concert.)

== Broadcast ==
The sold-out show at Madison Square Garden on 7 November 2022 was livestreamed globally on Twitch, presented by Amazon Music. A live recording was released on Amazon Prime Video and premiered on 6 January 2023.

== Gallery ==
Photos taken on the tour's 14 December 2022 sold out show in Minnesota depicting a partial view of the stage design modified with Christmas lights.

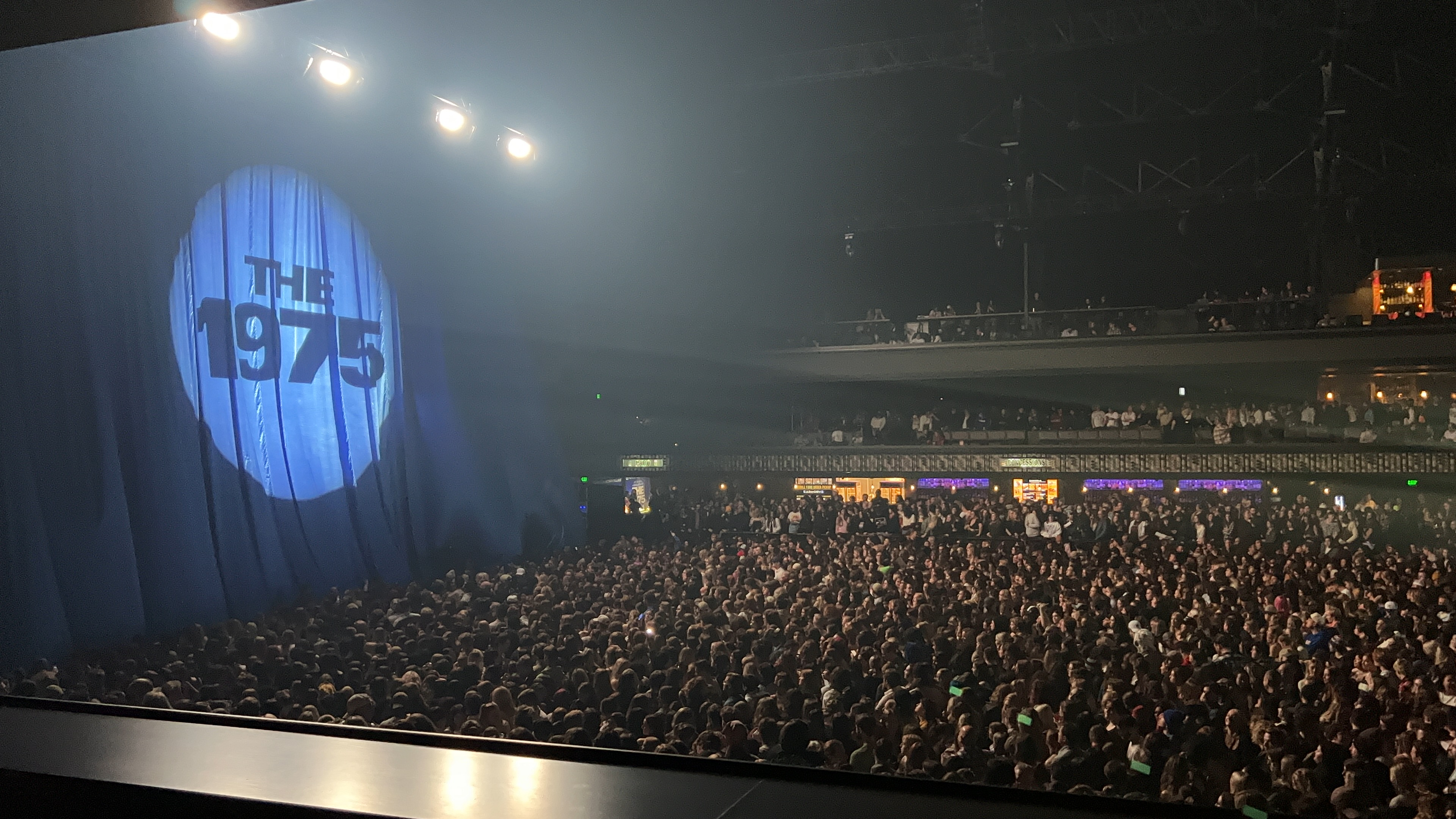

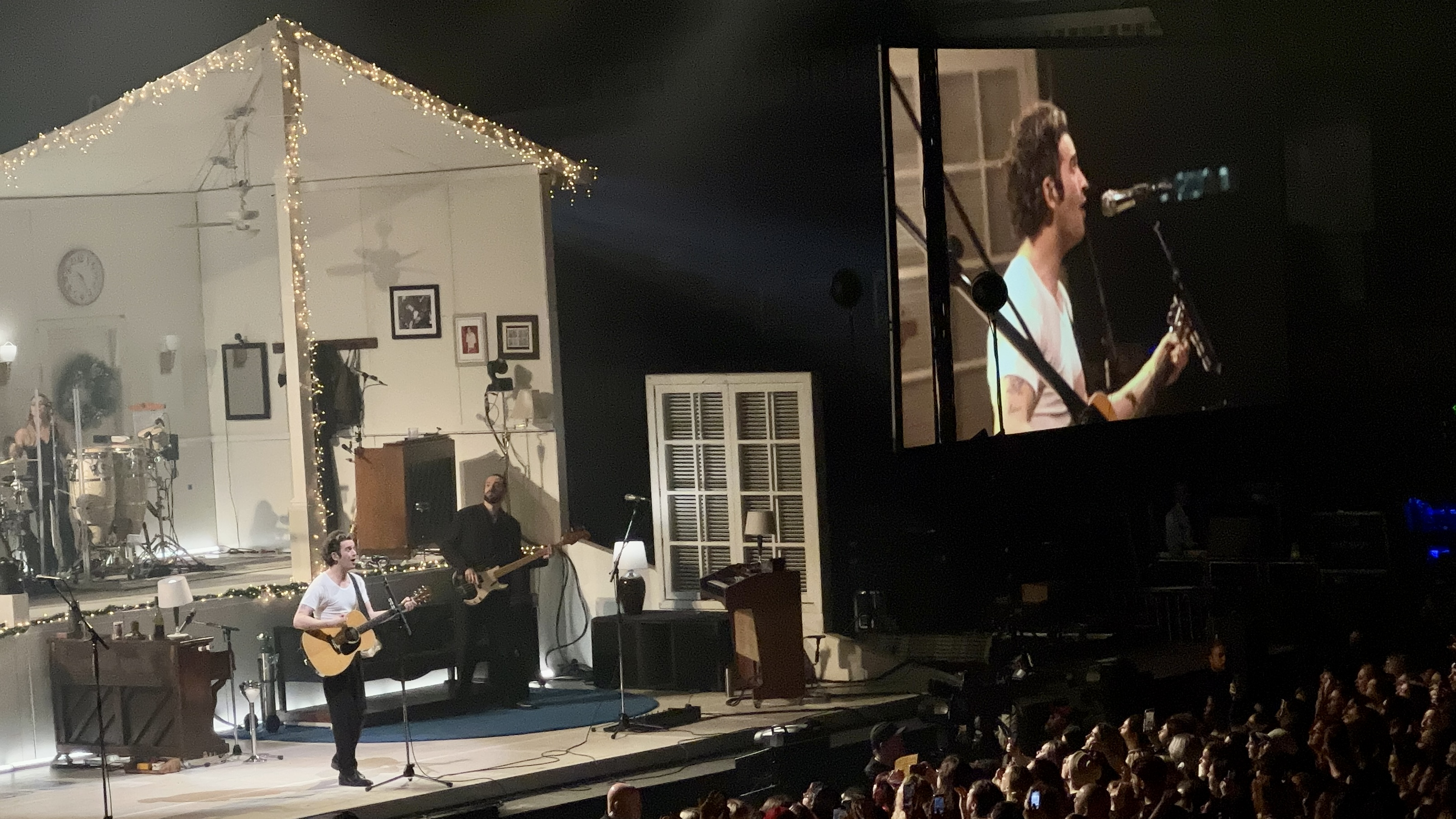

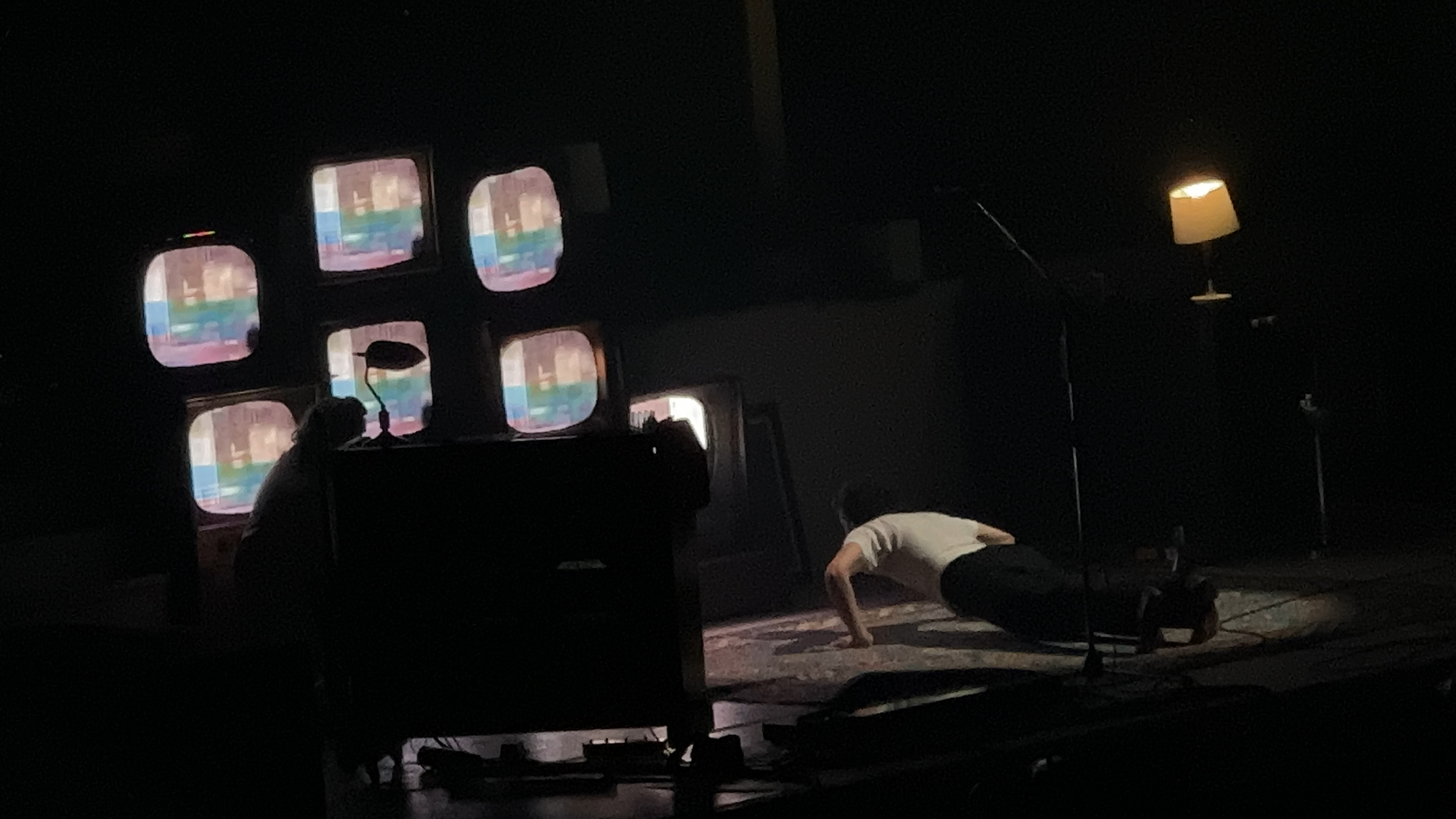

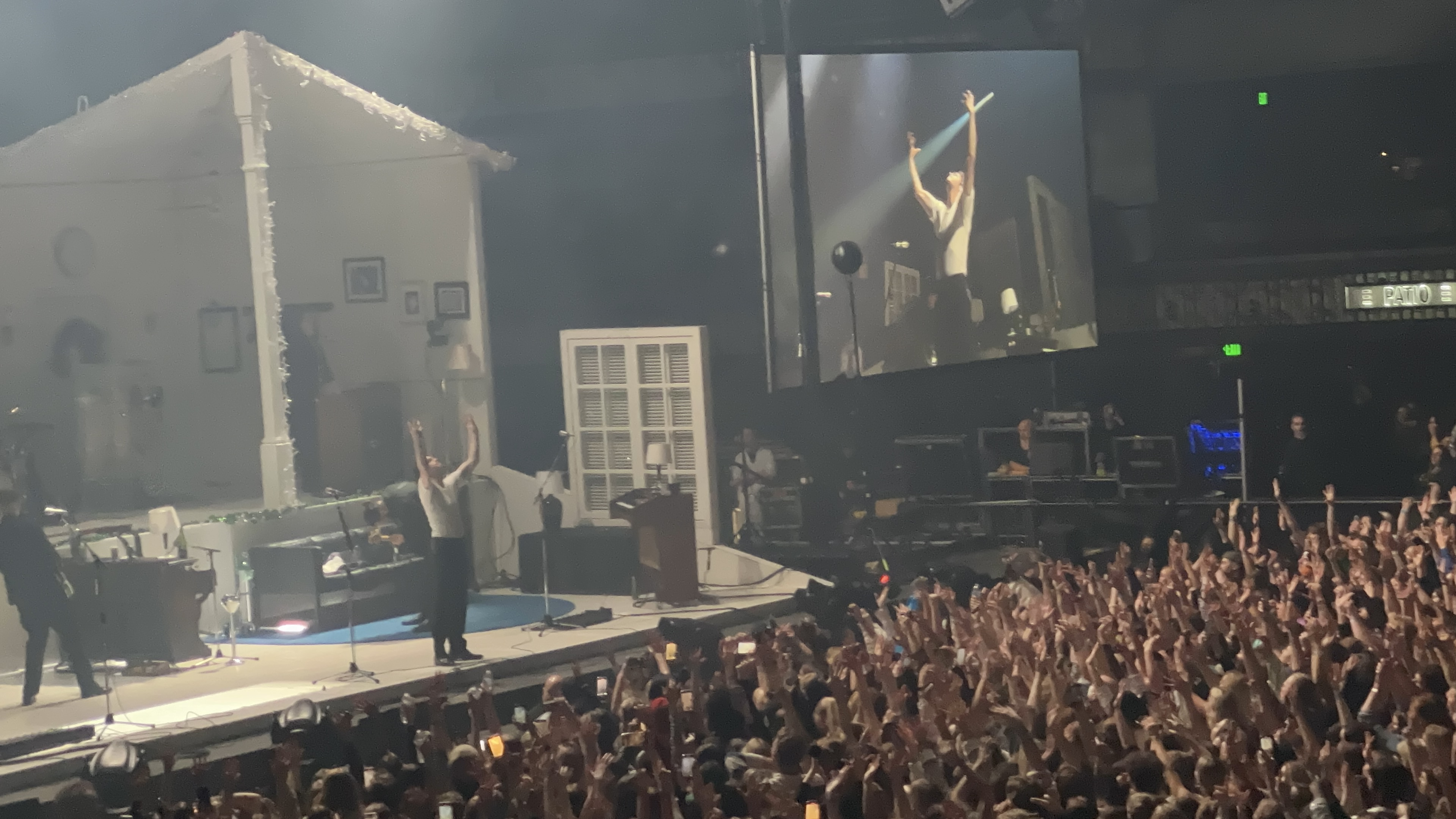

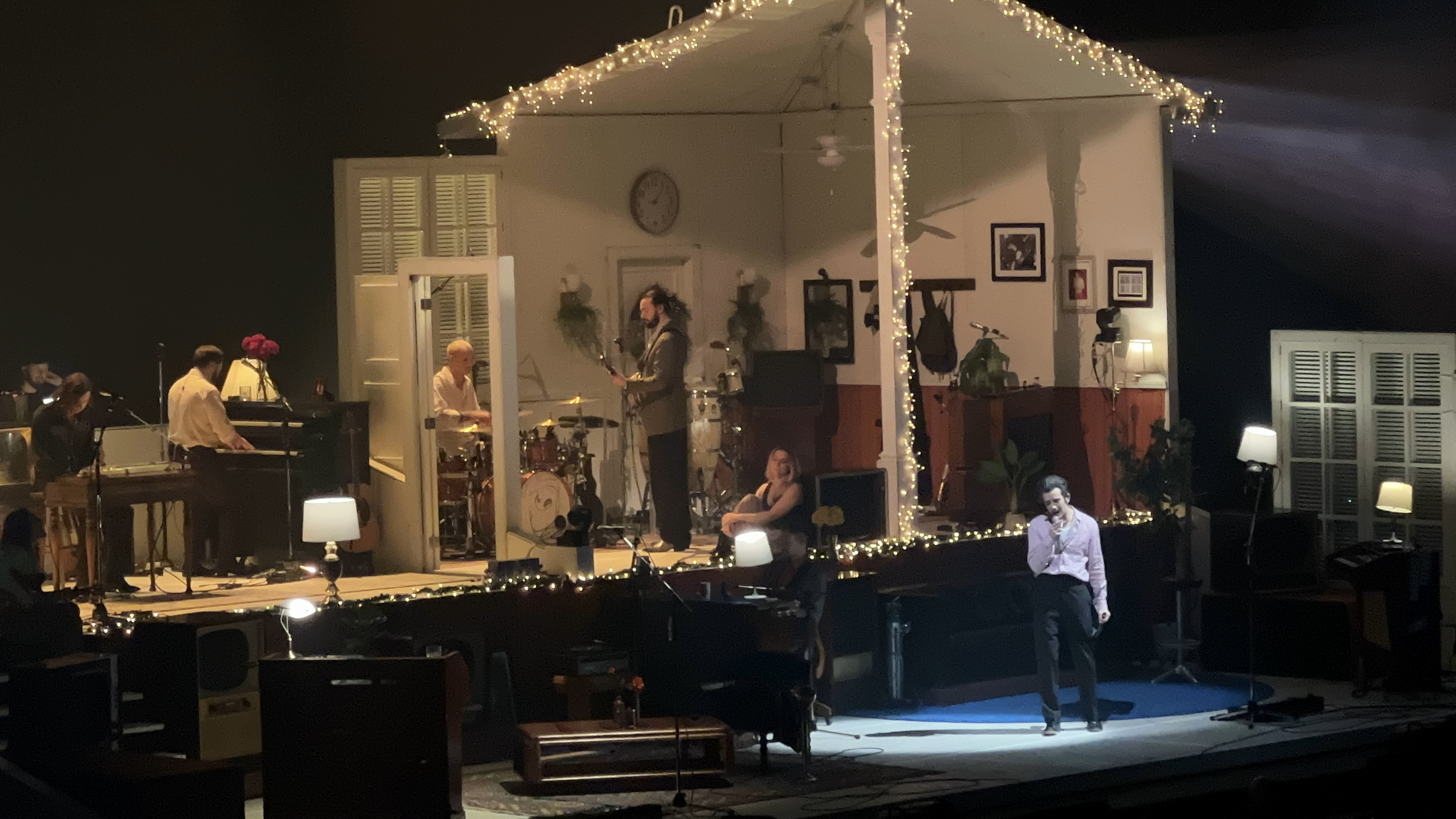

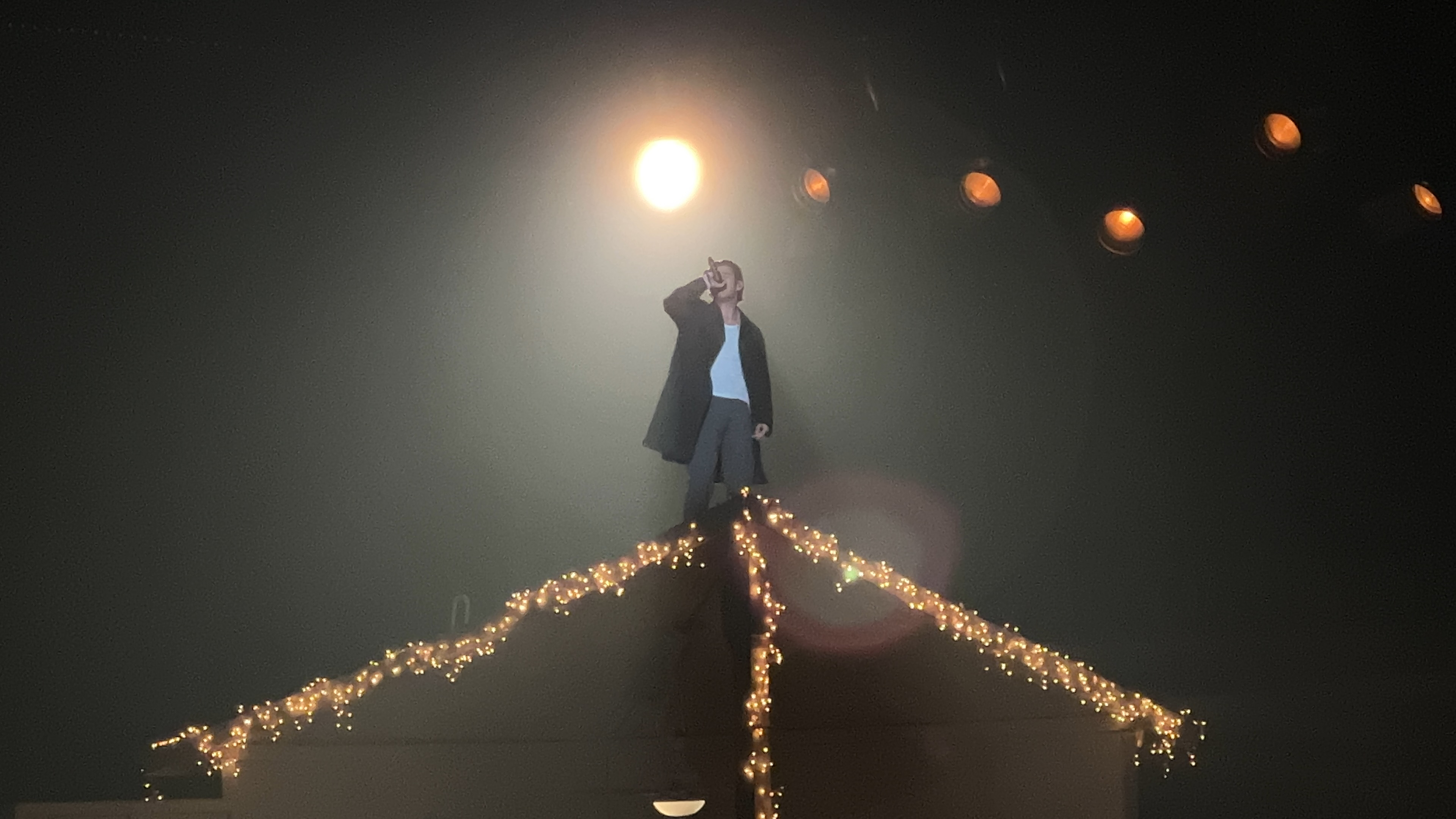

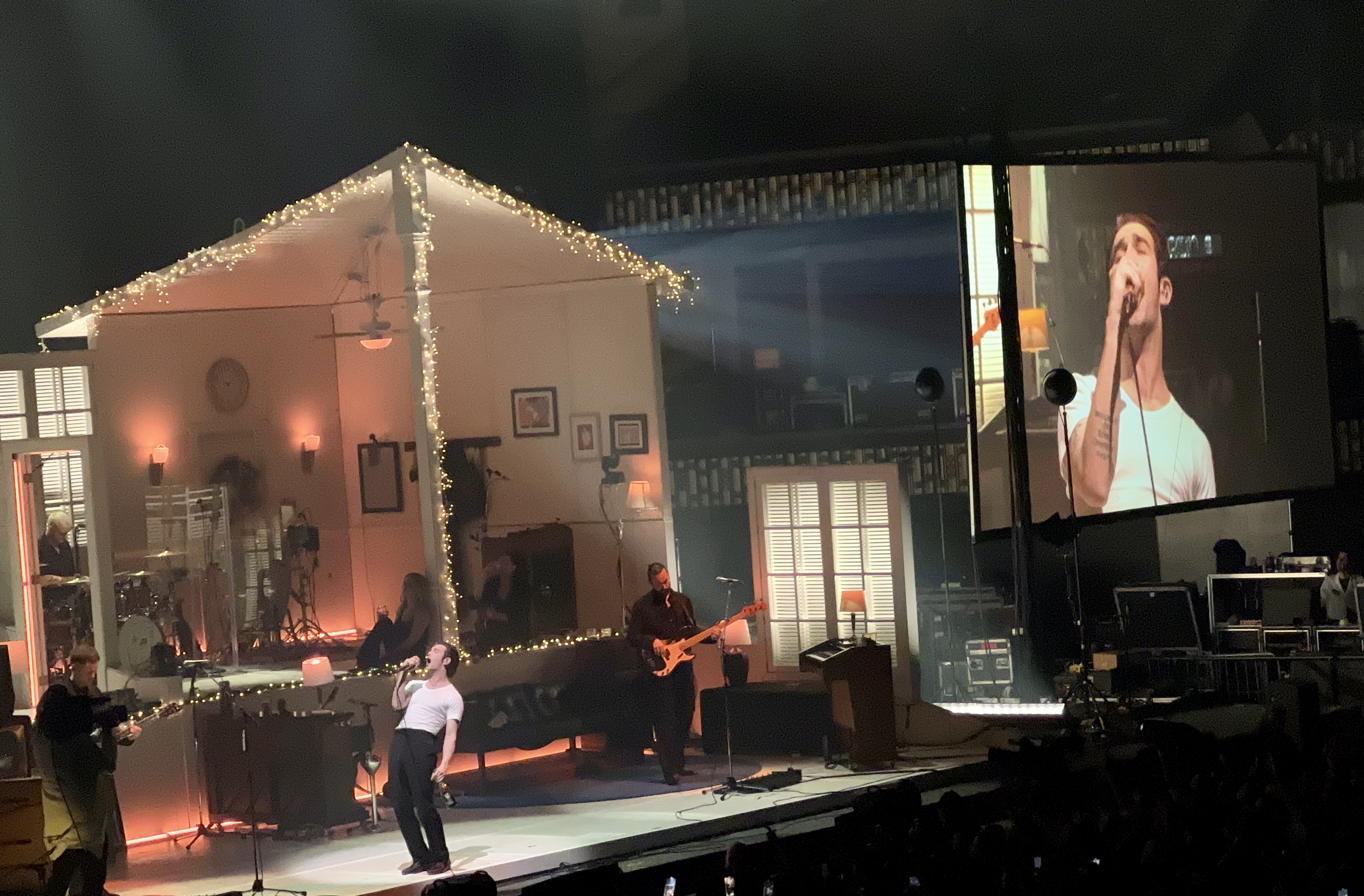

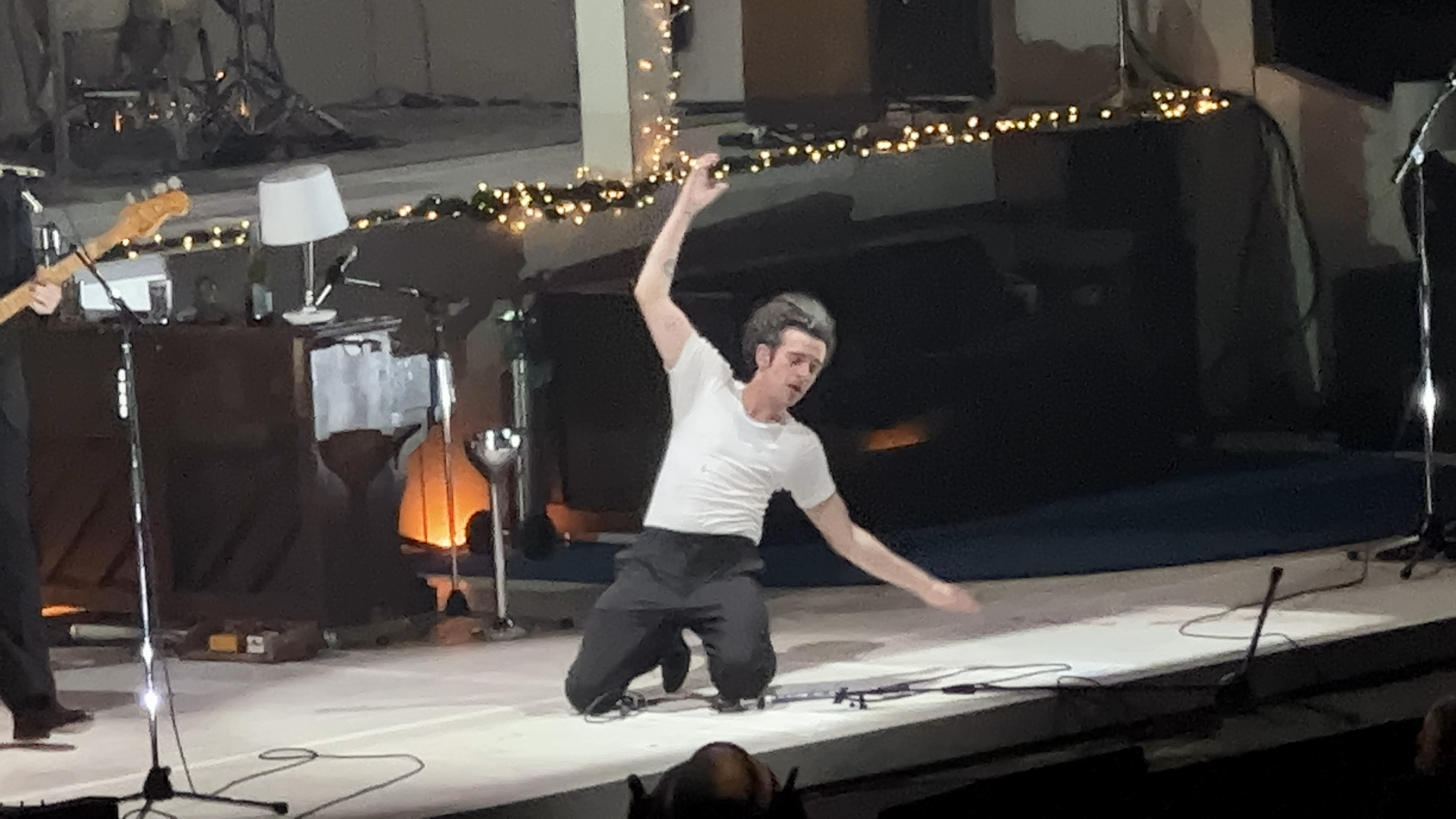

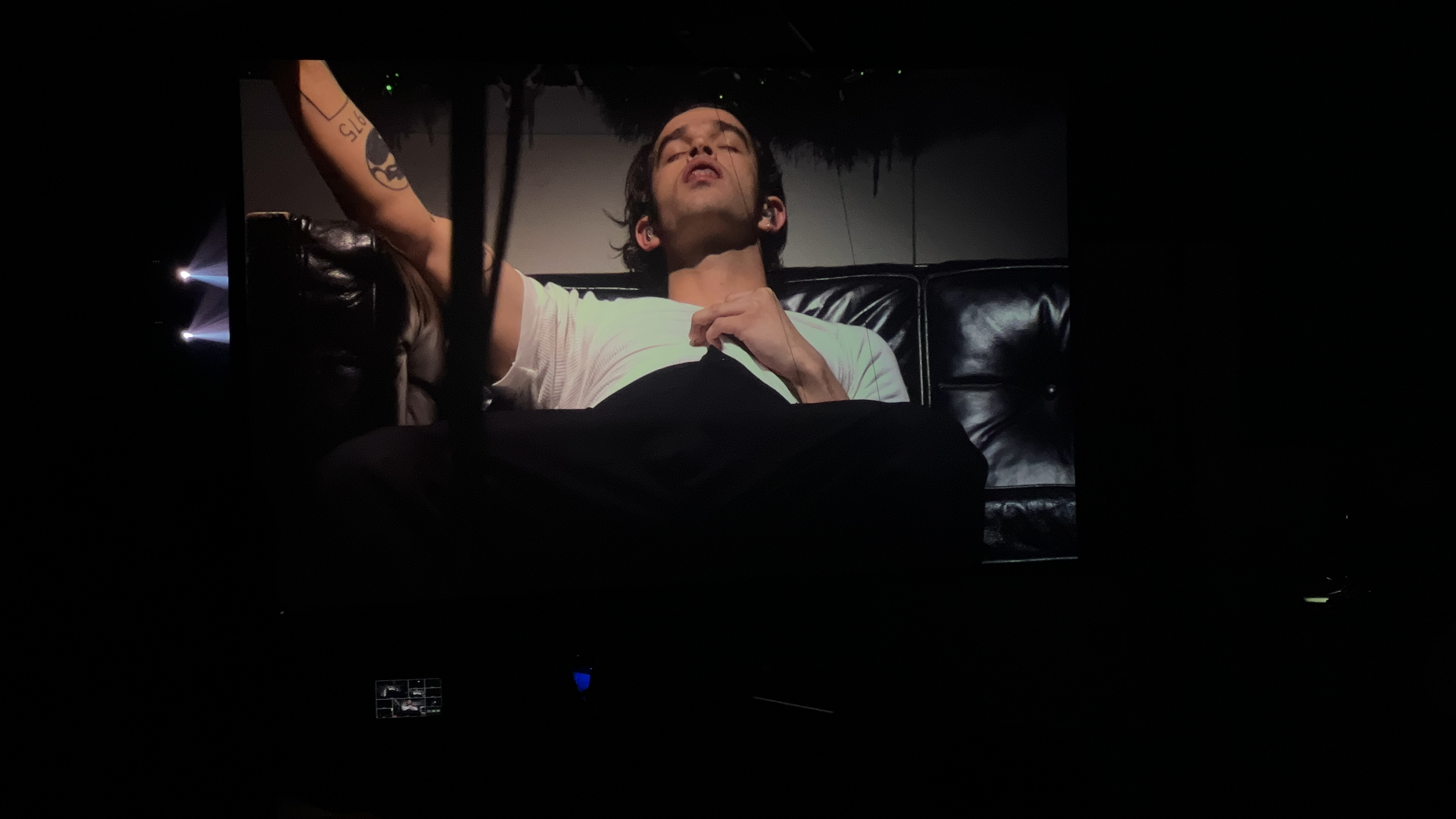

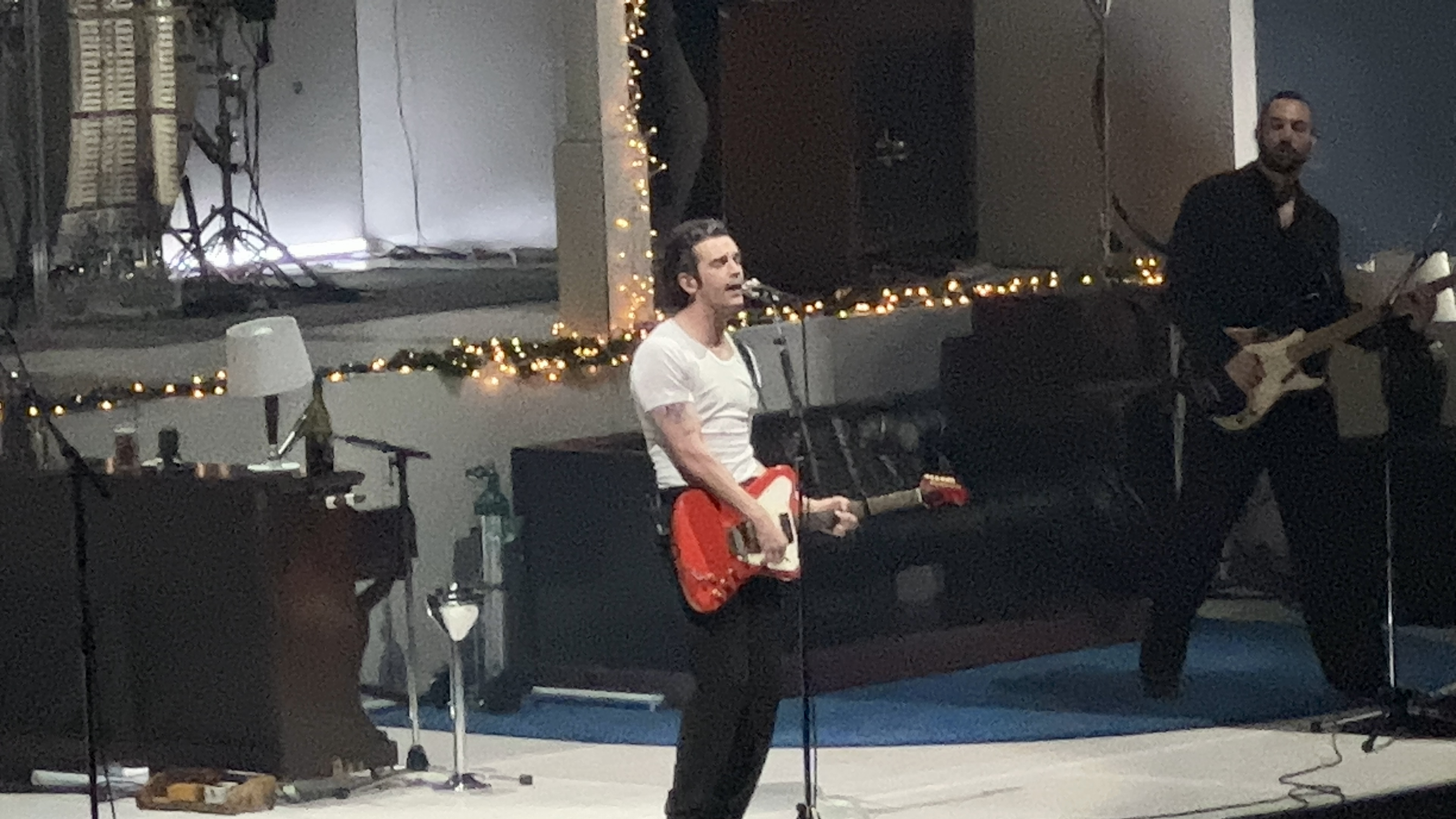

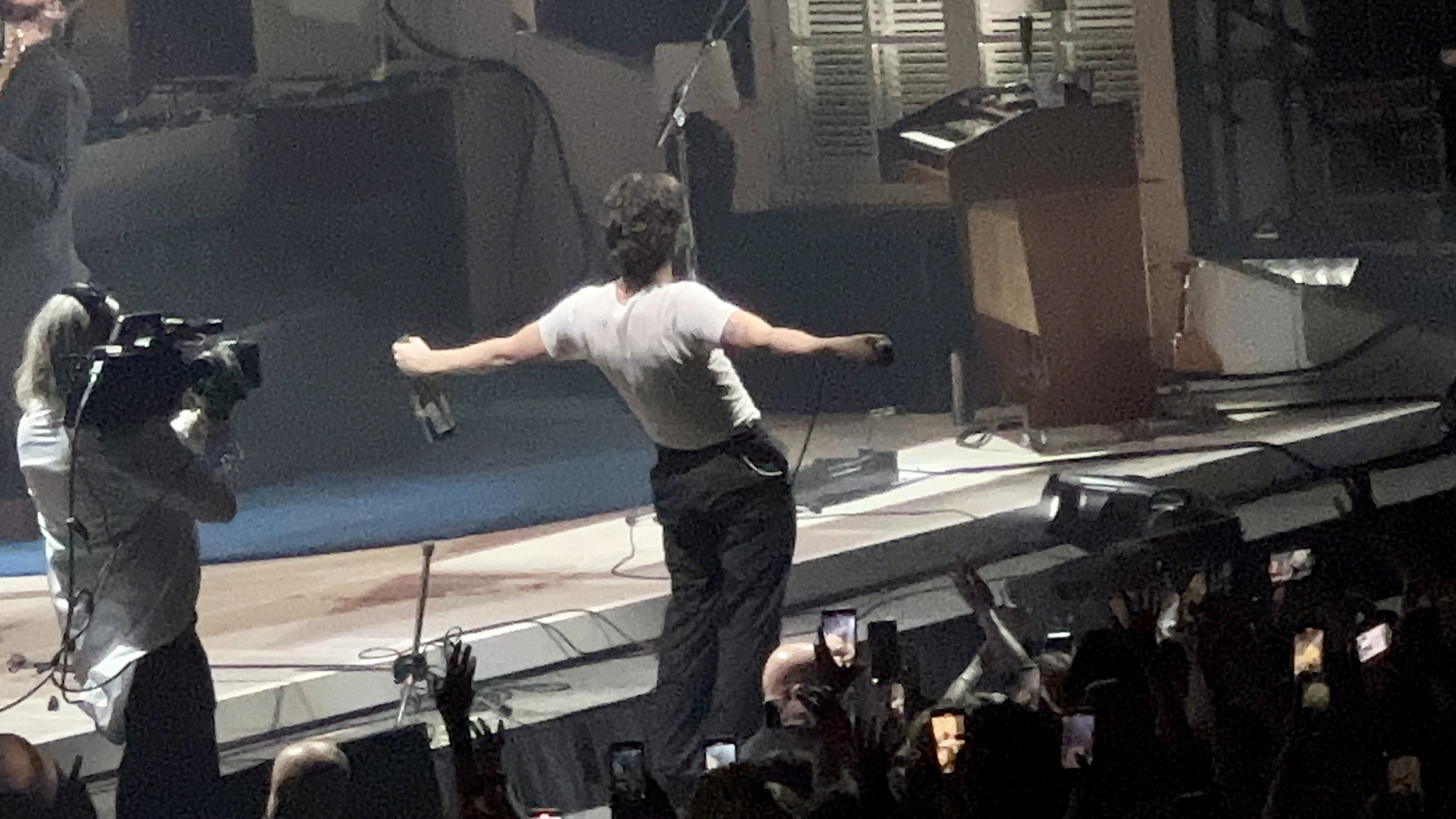

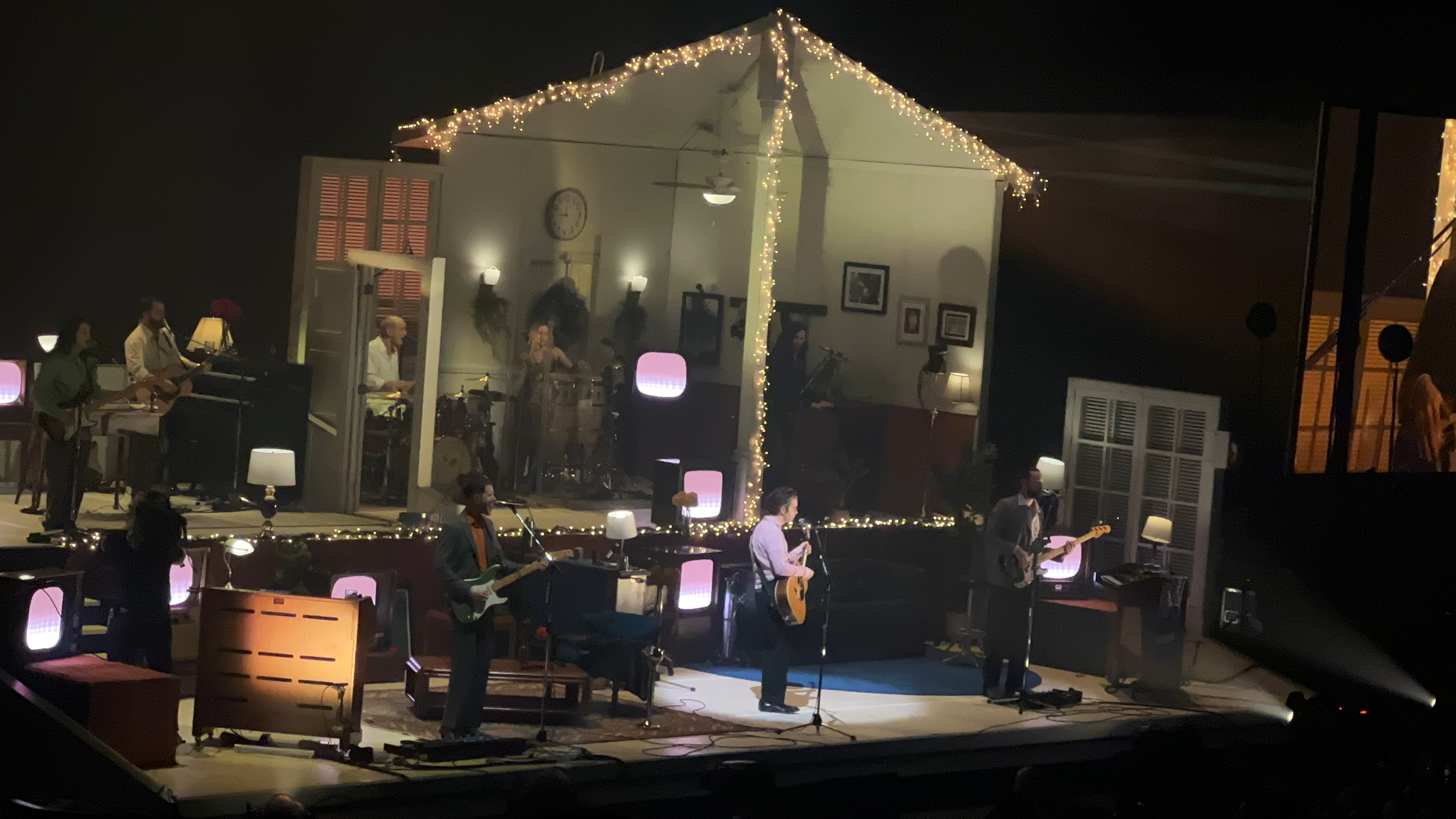

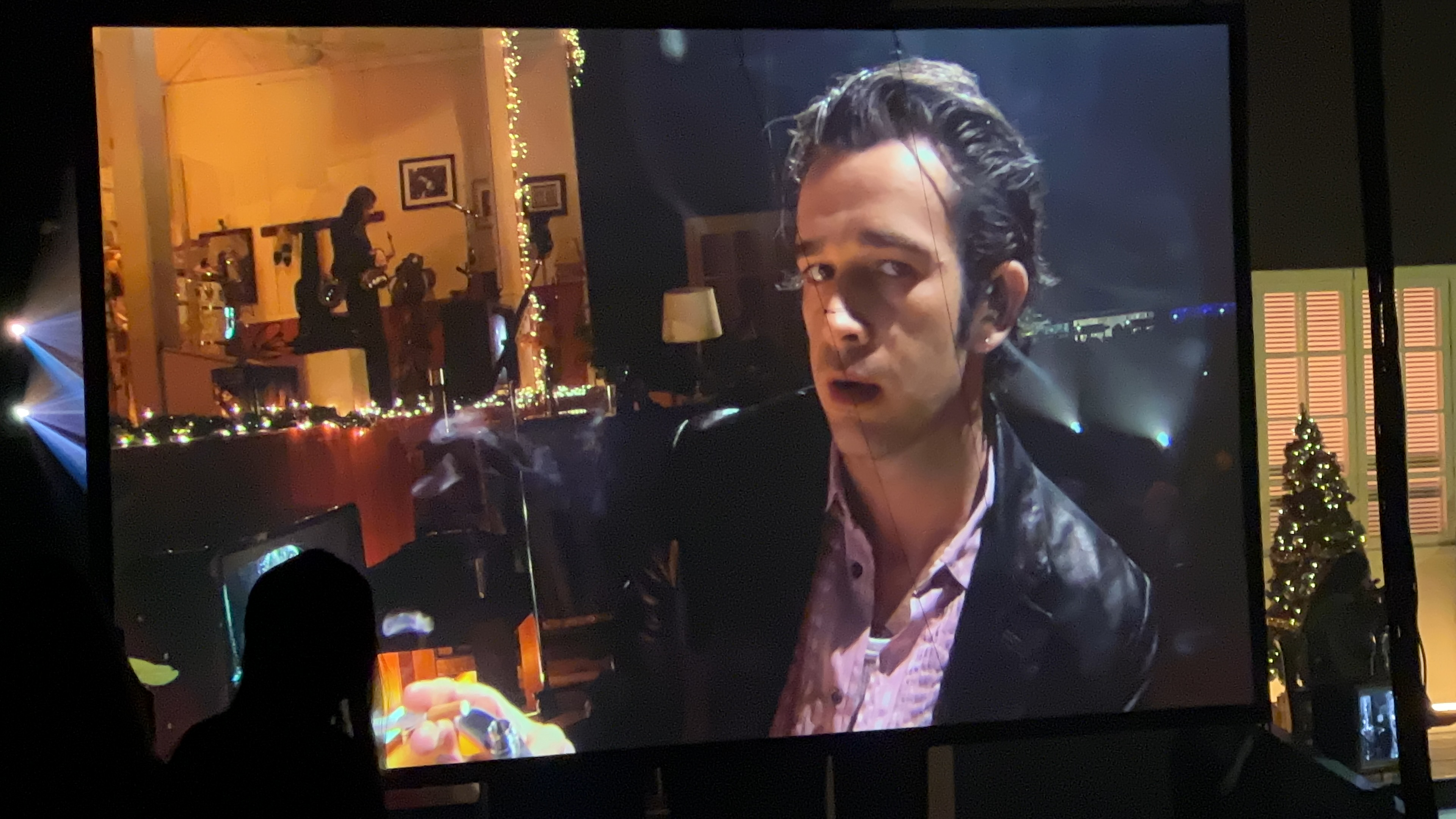

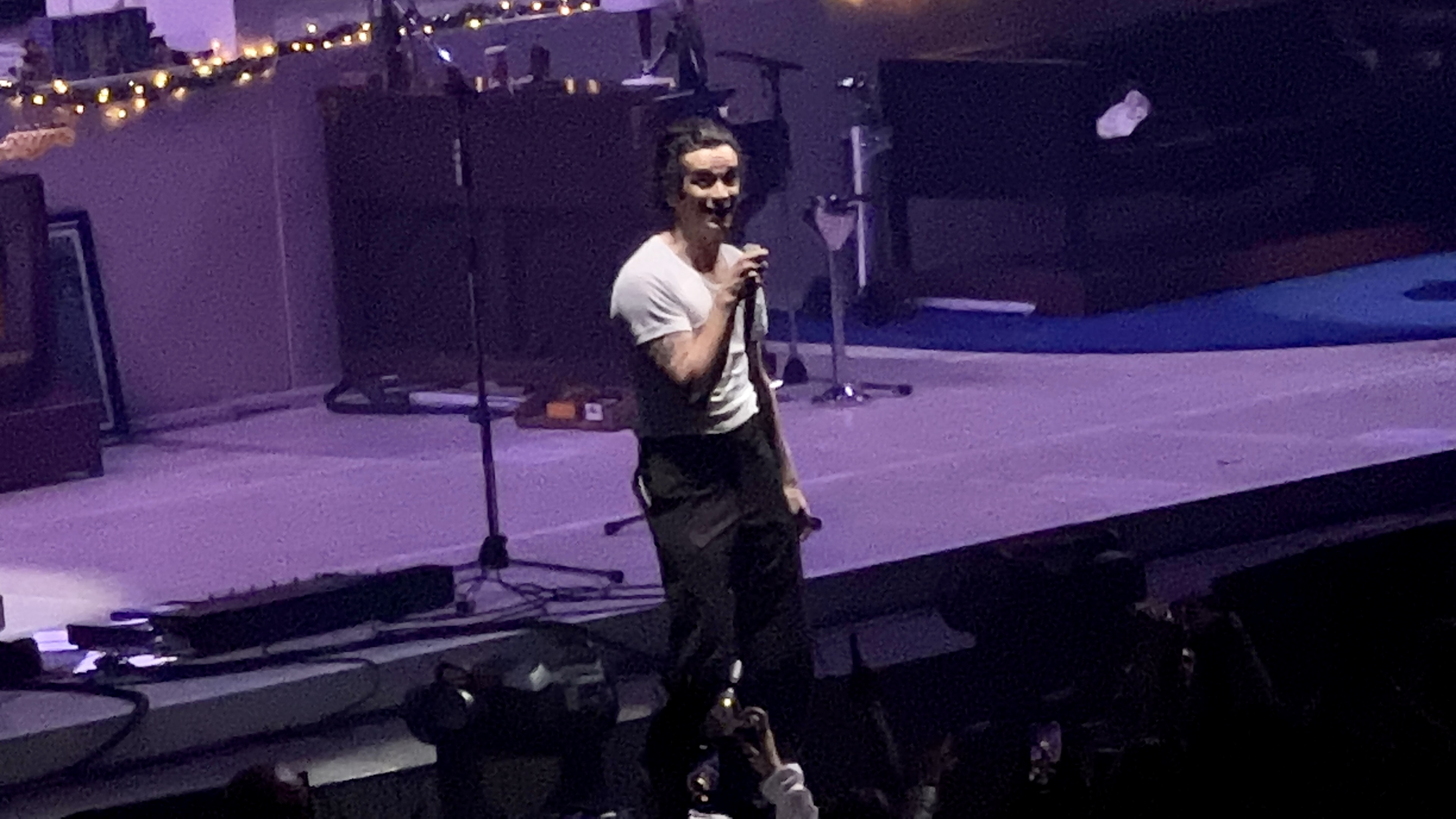

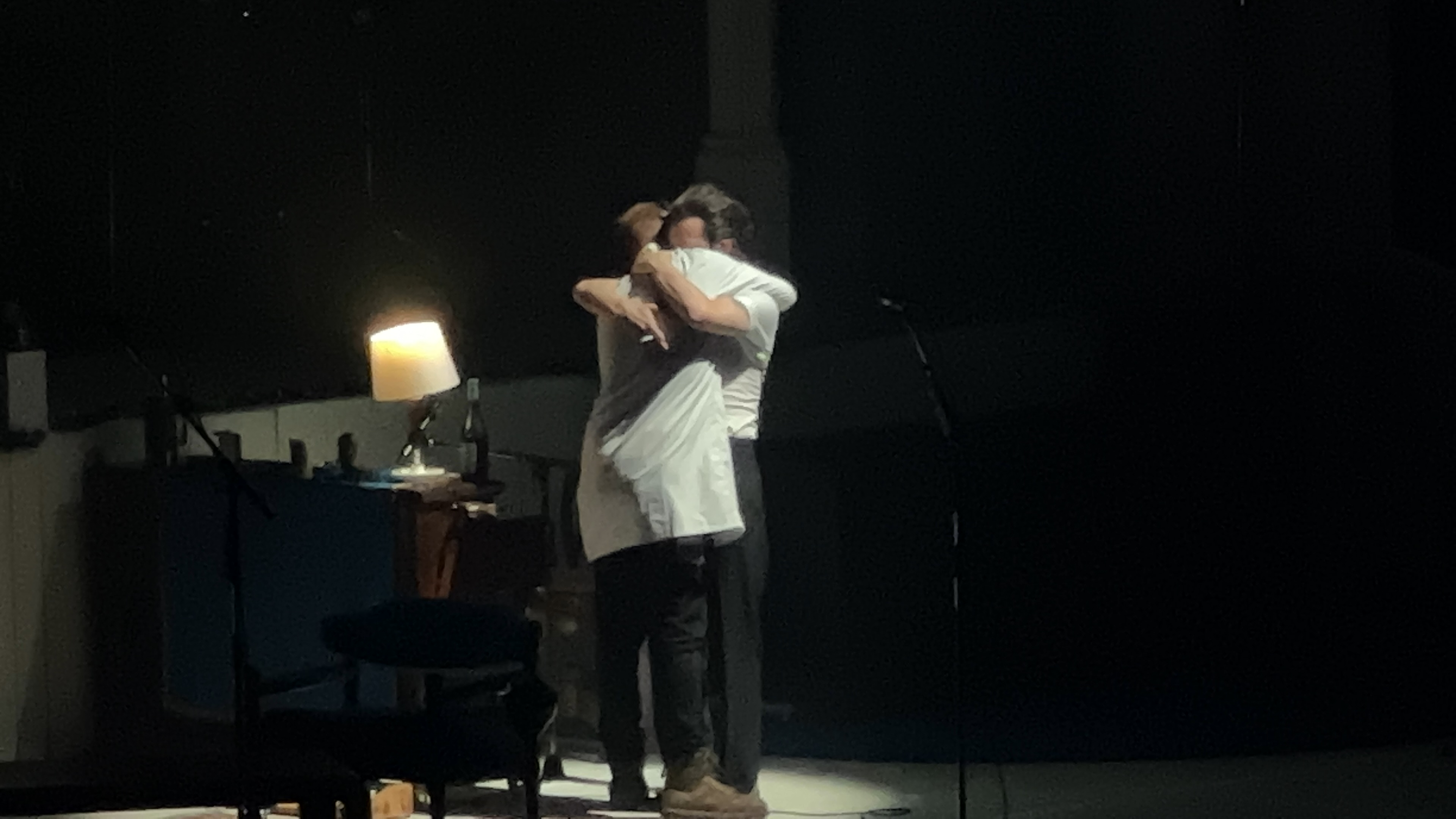

== Tour dates ==
List of concerts, showing date, city, country, venue, and opening act
| Date | City | Country | Venue | Opening acts |
Leg 1 – North America
| 3 November 2022 | Uncasville | United States | Mohegan Sun Arena | Blackstarkids |
| 4 November 2022 | Boston | United States | MGM Music Hall at Fenway | Blackstarkids |
| 5 November 2022 | Boston | United States | MGM Music Hall at Fenway | Blackstarkids |
| 7 November 2022 (Note: Live streamed on Twitch presented by Amazon Music, with recording released on Amazon Prime Video on 6 January 2023.) | New York City | United States | Madison Square Garden | Blackstarkids |
| 9 November 2022 | Camden | United States | Freedom Mortgage Pavilion | Blackstarkids |
| 10 November 2022 | Washington, D.C. | United States | The Anthem | Blackstarkids |
| 12 November 2022 | Atlanta | United States | State Farm Arena | Blackstarkids |
| 13 November 2022 | Nashville | United States | Municipal Auditorium | Blackstarkids |
| 15 November 2022 | Grand Prairie | United States | Texas Trust CU Theatre | Blackstarkids |
| 16 November 2022 | Houston | United States | 713 Music Hall | Blackstarkids |
| 17 November 2022 | Austin | United States | Moody Center | Blackstarkids |
| 20 November 2022 (Note: Part of Corona Capital) | Mexico City | Mexico | Autódromo Hermanos Rodríguez | —N/a |
| 23 November 2022 | Phoenix | United States | Arizona Financial Theatre | Blackstarkids |
| 25 November 2022 | Paradise (Note: Promoted as Las Vegas) | United States | The Theater at Virgin Hotels | Blackstarkids |
| 26 November 2022 | San Diego | United States | CalCoast Credit Union Open Air Theatre | Blackstarkids |
| 28 November 2022 | Inglewood | United States | Kia Forum | Blackstarkids |
| 29 November 2022 | San Francisco | United States | Bill Graham Civic Auditorium | Blackstarkids |
| 1 December 2022 | Portland | United States | Moda Center | Blackstarkids |
| 2 December 2022 | Seattle | United States | WaMu Theater | Blackstarkids |
| 4 December 2022 (Note: Part of the Audacy Beach Festival) | Fort Lauderdale | United States | Fort Lauderdale Beach | —N/a |
| 6 December 2022 | Denver | United States | Mission Ballroom | —N/a |
| 8 December 2022 | Independence | United States | Cable Dahmer Arena | Blackstarkids |
| 9 December 2022 | Chicago | United States | Byline Bank Aragon Ballroom | Blackstarkids |
| 10 December 2022 | Milwaukee | United States | The Eagles Ballroom | Blackstarkids |
| 12 December 2022 | Toronto | Canada | Scotiabank Arena | Blackstarkids |
| 14 December 2022 | Minneapolis | United States | Armory | Blackstarkids |
| 16 December 2022 | Newport | United States | MegaCorp Pavilion | Blackstarkids |
| 17 December 2022 | Moon Township (Note: Promoted as Pittsburgh) | United States | UPMC Events Center | Blackstarkids |
Leg 2 – Europe
| 8 January 2023 | Brighton | England | Brighton Centre | Bonnie Kemplay |
| 9 January 2023 | Bournemouth | England | Bournemouth International Centre | Bonnie Kemplay |
| 10 January 2023 | Exeter | England | Westpoint Arena | Bonnie Kemplay |
| 12 January 2023 | London | England | The O_{2} Arena | Bonnie Kemplay |
| 13 January 2023 | London | England | The O_{2} Arena | Bonnie Kemplay |
| 15 January 2023 | Birmingham | England | Resorts World Arena | Bonnie Kemplay |
| 16 January 2023 | Cardiff | Wales | Cardiff International Arena | Bonnie Kemplay |
| 17 January 2023 | Cardiff | Wales | Cardiff International Arena | Bonnie Kemplay |
| 19 January 2023 | Glasgow | Scotland | OVO Hydro | Bonnie Kemplay |
| 20 January 2023 | Manchester | England | AO Arena | Bonnie Kemplay |
| 22 January 2023 | Nottingham | England | Motorpoint Arena | Bonnie Kemplay |
| 23 January 2023 | Leeds | England | First Direct Arena | Bonnie Kemplay |
| 25 January 2023 | Newcastle | England | Utilita Arena | Bonnie Kemplay |
| 26 January 2023 | Liverpool | England | M&S Bank Arena | Bonnie Kemplay |
| 29 January 2023 | Dublin | Ireland | 3Arena | Bonnie Kemplay |
| 30 January 2023 | Belfast | Ireland | SSE Arena | Bonnie Kemplay |
Leg 3 – Latin America
| 18 March 2023 (Note: Part of Lollapalooza) | San Isidro (Note: Promoted as Buenos Aires) | Argentina | Hipódromo de San Isidro | —N/a |
| 19 March 2023 | Santiago | Chile | O'Higgins Park | —N/a |
| 21 March 2023 (Note: Part of Asunciónico) | Luque (Note: Promoted as Asunción) | Paraguay | Parque Olímpico | —N/a |
| 23 March 2023 (Note: Part of Festival Estéreo Picnic) | Sopó (Note: Promoted as Bogotá) | Colombia | Campo de Golf Briceño | —N/a |
| 25 March 2023 | São Paulo | Brazil | Autódromo de Interlagos | —N/a |
| 29 March 2023 | Guadalajara | Mexico | Arena VFG | —N/a |
| 30 March 2023 | Mexico City | Mexico | Palacio de los Deportes | —N/a |
| 1 April 2023 (Note: Part of Tecate Pa'l Norte) | Monterrey | Mexico | Fundidora Park | —N/a |
Leg 4 – Asia-Pacific
| 4 April 2023 | Pak Kret (Note: Promoted as Bangkok) | Thailand | IMPACT Arena | Wallice |
| 8 April 2023 | Perth | Australia | Red Hill Auditorium | Wallice |
| 10 April 2023 | Adelaide | Australia | AEC Theatre | Wallice |
| 11 April 2023 | Melbourne | Australia | Rod Laver Arena | Wallice |
| 12 April 2023 | Melbourne | Australia | Rod Laver Arena | Wallice |
| 14 April 2023 | Sydney | Australia | Aware Super Theatre | Wallice |
| 15 April 2023 | Brisbane | Australia | Riverstage | Wallice |
| 16 April 2023 | Sydney | Australia | Qudos Bank Arena | Wallice |
| 19 April 2023 | Wellington | New Zealand | TSB Bank Arena | Wallice |
| 21 April 2023 | Auckland | New Zealand | Spark Arena | Wallice |
| 24 April 2023 | Tokyo | Japan | Tokyo Garden Theater | —N/a |
| 26 April 2023 | Yokohama | Japan | Pia Arena MM | —N/a |
| 27 April 2023 | Yokohama | Japan | Pia Arena MM | —N/a |
| 29 April 2023 | Nagoya | Japan | Aichi Sky Expo | —N/a |
| 30 April 2023 | Osaka | Japan | Osaka-jō Hall | —N/a |
| 3 May 2023 | Pasay (Note: Promoted as Manila) | Philippines | SM Mall of Asia Arena | —N/a |
| 4 May 2023 | Pasay | Philippines | SM Mall of Asia Arena | —N/a |
Leg 5 – Europe
| 27 May 2023 (Note: Part of BBC Radio 1's Big Weekend) | Dundee | Scotland | Camperdown Park | —N/a |
| 2 June 2023 (Note: Part of NorthSide Festival) | Aarhus | Denmark | Eskelunden | —N/a |
| 3 June 2023 (Note: Part of Orange Warsaw Festival) | Warsaw | Poland | Tor Wyścigów Konnych Służewiec | —N/a |
| 5 June 2023 (Note: The Vienna show was originally scheduled to be held at the Bank Austria Halle but relocated to Wiener Stadthalle due to high demand.) | Vienna | Austria | Wiener Stadthalle | —N/a |
| 7 June 2023 | Dublin | Ireland | Saint Anne's Park | Matty Healy (Note: The band's own frontman, Matty Healy, opened the concert with an acoustic set due to original opener Caroline Polachek being sick.) |
| 9 June 2023 (Note: Part of Best Kept Secret) | Hilvarenbeek | Netherlands | Beekse Bergen | —N/a |
| 10 June 2023 (Note: Part of Rock for People) | Hradec Králové | Czech Republic | Festivalpark | —N/a |
| 11 June 2023 (Note: Part of Parklife) | Manchester | England | Heaton Park | —N/a |
| 13 June 2023 | Cork | Ireland | Musgrave Park | Caroline Polachek |
| 15 June 2023 (Note: Part of Piknik i Parken) | Oslo | Norway | Sofienberg Park | —N/a |
| 16 June 2023 (Note: Part of Southside Festival) | Neuhausen ob Eck | Germany | Take-off Gewerbepark | —N/a |
| 18 June 2023 (Note: Part of Hurricane Festival) | Scheeßel | Germany | Eichenring | —N/a |
| 23 June 2023 (Note: Part of City Sounds Festival) | Luxembourg | | Champ du Glacis | —N/a |
| 26 June 2023 (Note: The Bucharest show was originally scheduled to be held at Arenele Romane but relocated to Romexpo due to high demand.) | Bucharest | Romania | Romexpo | —N/a |
| 29 June 2023 (Note: Part of Rock Werchter) | Werchter | Belgium | Festivalpark | —N/a |
| 1 July 2023 | Stockholm | Sweden | Gärdet | —N/a |
| 2 July 2023 | London | England | Finsbury Park | Cigarettes After Sex; Bleachers; The Japanese House; American Football; Pretty Sick; The Life |
| 6 July 2023 (Note: Part of Mad Cool) | Madrid | Spain | Villaverde | —N/a |
| 9 July 2023 (Note: Part of TRNSMT) | Glasgow | Scotland | Glasgow Green | —N/a |
| 12 July 2023 | Paris | France | L'Olympia | —N/a |
| 14 July 2023 (Note: Part of Super Bock Super Rock) | Lisbon | Portugal | Praia do Meco | —N/a |
Leg 6 – Asia
| 18 July 2023 | Singapore | | Sands Expo & Convention Centre | —N/a |
| 19 July 2023 | Singapore | | Sands Expo & Convention Centre | —N/a |
| 21 July 2023 (Note: Part of Good Vibes Festival.) (Note: Performance forced to end prematurely after Healy kissed a male band member onstage and criticised the Malaysian government over its LGBTQ+ policies. The entire three-day festival was also subsequently cancelled.) | Sepang (Note: Promoted as Kuala Lumpur) | Malaysia | Sepang International Circuit | —N/a |
Leg 7 – North America
| 4 August 2023 | Chicago | United States | Grant Park | —N/a |
| 6 August 2023 | Honolulu | United States | Waikiki Shell | —N/a |
| 13 August 2023 (Note: Part of Outside Lands Music and Arts Festival) | San Francisco | United States | Golden Gate Park | —N/a |

== Cancelled shows ==
List of cancelled concerts, showing date, city, country, venue, and reason for cancellation
| Date | City | Country | Venue | Reason |
|---|---|---|---|---|
| 23 July 2023 (Note: Part of We the Fest) | Jakarta | Indonesia | Gelora Bung Karno Sports Complex | Controversy following the 2023 The 1975 Malaysia performance. |
| 25 July 2023 | Taipei | Taiwan | Taipei Music Center | Controversy following the 2023 The 1975 Malaysia performance. |

== Selected box office score data ==
List of concerts, showing venue, city, tickets sold, number of available tickets and amount of gross revenue
| Venue | City | Attendance | Revenue |
|---|---|---|---|
| Madison Square Garden | New York City | 12,947 / 12,947 | $1,051,011 |
| Freedom Mortgage Pavilion | Camden | 7,336 / 7,336 | $424,180 |
| The Anthem | Washington, D.C. | 6,000 / 6,000 | $475,825 |
| Nashville Municipal Auditorium | Nashville | 7,038 / 7,038 | $414,703 |
| Moody Center | Austin | 8,828 / 8,828 | $476,218 |
| Arizona Financial Theatre | Phoenix | 5,214 / 5,214 | $307,245 |
| Kia Forum | Inglewood | 13,955 / 13,955 | $1,004,480 |
| Bill Graham Civic Auditorium | San Francisco | 8,622 / 8,622 | $619,644 |
| Moda Center | Portland | 7,959 / 7,959 | $421,944 |
| Scotiabank Arena | Toronto | 14,257 / 14,257 | $1,013,943 |
| Total | | 92,156 / 92,156 | $6,209,193 |
