= Wallice =

American indie pop singer-songwriter

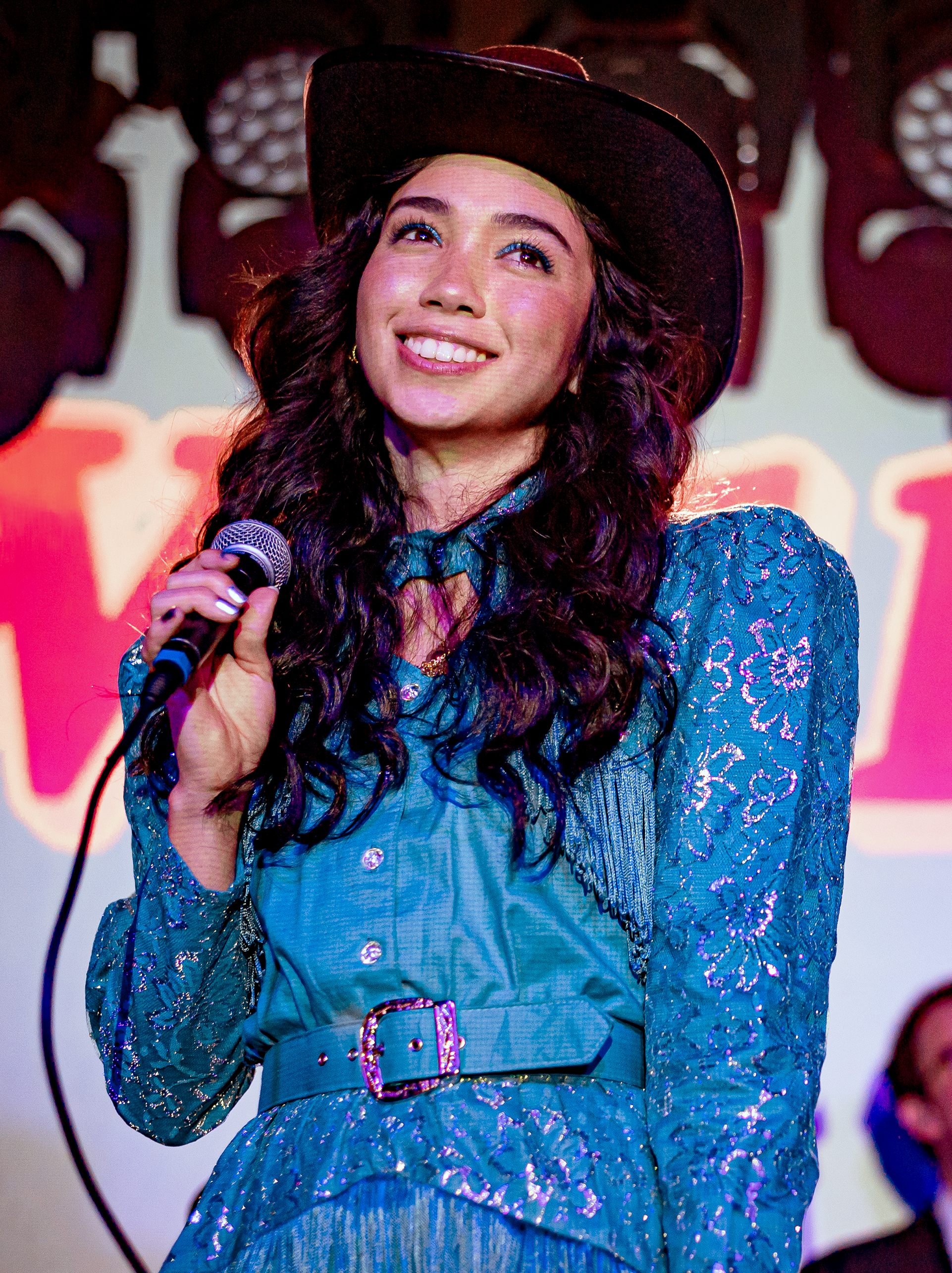
- Wallice performing in 2021

Background information
- Born: Wallice Hana Watanabe; April 3, 1998 (age 28); Los Angeles, California
- Origin: Topanga, California
- Genres: Indie pop; indie rock; alternative rock; bedroom pop
- Occupation: Singer-songwriter
- Instruments: Vocals; guitar
- Years active: 2017–present
- Label: Dirty Hit

Wallice Hana Watanabe, known mononymously as Wallice, is an American singer-songwriter and former child actress. She is based in Los Angeles, which is where she was born and raised.

== Early life ==
Wallice was born and raised in the Los Angeles area. She is half Japanese, and named after Wallis Simpson. She appeared in the Frasier Christmas special "We Two Kings" at age 4. She attended The New School in New York City, majoring in jazz performance and voice before dropping out to pursue music as a full-time career, which she references in her song "23". She and her producer Marinelli had been friends before he became her producer.

== Career ==
Wallice performing in 2026

Wallice released her first song "Nyc" in 2017, followed by "Rx" on January 17, 2018;, before releasing her debut EP "Big Sugar" on September 13, 2018. The EP has since been delisted from all streaming platforms. She signed with Dirty Hit in 2021. Wallice opened for Chloe Moriondo in 2021, and played at the Moroccan Lounge in Los Angeles on December 7, 2021. Watanabe played at the All Things Go Festival in 2022

and supported The 1975 on their Manila & Australian tour in April 2023.

Her song "Punching Bag" was included in Spotify's "Lorem" playlist, which helped the song reach a wide audience on the platform. "Punching Bag" received four million streams increasing Wallice's popularity. Aside from being on Spotify's playlist, Wallice was also selected to be part of the Spotify Fresh Finds marketing program. As part of the program, Wallice collaborated with David Marinelli and Ariel Rechtshaid to create "Nothing Scares Me", released exclusively to Spotify June 23, 2021. The recording of the song "Punching Bag" took place in Marinelli's bedroom. She released her debut studio album, The Jester, in 2024. In October 2025, she stated in a post to her Instagram story that Dirty Hit had dropped her from the record label, citing (implied) underperformance of the debut album.

== Artistry ==
Wallice cites Weezer and MGMT as her two biggest influences.

== Discography ==
Albums

- The Jester (2024)

=== EPs ===
- Off the Rails (2021)
- 90s American Superstar (2022)
- Mr. Big Shot (2023)

=== Singles ===
- Punching Bag (2020)
- Hey Michael (2021)
- Off the Rails (2021)
- Wisdom Tooth (2021)
- Little League (2022)
- Funeral (2022)
- 90s American Superstar (2022)
- Japan (2022)
- Best Friend (2023)
- Loser at Best (2023)
- disappear (2023)
- Heaven Has To Happen (2024)
- The Opener (2024)
- Gut Punch Love (2024)
- I Want You Yesterday (2024)

== Tour ==
=== Opening ===
- At Their Very Best (2022)
- All Born Screaming (April 2025)
