= Blackstarkids =

American band

BLACKSTARKIDS
- Origin: Kansas City, Missouri
- Genres: Hip-hop; pop; indie pop; indie rock; alternative rock
- Years active: 2019–present
- Labels: Dirty Hit
- Members: Ty Faizon; Deiondre; TheBabeGabe

Blackstarkids, sometimes stylised as BLACKSTARKIDS, are an American hip-hop/indie rock/pop band from Kansas City, Missouri. The band consists of The Babe Gabe, TyFaizon, and Deiondre. Blackstarkids blend the music styles of hip-hop, indie rock and pop and have been described as "1990s nostalgia reinterpreted for a new generation."

== History ==
The Blackstarkids members met at the age of fifteen or sixteen in Raytown, a suburb just outside Kansas City, where they grew up and attended high school. TyFaizon had been working separately with The Babe Gabe and Deiondre on different projects, subsequently bringing the three together to form the Blackstarkids in January 2019.

The members do not have a specific role, but TyFaizon and The Babe Gabe are often credited as the main songwriters with Deiondre acting as the main producer. They create their works by deciding on an album name and tracklist using a "visual concept", then write songs to fit the concept. The group often uses existing songs as references or inspiration, such as the riff to Green Day's "Basket Case" leading to their riff-based song "Frankie Muniz".

They formed their own label, Bedroom Records, releasing their debut mixtape Let's Play Sports in 2019 and their follow-up SURF in 2020. They signed to Matty Healy of The 1975's label Dirty Hit in April 2020, shortly after he highlighted their track "Sounds Like Fun" as one of his new discoveries on Instagram. Their first mix-tape for Dirty Hit titled Whatever, Man was released in late 2020 and featured a cameo from Matty Healy and label mates beabadoobee on the track "Friendship". The album featured the track "Frankie Muniz" which gained praise on Twitter from the actor with the same name. They released their album Puppies Forever in October 2021. Although it is their fourth release, the group considers it their proper debut album. The album was preceded by three singles, "Juno", "Fight Club," and "All Cops Are Bastards", which demonstrated anger at systemic racism and police brutality.

Due to the COVID-19 pandemic, live performances were limited to a handful of shows, including appearing at Chicago's Riot Fest alongside Devo, Ice-T and The Flaming Lips in September 2021, touring with label mates Glass Animals and beabadoobee in fall 2021.

=== Influences ===
The group's influences are wide-ranging and include indie rock groups such as Weezer, Nirvana, and The Smashing Pumpkins; hip hop acts such as A Tribe Called Quest, Tyler the Creator, Odd Future; and other acts such as Prince, Mac DeMarco and Toro Y Moi. Blackstarkids also incorporate influences from 2000s pop culture such as Scott Pilgrim vs. the World, Diary of a Wimpy Kid, and iCarly amongst others.

== Discography ==
Studio Albums

- Puppies Forever (Dirty Hit, 2021)
- Saturn Dayz (Dirty Hit, 2024)

Mixtapes

- Let's Play Sports (Bedroom Records, 2019)
- SURF (Bedroom Records, 2020)
- Whatever, Man (Dirty Hit, 2020)
- CYBERKISS* (Dirty Hit, 2022)

== Tours ==
=== As an Opening Band ===
- The 1975 - At Their Very Best (2022)
