= Good Vibes Festival =

Annual music festival in Malaysia

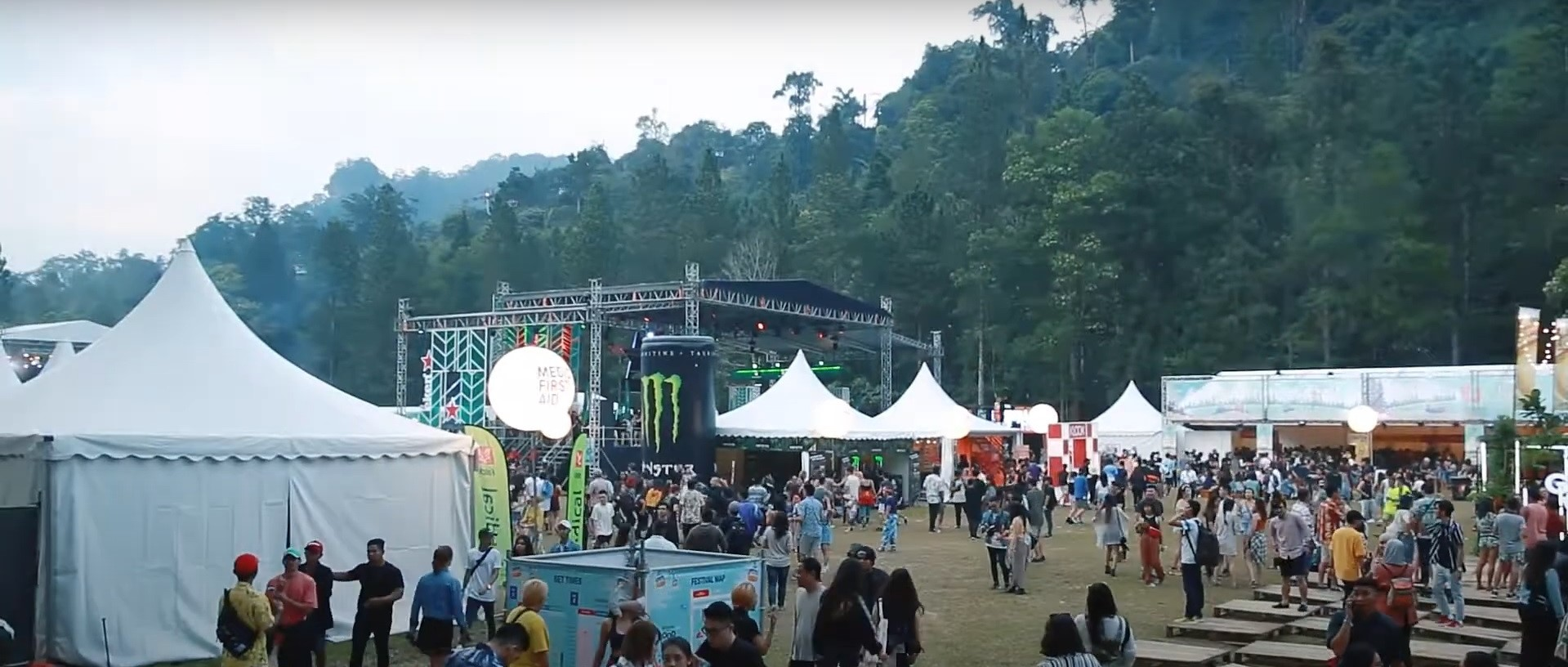
- The festival site in 2018
- Genre: Music festival
- Frequency: Annually
- Locations: Sepang International Circuit, Selangor; Genting Highlands, Pahang (2016–2019); Sunway Lagoon, Selangor (2022)
- Years active: 2013–present
- Inaugurated: 13 August 2013; 13 years ago
- Most recent: 21 July 2023
- Organiser: Future Sound Asia Sdn. Bhd.
- Website: www.goodvibesfestival.com

Good Vibes Festival (GVF) is an annual music festival held in Malaysia. Organized by Future Sound Asia, the first edition was held on August 13, 2013, later held over two days from 2016.

== History ==
=== 2010s ===
Good Vibes Festival was first organized as a multi-artist concert on 13 August 2013 at the Sepang International Circuit, with a line-up of acts like The Smashing Pumpkins and Modest Mouse. In 2014, the festival was extended as a two-day event, with Ellie Goulding and Empire of the Sun as the main act. The festival did not take place in 2015, and starting in 2016 and the subsequent edition, GVF was held in Genting Highlands.

=== 2020s ===
GVF was not held in 2020 and 2021 due to COVID-19 pandemic. The festival returned in September 2022 and took place in Sunway Lagoon under the name Good Vibes Weekender, featuring Korean rapper CL and Hong Kong singer Jackson Wang as the main acts.

The festival's 2023 edition marked the 10th anniversary since the first edition and return to the festival's early edition venue, the Sepang International Circuit, first edition with three-day event, featuring lineup of acts: The 1975, The Kid Laroi and The Strokes, alongside other artists. The also gained attention due to the increase in ticket prices to become the most expensive in the history of the organization. The 1975's frontman Matt Healy as well as the rest of the band were banned from Malaysia and forced by the authorities to prematurely end their performance at the festival after he criticised the country's widespread anti-LGBTQ+ laws and kissed bandmate Ross MacDonald. Healy stated that the band's decision to appear in Malaysia had been a "mistake". "When we were booking shows, I wasn't looking into it. [...] So I pulled the show yesterday and we had a conversation, we said 'you know what, we can't let the kids down because they're not the problem'". The organisers subsequently cancelled the rest of the three-day festival, on government orders, citing that Healy's "controversial conduct and remarks" are "against the traditions and values of the local culture". Human rights and LGBT activist Peter Tatchell, writing for The Guardian wrote that criticism of Healy and the band "deflect attention from where the criticisms should be most urgently directed: against the homophobia of the Kuala Lumpur regime." He also expressed that Healy is no white saviour for showing solidarity to the community as "queer rights are a universal human right, not a western one". Reactions to the incident from Malaysians on social media were generally critical of Healy. Some members of the LGBT community in Malaysia were frustrated by the incident and expressed concern it would lead to further reprisals from the religious right.

The 2024 edition was cancelled due to the Installation of Yang di-Pertuan Agong XVII.

== Lineup ==
Edition	Year	Date	Venue	Act lineups
1	2013	13 August 2013	Sepang International Circuit, Selangor	The Smashing Pumpkins · Modest Mouse
2	2014	23 August 2014	Sepang International Circuit, Selangor	Ellie Goulding · The Smashing Pumpkins · Empire of the Sun
3	2016	12–13 August 2016	Genting Highlands, Pahang	The 1975 · Disclosure · Two Door Cinema Club
4	2017	12–13 August 2017	Genting Highlands, Pahang	Phoenix · G-Eazy · Kodaline · The Kooks
5	2018	21–22 July 2018	Genting Highlands, Pahang	Lorde · SZA · Alt-J · Odesza
6	2019	20–21 July 2019	Genting Highlands, Pahang	Rae Sremmurd · Yuna
7 (Note: As the Good Vibes Weekender.)	2022	23–24 September 2022	Sunway Lagoon, Kuala Lumpur	CL · Jackson Wang
8	2023	21 July 2023 (Note: Originally scheduled for July 21 to 23, but was cancelled after the authorities interfered after the 1975’s frontman Matty Healy condemned the country’s anti-LGBTQ+ laws, and kissed his bandmate Ross MacDonald.)	Sepang International Circuit, Selangor	The 1975 · The Kid Laroi · The Strokes
9	2024	20 July–21 July 2024 (Note: It was originally scheduled for 20–21 July 2024 but was cancelled due to the Installation of Yang di-Pertuan Agong XVII clashing with the date.)	Cancelled	Cancelled
