= Sofienberg Park =

Park in Oslo, Norway

Coordinates: 59°55′22″N 10°45′51″E

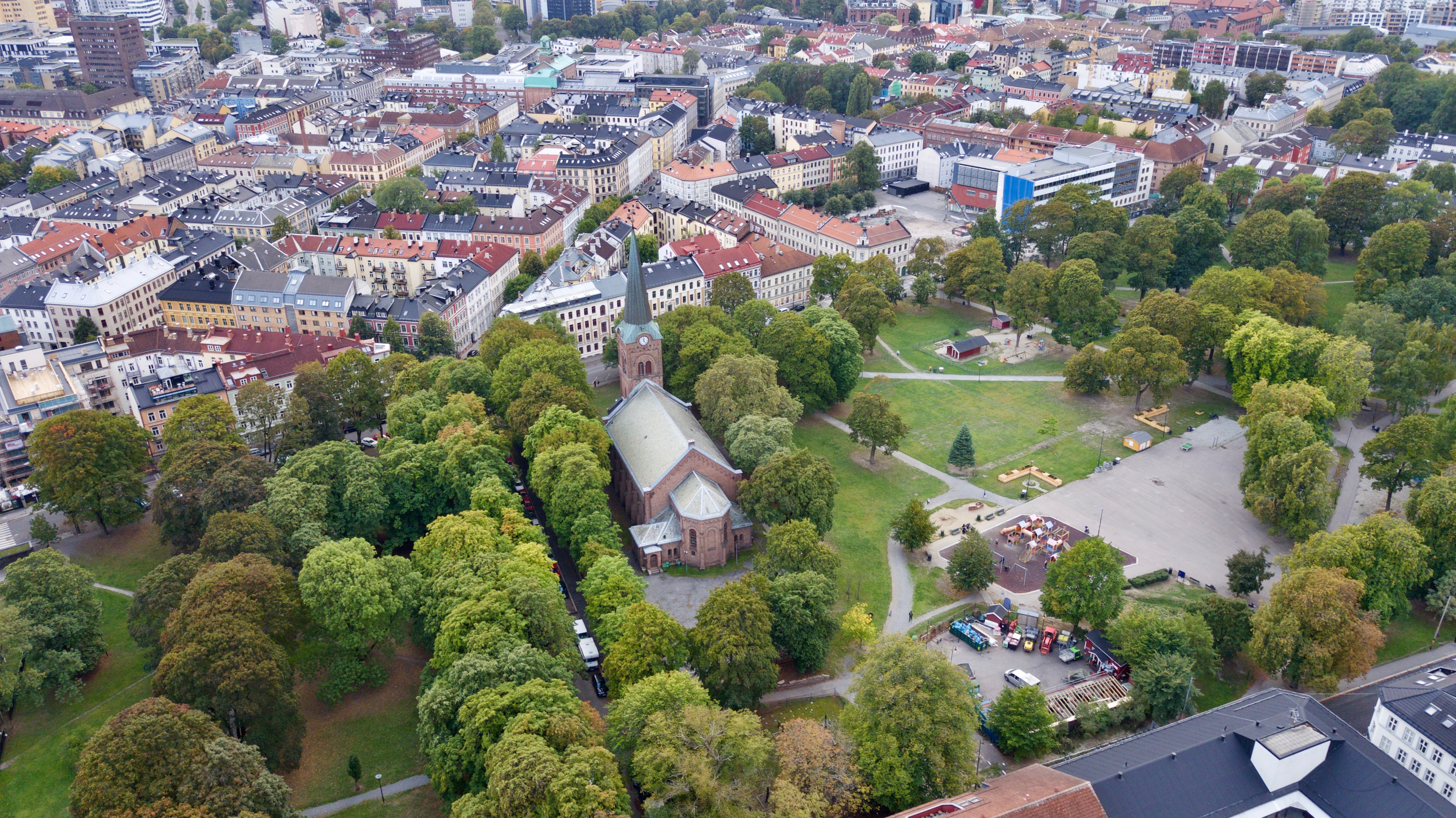
Sofienberg Park with Sofienberg Church

Sofienberg Park (Norwegian: Sofienbergparken) is a large park in the Grünerløkka district of Oslo, Norway, covering an area of 74 ha (180 acres).

== Name ==
The park takes its name from a country villa called Sofienberg which was located at the upper end of Nødre Dælenenga between Torshovbekken and Trondheimsveien. From 1799 to 1830 it was owned by Jacob Nielsen, an official, and then by the merchant Niels Rosenberg until 1857. Both had wives named Sophie. As the first of the two was Sophie Berg, the area certainly takes its name from her.

== History ==
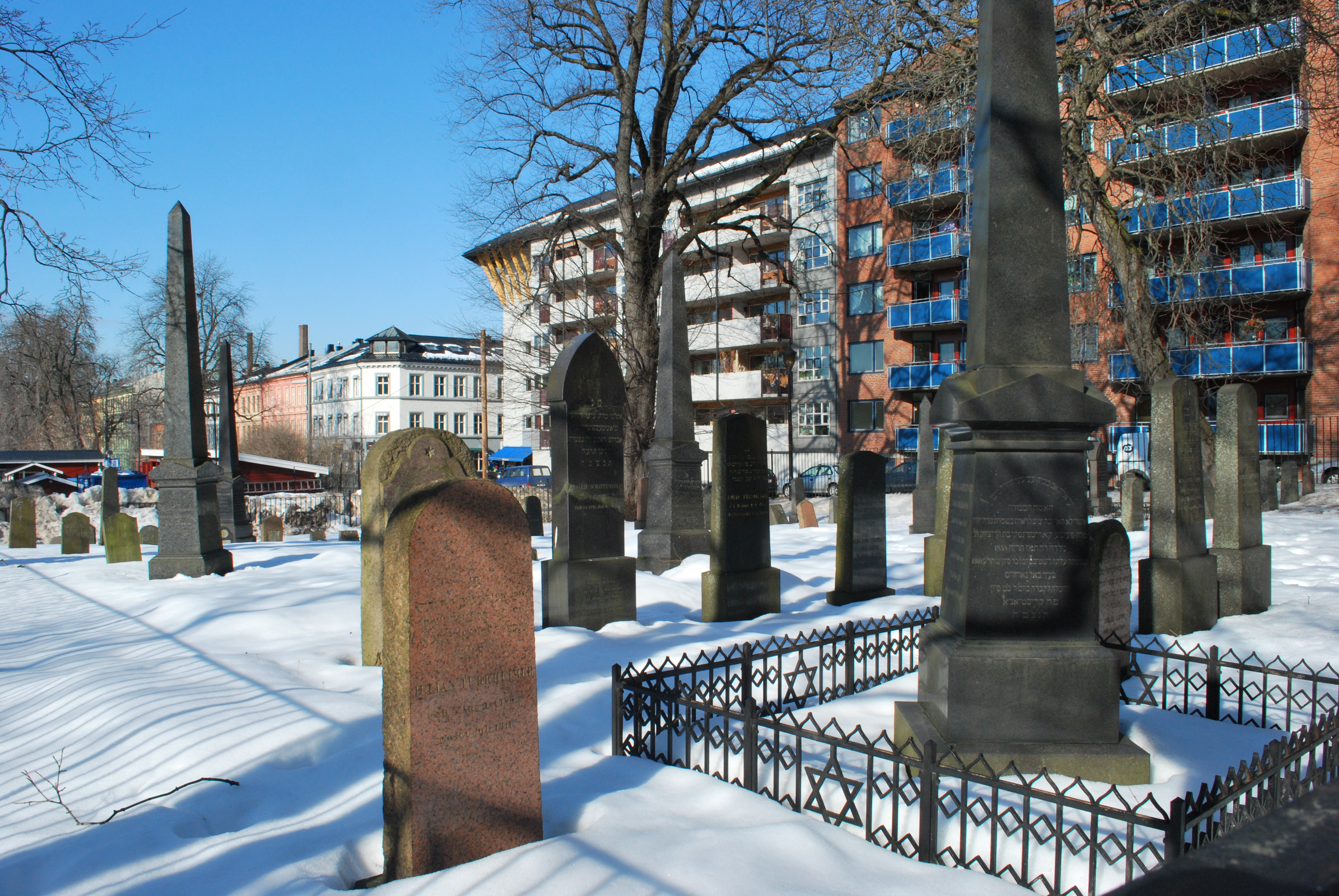
Jewish cemetery

Now one of Oslo's most popular parks, the area was first developed as a cemetery in 1858 when it was on the outskirts of the built-up area. But as the city grew, by the early 20th century the authorities considered it was inappropriate for a cemetery to occupy such a large area in the centre of the city. As a result, from 1918 to 1972, almost the entire area was converted into parkland. The first section of the park was opened in 1920 flanking Toftes Gate. While the gravestones were moved to other cemeteries around the city, one section which had never been used for burials was used for a children's playground in the 1930s. Thereafter the western and eastern sections were also cleared. The Jewish Cemetery, developed from 1858 to 1931, was however left intact. Over the years, some 60,000 citizens had been buried at Sofienberg Cemetery. Sofienberg Park is one of Oslo's most popular parks. As the houses and apartments in the surrounding area seldom have their own gardens, the inhabitants flock to the area, especially in the summer months often for a barbecue. The playground facilities continue to attract children. There are also public toilets and fireproof containers for throw-away grills.

== Sofienberg Church ==
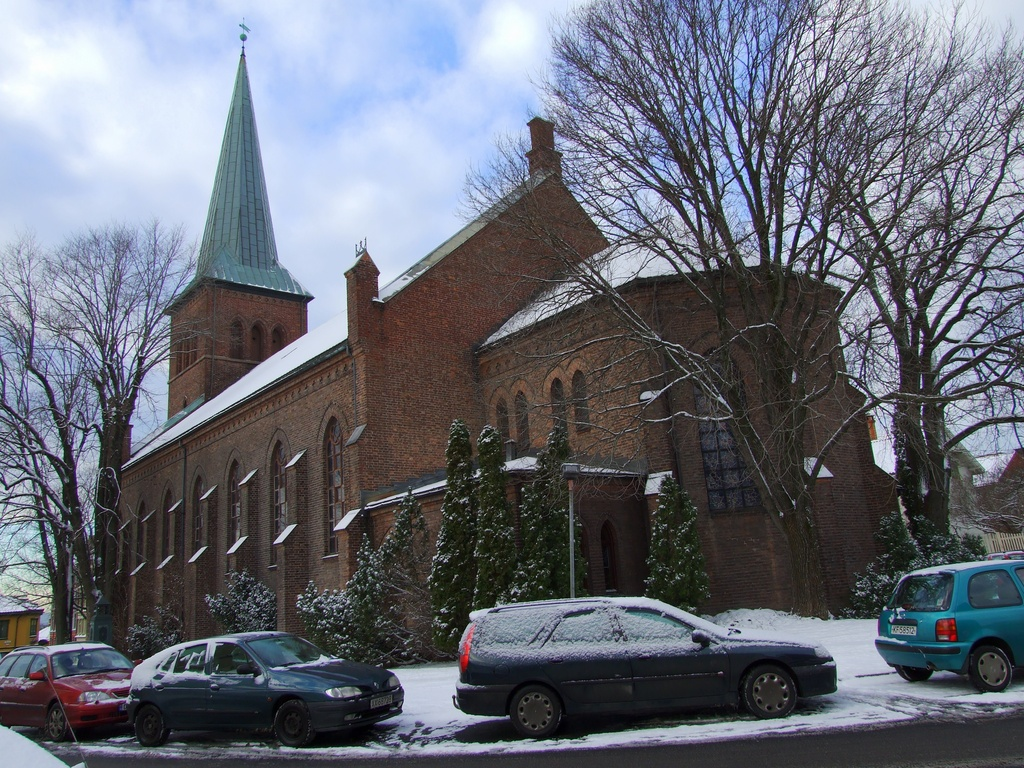
Sofienberg Church

Sofienberg Church which is located inside the park dates from 1877. It is designed by the Danish-born architect Jacob Wilhelm Nordan, and was first known as Paulus Kirke (St Paul's) but its name was changed to Petrus Kirke (St Peter's) in 1892 and finally to Sofienberg Kirke in 1962.
