= Pitchfork Music Festival Paris 2019 =

Music festival

- Dates: 31 October–2 November 2019
- Locations: Grande halle de la Villette, Paris, France
- Website: pitchforkmusicfestival.fr

The Pitchfork Music Festival Paris 2019 was held on 31 October to 2 November at the Grande halle de la Villette, Paris, France. It was headlined by rapper Skepta, pop rock band the 1975, indie pop band Belle and Sebastian, and electronic music band Chromatics.

Pitchfork teamed up with YARD to co-present the first day to focus on hip hop scene.

== Headlining set lists ==
Belle and Sebastian
1. "Dog on Wheels"
2. "Sister Buddha"
3. "Step into My Office, Baby"
4. "She's Losing It"
5. "If She Wants Me"
6. "I Want the World to Stop"
7. "The Stars of Track and Field"
8. "Like Dylan In the Movies"
9. "Stay Loose"
10. "Legal Man"
11. "The Party Line"

Encore

12. "Judy and the Dream of Horses"
13. "Le pastie de la bourgeoisie"
Chromatics
1. "Tick of the Clock"
2. "Lady"
3. "Kill for Love"
4. "Back from the Grave"
5. "I Can Never Be Myself When You're Around"
6. "Time Rider"
7. "These Streets Will Never Look the Same"
8. "I Want Your Love"
9. "Cherry"
10. "Hey Hey, My My (Into the Black)" (Neil Young cover)

Encore

11. "Black Walls"
12. "I'm on Fire" (Bruce Springsteen cover)
13. "Shadow"
14. "Running Up That Hill" (Kate Bush cover)
The 1975
1. "People"
2. "Give Yourself a Try"
3. "TooTimeTooTimeTooTime"
4. "She's American"
5. "Sincerity Is Scary"
6. "It's Not Living (If It's Not with You)"
7. "Robbers"
8. "I Like America & America Likes Me"
9. "Somebody Else"
10. "I Always Wanna Die (Sometimes)"
11. "Paris"
12. "Love It If We Made It"
13. "Chocolate"
14. "Sex"
15. "The Sound"

== Lineup ==
The full lineup was announced on 4 September 2019. Headline performers are listed in boldface. Artists listed from latest to earliest set times.

**Grande Halle**
Thursday, 31 October	Friday, 1 November	Saturday, 2 November
**Skepta**; Hamza; Mura Masa; Ezra Collective	**Belle and Sebastian**; **Chromatics**; Primal Scream; Desire	SebastiAn; **The 1975**; Charli XCX; Jamila Woods

**Nef**
Thursday, 31 October	Friday, 1 November	Saturday, 2 November
Zola; Ateyaba; Flohio; Slowthai; Kojaque	John Talabot; Weyes Blood; Nilüfer Yanya; Barrie	2ManyDj's; Agar Agar; Aurora; Caroline Polachek

**Petite Halle**
Thursday, 31 October	Friday, 1 November	Saturday, 2 November
AJ Tracey; Yussef Dayes; Retro X; Master Peace; sean	Chai; Sheer Mag; Squid; Sons of Raphael; Loving	Tobi Lou; KadhyaK; Aeris Roves; Mk.gee

**Studio**
Thursday, 31 October	Friday, 1 November	Saturday, 2 November
The Comet Is Coming; Kojey Radical; Rachel Chinouriri (Note: Celeste was supposed to perform, but cancelled. She was replaced by Rachel Chinouriri.); Charlotte Dos Santos; duendita	Helado Negro; Orville Peck; Jackie Mendoza; Nelson Beer; Briston Maroney	Kedr Livanskiy; Ela Minus; Oklou; BEA1991; Jessica Pratt; Korantemaa
