= I Always Wanna Die (Sometimes) =

2018 song by the 1975

Song by the 1975

from the album A Brief Inquiry into Online Relationships
- Released: 30 November 2018
- Genre: Britpop
- Length: 5:15
- Label: Dirty Hit; Polydor
- Songwriters: Matthew Healy; George Daniel; Adam Hann; Ross MacDonald
- Producers: Matthew Healy; George Daniel; Jonathan Gilmore

"I Always Wanna Die (Sometimes)" is a song by English band The 1975 from their third studio album, A Brief Inquiry into Online Relationships (2018). The song was written by band members Matty Healy, George Daniel, Adam Hann and Ross MacDonald. Daniel and Healy handled the production alongside Jonathan Gilmore. Healy began the songwriting process at his home using an acoustic guitar, while the production was built around the song's opening guitar riff. Influenced by Aerosmith's "I Don't Want to Miss a Thing", the band worked with David Campbell, who conducted the string arrangements.

"I Always Wanna Die (Sometimes)" is a Britpop power ballad with an electronic sound and experimental elements. The production comprises melancholic acoustic guitar strums, a cascading piano, shuffling drums, cinematic strings and elements of 1980s and 1990s adult contemporary rock. Lyrically, the song explores Healy's struggle with suicidal thoughts and details the desire for a different life and a return to the past. Thematically, the song reflects upon depression, isolation and loneliness.

Upon release, "I Always Wanna Die (Sometimes)" received generally positive reviews from contemporary music critics. Reviewers praised the production, lyrics and its placement on the album's tracklist, drawing numerous comparisons between the song and Oasis. It peaked at number 67 on the UK Singles Chart, number 16 in New Zealand, number 70 in Ireland and number 31 on the US Billboard Hot Rock & Alternative Songs chart.

== Background and development ==
"The idea of wanting to die has become a big meme now. Like that's the whole thing. The idea of death being a big mood [...] This whole thing is exhausting. Not only like the grand ideas of life, just the trudge of the day to day. It's fucking exhausting. And people can't even contemplate the idea of not existing."

— Healy, on the meaning behind "I Always Wanna Die (Sometimes)".

The 1975 released their second studio album I Like It When You Sleep, for You Are So Beautiful yet So Unaware of It in February 2016 to critical and commercial success. Domestically, it topped the UK Albums Chart and the Scottish Albums Chart. In the United States, the album peaked at number one on the US Billboard 200, Top Alternative Albums and Top Rock Albums charts. The album received positive reviews and is considered by various publications as one of the best albums of 2016. In April 2017, the band announced their third studio album would be titled Music For Cars, set for release in 2018. In April 2018, posters promoting Music For Cars began emerging around London and Manchester. However, in May, Healy announced that Music For Cars would now represent an "era" composed of two studio albums. The first, A Brief Inquiry into Online Relationships (2018), was released in November of the same year and includes "I Always Wanna Die (Sometimes)".

In an interview with Genius, Healy said that unlike most of the 1975's songs–which have "a lot more stylistic bigger kind of [songwriting] process"–he created "I Always Wanna Die (Sometimes)" at his home using an acoustic guitar. Regarding the song's conception, the singer called it "quite a humble thing". The production began after they developed the opening guitar riff, which Healy said was instantly recognised by the band as something "really good", and based the instrumentation around it. While the song originally had a more traditional Britpop sound, he wanted to incorporate his love of "big American rock music"–specifically from the late-1990s and early-2000s–into the composition. Looking to emulate production elements from the two eras, Healy decided to add a large string arrangement to give the song an uplifting and cinematic quality. Healy contacted David Campbell, his roommate's father and the track's conductor, and asked him to compose the string arrangements. Speaking to Sam Sodomsky of Pitchfork, the singer said he strove to develop "I Always Wanna Die (Sometimes)" as a midway point between the darkness of both the Verve's "Bitter Sweet Symphony" (1997) and the music of Oasis, while retaining the lyrics and vocals characteristic of Manchester. Ultimately, he was inspired to create a gritty, cinematic version of Aerosmith's "I Don't Want to Miss a Thing" (1998).

== Music and lyrics ==
"I Always Wanna Die (Sometimes)"
A 30-second sample of "I Always Wanna Die (Sometimes)", showcasing Healy's falsetto vocals and the song's heavy electronic sound, melancholic acoustic guitar strums, cinematic strings and crashing drum fills.

Musically, "I Always Wanna Die (Sometimes)" is an experimental Britpop power ballad that runs for a length of five minutes and 15 seconds (5:15). According to sheet music published at Musicnotes.com by Hal Leonard Music Publishing, "I Always Wanna Die (Sometimes)" is set in the time signature of common time with a slow tempo of 74 beats per minute. The track is composed in the key of E major, with Healy's vocals ranging between the notes of B_{2} and A_{4}. It follows a chord progression of E5–Emaj(no3)–E6(no3)–E5. The production of "I Always Wanna Die (Sometimes)" contains a heavy electronic sound, composed of keyboards, cellos, violas, violins, synths, melancholic acoustic guitar strums, a cascading piano, shuffling drums, crashing drum fills and waves of canned, cinematic strings. It continuously builds, ending with a key change that signals a "blissful" transition to a minute-long "restless dream" of cellos and strings. The title mixes irony and honesty, meant to represent someone whose suicidal thoughts often come and go.

Lyrically, "I Always Wanna Die (Sometimes)" details Healy's struggles with suicidal thoughts and offers honest reasons why suicide is not the answer. The song's narrative describes living through the mundane, longing for the past and wanting a different life. It eschews the singer's preceding sarcasm and reflects upon themes of depression, isolation and loneliness. In the verses, the singer ruminates on his mortality and struggles with the difficulty that his death would have on others: "But your death it won't happen to you / It happens to your family and your friends". Healy's vocals are delivered in a gentle, whispered tone but shift to a strong falsetto in the chorus–which incorporates backing strings and elements from 1980s and 1990s adult contemporary rock–as the singer repeats the titular phrase. In the second verse, he sings in an inspired tone and reflects upon defiance in facing adversity, singing: "You win, you lose, you sing the blues / There's no point in buying concrete shoes, I refuse". As the song reaches its conclusion, Healy delivers one final plea in the middle-eight: "If you can't survive, just try".

Kelsey Sullivan of Soundigest drew similarities to Oasis and wrote that the acoustic guitar and strings serve to highlight the fragility of the song's lyrics, comparing the latter instrument to the Verve's "Bitter Sweet Symphony", while saying it "would be easy to imagine this song used in a movie when a character is going through a difficult situation". Andrew Unterberger of Billboard said the song is evocative of a VH1 morning video block and the year 1998, calling it "the sound of Ethan Embry driving around while moping about his unrequited love for Jennifer Love Hewitt". He noted that unlike the 1975's "Give Yourself a Try" (2018), which contains searing guitars and a "choose-life" chorus, "I Always Wanna Die (Sometimes)" indulges the listener's depression while ultimately encouraging them to persevere and "fight [their] way back out". Cory McConnell of The Ringer said the song embraces "titanic [1990s] Britpop", comparing it to a mix between Radiohead's The Bends (1995) and Sigur Rós' music. Will Richards of DIY deemed "I Always Wanna Die (Sometimes)" a cacophonous, widescreen outcry, while Consequence of Sound writer David Sackllah compared the song to Oasis, calling it a "go-for-broke anthem" about suicidal thoughts.

== Reception ==
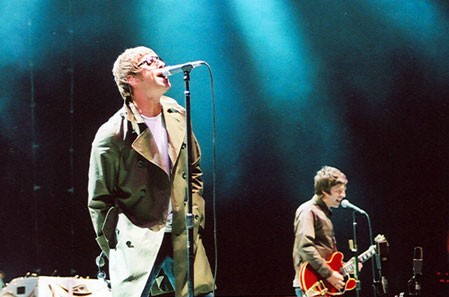
Several critics compared "I Always Wanna Die (Sometimes)" to the music of Oasis.

Upon release, "I Always Wanna Die (Sometimes)" was met with generally positive reviews from contemporary music critics and was heavily compared to Oasis, with one reviewer comparing it to "Champagne Supernova". Neil McCormick of The Daily Telegraph called the former a "dreamily epic" song. Ross Horton of musicOMH said "I Always Wanna Die (Sometimes)" is "so huge and atmospheric that it might have been made by Sigur Rós on a rainy day". Dan Stubbs of NME called the song "massive" and praised its personal and intense qualities, saying they "might just leave you in tears". Sackllah wrote that "I Always Wanna Die (Sometimes)" is "revealing, tragic and optimistic all at once". While deeming the track one of the album's three essential songs, he declared it a career highlight for the 1975 that reveals their true potential. Conrad Duncan of Under the Radar called the song a "festival-ready" anthem that "unbelievably justifies its ridiculous title". Unterberger called "I Always Wanna Die (Sometimes)" one of the most interesting and special songs on A Brief Inquiry into Online Relationships. He praised the band for exploring a period of gentle sorrow and subtle crisis, noting it would introduce new listeners to 1990s rock music while reflecting "what so many of their fans still feel like on a daily basis". Ryan Dombal of Pitchfork deemed the track "the most life-affirming 1975 song to date", saying its "fist-pump theatrics" are reminiscent of Oasis.

Tom Connick of NME said the couplet "But your death it won't happen to you / It happens to your family and your friends" is perhaps the most important line of 1975's career and said "I Always Wanna Die (Sometimes)" deserves to be heard by anyone struggling themselves. The publication also declared the track the sixth-best song of the band's career, with TC saying it showcases their grandeur and ambition. He praised Healy's honest reflection in the lyrics, and deemed the song a masterpiece and lost classic comparable to Radiohead's The Bends and the Verve's Urban Hymns (1997). Micah Peters of The Ringer said "I Always Wanna Die (Sometimes)" is an "extremely relatable death wish". Sputnikmusic staff writer SowingSeason praised the sincerity and romance of "I Always Wanna Die (Sometimes)". Joe Goggins of Drowned in Sound praised the song's placement on A Brief Inquiry into Online Relationships and its handling of mental health issues in the lyrics, saying Healy delivers an "admirably forthright reflection on depression".

Sullivan praised the placement of "I Always Wanna Die (Sometimes)" on the album and deemed it an emotional and honest masterpiece, calling the song soft, bleak, melodic and honest. Elaborating further, she said: "It is a beautiful, sad, and almost ominous way to end the album while capturing its essence." McConnell called the song a "jaw-dropping conclusion to an already bombastic album". He noted that while it is not as "sonically far removed" from I Like It When You Sleep, for You Are So Beautiful yet So Unaware of It compared to the 1975's "I Like America & America Likes Me" (2018) and "TooTimeTooTimeTooTime" (2018), the song's use of Britpop feels unexpected. Isaac Feldberg of The Boston Globe called "I Always Wanna Die (Sometimes)" a fitting end to the album, praising Healy's "gently devastating vocals". Claire Biddles of The Line of Best Fit said the song ends the album on a self-conscious, euphoric note. She commented that it functions as both a natural end-point and a high-concept track made for encores, calling the song a "final Britpop goodbye in the world's dying embers, because we all want to go out to the sound of something familiar".

Libby Cudmore of Paste gave "I Always Wanna Die (Sometimes)" a mixed review, calling the song a "slow bummer". While she praised it for mostly managing to achieve a balance that the majority of I Like It When You Sleep, for You Are So Beautiful yet So Unaware of It strives for and misses, she criticised the overproduced sound for creating a barrier between the listener and the singer. Chris Conaton of PopMatters felt the song is non-specific but praised Healy's falsetto and the string section's forward motion. Pryor Stroud of Slant Magazine gave "I Always Wanna Die (Sometimes)" a negative review, calling it the equivalent of a half-finished sketch, "without a memorable melody in sight". Commercially, "I Always Wanna Die (Sometimes)" performed modestly on international music charts. In the 1975's native United Kingdom, the song peaked at number 67 on the UK Singles Chart. Internationally, it reached number 70 in Ireland, number 16 in New Zealand and number 31 on the US Billboard Hot Rock & Alternative Songs chart.

== Credits and personnel ==
Credits adapted from A Brief Inquiry into Online Relationships album liner notes.

- Matthew Healy – composer, producer, acoustic guitar, guitar, vocals, background vocals
- George Daniel – composer, producer, drums, keyboards, synthesizer
- Adam Hann – composer, guitar
- Ross MacDonald – composer, bass guitar
- Jonathan Gilmore – producer, recording engineer
- David Campbell – conductor, string arranger, piano
- Derek Stein – cello
- Rudolph Stein – cello
- Luke Maurer – viola
- Thomas Lea – viola
- Mario de Leon – violin
- Michele Richards – violin
- Nina Evtuhov – violin
- Sara Parkins – violin
- Songa Lee – violin
- Travis Warner – recording engineer
- Robin Schmidt – mastering engineer
- Luke Gibbs – assistant recording engineer
- Nick Rives – assistant recording engineer
- Mike Crossey – mixer

== Charts ==
Chart performance for "I Always Wanna Die (Sometimes)"
Chart (2018–19)	Peak position
Ireland (IRMA)	70
New Zealand (Recorded Music NZ)	16
UK Singles (Official Charts)	67
US Hot Rock & Alternative Songs (Billboard)	31

== Certifications ==
Region	Certification	Certified units/sales
United Kingdom (BPI)	Silver	200,000^{‡}
^{‡} Sales+streaming figures based on certification alone.

== See also ==
- The 1975 discography
- List of songs by Matty Healy
