= I Like America and America Likes Me =

1974 performance by Joseph Beuys

- Artist: Joseph Beuys
- Year: 1974
- Medium: Artistic action (performance), documented via photograph and film

I Like America and America Likes Me (also known as Coyote) was an artistic action staged by German avant-garde artist Joseph Beuys in May 1974, during which he spent three consecutive days confined in a gallery enclosure with a live coyote.

== Artistic action ==
In May 1974, German avant-garde artist Joseph Beuys staged the action I Like America and America Likes Me (also known as Coyote) at the René Block Gallery on West Broadway in SoHo, New York City. Flying in from Germany to John F. Kennedy International Airport, he was immediately blindfolded and wrapped in felt, placed on a stretcher, and transported to the gallery by ambulance. Once there, Beuys spent three consecutive days, eight hours each day, sharing a partitioned enclosure with a live coyote named Little John. The action had been delayed by two days prior to allow for the installation of a steel mesh barrier, behind which spectators could observe the cohabitation.

Beuys brought a set of objects that structured a repeating cycle of interactions with the coyote: large pieces of felt, leather gloves, a flashlight, a wooden staff resembling a shepherd’s crook, a musical triangle, and a tape recording of a turbine engine to play over the gallery speakers. The gallery supplied a pile of straw and, each day, fifty copies of that day’s Wall Street Journal were delivered in two stacks of twenty-five.

Beuys performed these cycles approximately thirty times in total, each lasting over an hour and punctuated by a strike of the triangle that cued the turbine recording. Throughout, Little John was free to engage, ignore, or otherwise respond to the ritual as he chose.

Much of the three days passed in a state of coexistence. Stephen Aiken, a photographer who documented the action, recorded quieter stretches where the two occupied the space in parallel: looking out the gallery window together, or the coyote settling into felt while Beuys smoked. At other times, the dynamic shifted: Beuys drew the felt around himself, raised his staff, and performed repeated bows while Little John circled him growling. Aiken also noted moments of “secular comedy,” such as Beuys playing the triangle while the coyote urinated on copies of the Wall Street Journal — that week’s issues including reports on the federal pursuit of Patty Hearst and Nixon’s refusal to resign. These marked copies were eventually bound, signed, and sold.

On the final day, Beuys embraced the coyote before departing. He left the gallery as he had entered — blindfolded, wrapped in felt, on a stretcher — and was driven to the airport and returned to Germany.

=== Documentation ===
The action was documented through both photography and film. Caroline Tisdall, a former art critic for The Guardian and frequent collaborator of Beuys, captured the action in black-and-white photographs that were later exhibited at the De Marco Gallery in Edinburgh, Scotland. Stephen Aiken also photographed the action; his work was published fifty years later in the book An Artist, a Coyote, and a Cage: Joseph Beuys in New York 1974 by Letter16 Press in May 2024. The action was also recorded on 16mm black-and-white film with sound by Helmut Wietz, running just over 39 minutes, under the same title as the action itself.

== Symbolism ==
The felt in which Beuys wrapped himself during I Like America and America Likes Me was a therapeutic and shamanic symbol for Beuys through which he and his "social sculptures" (such as this performance) sought to heal societal psychic wounds

During this time, Beuys saw the United States as divided over its involvement in the Vietnam War and its racial divisions and subjugation, and wanted his performance to address the split between Native and European intelligence, the latter being more materialistic, mechanistic, and positivistic. His selection of the coyote, a Native American symbol of transformation and trickery, invoked its Native creation myth of the Promethean teacher teaching humans to survive. Whereas settlers viewed coyotes as an aggressive predator to be exterminated, to Beuys, the coyote symbolized America's spirit. Beuys felt that America needed to reckon with the coyote to lift its trauma.

The performance's title, I Like America and America Likes Me, also recalls the 7-Up soda advertising slogan, "You like it. It likes you." The piece is also known as Coyote.

The performance's lesson, wrote Artsy, is that American societal trauma can only be healed through direct communication.

Artsy wrote that the piece's title, evoking the melting pot metaphor for Americanization, stood in contrast with the divisions Beuys saw in America.

== Historical background ==
During World War II, Beuys served as a dive bomber pilot for the Luftwaffe. Following a mission, he crashed in Crimea, where a mythology developed concerning his rescue by nomadic Tartars: the crash resulted in serious head trauma and temporary blindness, and Beuys was reportedly treated by being “smeared with fat and blanketed with felt to preserve his body heat.” This experience fostered a lifelong attachment for him to those materials associated with his survival.

In the following years, Beuys maintained an opposition to the Vietnam War and refused to visit the United States while it was fighting in Vietnam. Throughout his lifetime, Beuys visited the U.S. only three times, including one trip to perform I Like America and America Likes Me.

== Reception and legacy ==
The action initially received limited reception, with few witnesses and minimal coverage from the art press in its immediate aftermath. Nevertheless, I Like America and America Likes Me is one of Beuys’s most widely recognized works.

Photographs of the action, taken by Caroline Tisdall, were shown at the Edinburgh Festival, where they greatly affected then-future-artist Jimmy Boyle. While curator RoseLee Goldberg found the photographs poetic, viewing a video of the action changed her perspective as she perceived sadness in the coyote. Additional photographs of the action, captured by Stephen Aiken, were published decades later in 2024 in the book An Artist, a Coyote, and a Cage: Joseph Beuys in New York 1974.

Five years after I Like America and America Likes Me, artifacts from the action were exhibited in a work titled Neues vom Coyoten (News from the Coyote), commemorating the disappearance of the René Block Gallery in West Berlin. This piece was shown as part of an exhibition at the Ronald Feldman Gallery and owned by the Dia Art Foundation in New York.

A song by The 1975, "I Like America & America Likes Me", appearing on their third studio album A Brief Inquiry into Online Relationships, is named after the action.
