= A Brief Inquiry into Online Relationships =

Studio album by The 1975
- Released: 30 November 2018
- Recorded: June 2017 – September 2018
- Studios: Waldenfeld House, London; Montague Court, London; Conway Sound, Los Angeles; Angelic, Halse; Abbey Road, London; Capitol, Los Angeles; Perfect Sound, Los Angeles; The Beach House, Santa Monica
- Genres: Experimental; electronic; rock; pop
- Length: 58:26
- Labels: Dirty Hit; Polydor
- Producers: Matthew Healy; George Daniel; Jonathan Gilmore

The 1975 chronology
I Like It When You Sleep, for You Are So Beautiful yet So Unaware of It (2016)	A Brief Inquiry into Online Relationships (2018)	Notes on a Conditional Form (2020)

Singles from A Brief Inquiry into Online Relationships
- 1. "Give Yourself a Try" Released: 31 May 2018; 2. "Love It If We Made It" Released: 19 July 2018; 3. "TooTimeTooTimeTooTime" Released: 15 August 2018; 4. "Sincerity Is Scary" Released: 13 September 2018; 5. "It's Not Living (If It's Not with You)" Released: 18 October 2018

A Brief Inquiry into Online Relationships is the third studio album by English band The 1975. It was released on 30 November 2018 by Dirty Hit and Polydor Records. Initially titled Music for Cars, the album was intended as the follow-up to I Like It When You Sleep, for You Are So Beautiful yet So Unaware of It (2016). The term later denoted an era encompassing both their third album and Notes on a Conditional Form, released in 2020. The band halted recording of the first part after lead singer Matthew Healy left for a drug rehabilitation clinic in Barbados, seeking treatment for his heroin addiction. Following the singer's return, the band spent several months completing the album in Northamptonshire and Los Angeles.

A maximalist experimental album, A Brief Inquiry into Online Relationships combines rock and pop music with ambient interludes. Eschewing the 1980s-influenced sound of its predecessor, the album embraces a desolate soundscape informed by electronica. Noted for its incorporation of various genres, the record heavily draws from jazz, R&B, electropop, indie rock and Britpop, among others. The songs are characterised by their electronic beats, gospel choirs, neo-soul horns and downtempo rhythms. Guest contributions are featured from the London Community Gospel Choir, No Rome, the Japanese House and Roy Hargrove.

Exploring the role of digital communication and the internet in contemporary life, A Brief Inquiry into Online Relationships is a concept album connected by several overarching threads. The album serves as a cautionary political statement, questioning the implications of society's relationship with technology and its impact on millennials. It marks a shift in Healy's portrayal of heroin addiction, embracing sincerity and honesty to speak on the desolation it causes. Eschewing metaphors and ambiguity, the album utilises black humour, simple lyrics and straightforward storytelling, covering dark topics such as nihilism, suicide, depression, anxiety, dissociation, trauma, cynicism and death, among others.

The album received widespread acclaim from contemporary music critics, who praised the production quality and portrayal of modern life, with some critics calling it a millennial version of Radiohead's OK Computer. It was preceded by the singles "Give Yourself a Try", "Love It If We Made It", "TooTimeTooTimeTooTime", "Sincerity Is Scary" and "It's Not Living (If It's Not with You)". In addition to appearing on numerous publications' year-end and decade-end lists, it won the British Album of the Year at the 2019 Brit Awards. The album became The 1975's third consecutive number one on the UK Albums Chart, and was later certified gold by the British Phonographic Industry (BPI). It also peaked at number four on the US Billboard 200 chart and attained top-ten positions in several countries, including on Ireland, New Zealand and Australia. To further promote the album, the band embarked on their Music for Cars Tour.

== Background ==
The 1975 released their second studio album, I Like It When You Sleep, for You Are So Beautiful yet So Unaware of It, in February 2016. The record peaked atop the UK Albums Chart and the US Billboard 200 and was considered by numerous critics to be one of the best albums of 2016. In February 2017, lead singer Matthew Healy tweeted: "Music For Cars – 2018". In an April interview on Zane Lowe's Beats 1 Radio show, the singer confirmed the title Music For Cars and announced a 2018 release, saying "[the album] has always been called that, and we were always gonna do a trilogy of records". He later told Tom Connick of NME that the title was a reference to the band's third extended play of the same name (2013), saying it "was always my favorite title of everything we'd ever done". With Music For Cars, the singer aimed to create the most important pop album of the decade, hoping to achieve the same impact as Radiohead's OK Computer (1997) and the Smiths' The Queen Is Dead (1986).

In August 2017, The 1975 stated they were in the editing process of Music For Cars, having over two hours worth of material, while the band's manager Jamie Oborne said the first recording sessions for the album were planned for September. Posters promoting the album began emerging around London and Manchester in April 2018. In May, The 1975 announced that Music For Cars would now serve as an umbrella term to denote an "era" comprising two albums: A Brief Inquiry into Online Relationships and Notes on a Conditional Form (2020). The title of the former is taken from Gene McHugh's essay The Context of the Digital: A Brief Inquiry Into Online Relationships. While on a train in London, Healy spotted a passenger reading You Are Here: Art After the Internet by Omar Kholeif, in which the essay is included. Regarding the decision to release two separate bodies of work rather than a double album, Healy called the double album format "prog and annoying ... they're self-serving".

== Recording and development ==
In July 2017, The 1975's drummer and co-producer George Daniel discovered Healy was using heroin again, only hours before performing at the Latitude Festival. The band held an intervention afterward, and the singer promised to detox once they traveled to Los Angeles to record A Brief Inquiry into Online Relationships. The initial recording sessions began in August at the Angelic Residential Recording Studio in Northamptonshire. In September, the singer went on a tirade while under the influence of benzodiazepine, proclaiming he would continue to smoke heroin while telling the band members: "Listen, everyone has to get onboard because I'm the fucking main deal. If you want songs, we're just going to have to get on with it." Realising the seriousness of his actions, Healy declared his intention to enter a drug rehabilitation centre and treat his heroin addiction. The 1975 travelled to Los Angeles the following month, recording at the Sunset Marqui until Halloween, when Healy left to seek treatment at a rehab in Barbados.

"Surrounded by Heads and Bodies"
Angela, the subject of "Surrounded by Heads and Bodies", is a woman Healy met while in rehab in Barbados. The song's title refers to the opening line of Infinite Jest (1996) David Foster Wallace, which the singer read during his time there.

Healy spent seven weeks in Barbados between November and December, an experience that inspired several songs on A Brief Inquiry into Online Relationships; he used songwriting as a means of catharsis that allowed him to gain a sense of purpose and wellbeing. The singer wrote "Surrounded by Heads and Bodies" about Angela, a woman he met in rehab. Although the pair rarely interacted, he felt a connection with her, and a later conversation revealed they lived on the same street in Manchester. The song's title stems from David Foster Wallace's Infinite Jest (1996), which Healy read during his time in Barbados. "I Couldn't Be More In Love" was also inspired by the experience, with the singer saying it is "not about love at all", but rather explores "being terrified of what happens when people stop caring". Healy and Daniel remained in contact during his time in rehab, which represented the longest time the two had spent apart, and the latter said: "It was a worrying time, because we’re so symbiotic, there can’t be problems like that."

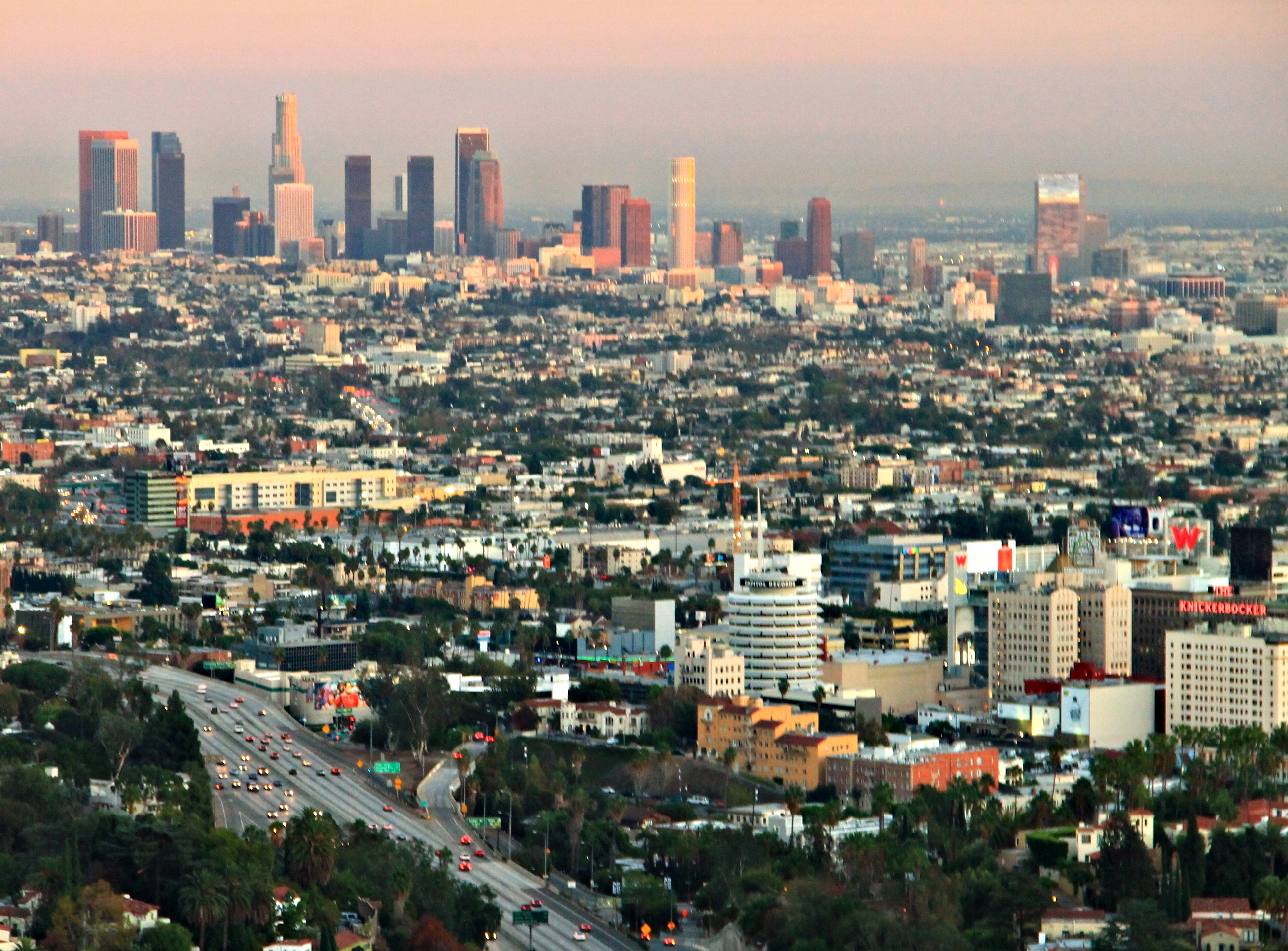
The band completed the album in Los Angeles, having lived there for several months.

While much of A Brief Inquiry into Online Relationships was written prior to Healy's stay in Barbados, The 1975 returned to the Northamptonshire studio in January 2018, where they remained for seven months. The singer told Indran Paramasivam of Bandwagon that the studio was chosen due to its seclusion and resemblance to his childhood farmhouse in Cheshire. Elsewhere in the UK, the band recorded sessions at various studios in London, including Abbey Road Studios with the London Community Gospel Choir. In late July, The 1975 returned to Los Angeles for four months to finalise the record and start working on Notes on a Conditional Form. Although the band worked on both albums simultaneously, Healy did not want to preserve any songs for Notes on a Conditional Form. During this period, the band lived and worked at Perfect Sound, a residential recording studio. Unlike The 1975's prior albums, it is the first not to be co-produced by Mike Crossey. Healy said that Crossey helped the band build confidence as producers with their first two albums; teaching them how to use a studio, how to record and guide the development their craft. Owing to the variety of recording locations utilised for A Brief Inquiry into Online Relationships, Healy felt that it was not "really conducive to have another element in there".

== Musical style ==
A musically experimental album, A Brief Inquiry into Online Relationships combines rock and pop music. Maura Johnston of Rolling Stone said its juxtaposition of various genres mirrors a music streaming playlist where "sophistipop fades into jazz fades into big-ticket MOR fades into Quiet Storm". The Daily Telegraph's Neil McCormick observed a "kaleidoscopic" variety of styles that reflects the album's engagement with contemporary culture and noted the presence of aesthetically unifying lyrical, vocal and instrumental factors. Writing that the record combines a "strange" mix of tones, genres and production into a singular aesthetic, Mike Watkins of Clash opined that it continues the experimental progression of I Like It When You Sleep, for You Are So Beautiful yet So Unaware of It. Writing for The Skinny, Harry Harris noted "a lot more lush, Postal Service-y electronica, and dreamy, cinematic collage-like phrases and choices", deeming the music a departure from the 1980s-style of the record's predecessor. Claire Biddles from The Line of Best Fit also felt the album is a musical departure from the band's second record, asserting that it eschews the "sunset pinks" and "pool blues" of their second album in favour of "a desolate sonic world".

"Mine"
A Brief Inquiry into Online Relationships incorporates jazz music on several songs, including "Mine", which features a trumpet solo from Roy Hargrove.

Chris Conaton of PopMatters, The Ringer's editorial staff and NME writer Dan Stubbs deemed the record "genre-hopping". Aimee Cliff of Dazed deemed it "an effervescent and experimental record", while Tampa Bay Times writer Jay Cridlin called the album a "lavish and experimental blockbuster". Writing for Paste, Marissa Matazzo said the album blends indie rock and electronic elements, while Conrad Duncan of Under the Radar classified the record as indie rock which incorporates jazz-rap, pop-reggaeton, "Gershwin balladry", IDM and Britpop. Thrillist writer Dan Jackson felt the album is rooted in electropop and R&B, with Ian Gormely of Exclaim! also calling it an electropop album. Sputnikmusic staff writer SowingSeason classified the album's musical style as a fusion of jazz, electronica, rock and pop, with Andrew Sacher of BrooklynVegan calling the use of the former genre "the most surprising twist on [the] album".

Interspersed with ambient interludes, the maximalist songs on A Brief Inquiry into Online Relationships are characterised by spaced-out electronic beats and flourishes, gospel choirs, saxophones, neo-soul horns, light piano, 1980s synths, "jaunty" melodies and downtempo rhythms. Healy's vocals are autotuned and distorted for much of the record, and he delivers the lyrics in a stream-of-consciousness style. The album features contributions from several guest collaborators. The London Community Gospel Choir provides choir vocals on "Love It If We Made It", "Sincerity Is Scary", "It's Not Living (If It's Not with You)" and "I Couldn't Be More in Love". Roy Hargrove performs the trumpet on "Sincerity Is Scary" and "Mine". Guendoline Rome Viray Gomez—known professionally as No Rome—co-wrote "TooTimeTooTimeTooTime" and performs the song's background vocals, drums, synthesiser and programming. Elsewhere, he provides the keyboards and programming for "Sincerity Is Scary" and the background vocals on "I Like America & America Likes Me". Amber Bain–known professionally as the Japanese House–contributes to "It's Not Living (If It's Not with You)", singing the background vocals in addition to performing the keyboard and electric guitar.

== Themes and lyrics ==
A concept album, A Brief Inquiry into Online Relationships explores digital communication and the internet's role in contemporary life. Several overarching narratives connect the record: society's relationship with technology, the millennial experience in the information age, and Healy's commitment to sincerity following the end of his heroin addiction. Healy compared the album to an essay meant to inform the listener without opinion or judgement, consciously avoiding portraying a dystopian society. The record eschews condescension and generalisation in an attempt to embrace contemporary life, utilising straightforward storytelling and simple lyrics that omit metaphors and ambiguity. Sacher observed a dark, conversational-style delivery that mimics a Twitter feed. For this reason, Cliff compared its structure to a newsfeed where "love and politics and comedy and culture all fight for attention".

"This whole Brief Inquiry into Online Relationships – semantically, we have to change how we see it, because when you say ‘online relationship’ you think of Tinder. But most people’s main relationship with their friends is in a group chat, or the broader reach of people is on their Instagram Story. These are online relationships."

— Healy, on the definition of an online relationship.

Rather than condemn and judge humanity's increasingly dependent relationship with technology, information and the internet, A Brief Inquiry into Online Relationships accepts their ubiquity and debates it by posing a series of new questions. The album questions whether honest interpersonal communication can survive in the digital era and examines trust in the internet age, the overstimulation of infinite content loops, confirmation bias, how people communicate with one another and the mania of the online world. Biddles opined that the album is "ostensibly about the internet's role in our lives", writing it continues the band's exploration of how people connect and what messages are lost through digital communications. Writing for Atwood Magazine, Sara Santora felt the record reflects the effects of social media addiction and the 24-hour news cycle on youth culture, causing millennials to be "constantly concerned with the state of our world".

A Brief Inquiry into Online Relationships attempts to document the millennial experience in the information age, serving as a cautionary political statement about modern society and contemporary existence. It avoids lambasting the "largely misunderstood generation", according to David Sackllah of Consequence, and instead showcases their achievement, wit and humanity. It reflects geopolitics, nihilism, ageing, the passage of time and the challenges faced by young people in society; searching for hope and authenticity, navigating life in a technologically advanced future, understanding their role in society, and their ability—or inability—to promote change. It also deals with the psychological impact of inheriting a global recession, climate change, xenophobia, the war on terror, dying industries and society on the brink of collapse. Regarding the impact of these events on the album's themes and lyrics, Stereogum's Ryan Leas said it depicts: "The static, the paralysis, the disenchantment, the fury, the dislocation, produced by a world that seems to be falling apart and the way the internet brings that right up to our faces constantly."

Abandoning postmodern irony and embracing sincerity, A Brief Inquiry into Online Relationships marks a definitive shift toward an honest dialogue about Healy's sobriety and recovery. Although reluctant to speak on his addiction, the singer did not want to romanticise or trivialise it and sought to avoid the "clichéd myth of the countercultural rebel junkie", using the lyrics to deter any fetishisation of his struggle. David Greene of NPR identified Healy's experience with heroin addiction and rehab as the album's "true focal point", while Biddles attributed the new commitment to sincerity to Healy's time in rehab. Throughout the album, Healy focuses on drug addiction and the desolation that it causes, using black humour to tell sordid stories that deal with millennial self-destruction. Writing for The Irish Times, Louise Bruton described the record as "[wandering] through the various darkened states of isolation until it finds faint glimmers of light to reach out for", covering dark subjects such as suicide, depression, anxiety, dissociation, trauma, disillusionment, self-loathing, cynicism and death.

== Songs ==
"How to Draw / Petrichor"
A 30-second sample of "How to Draw / Petrichor", showcasing the transition from the ethereal noises of "How to Draw" to the electro-industrial "Petrichor".

A sparse ambient, folk and electronic instrumental, "The 1975", serves as the intro of A Brief Inquiry into Online Relationships. "Give Yourself a Try", a lo-fi indie rock and post-punk song, encourages people to recognise their self-worth. Exploring how social media affects modern-day relationships, "TooTimeTooTimeTooTime" is an electropop and synth-pop track with a tropical house beat. Characterised by minimal lyrics which detail how Healy lied to his friends amid his addiction, "How to Draw / Petrichor" is a two-part experimental, electronica, ambient and UK garage interlude. The first part, "How to Draw", contains twinkling synths, a ringing music box, delicate embers of sound, an ethereal mixture of noises and a toy piano. It gradually builds, adding vocoded vocals before transitioning into the electro-industrial "Petrichor". The second half is built upon a dance beat and contains glitching electronics, a programmed drum beat, house-inspired vocals and elements of ska, before concluding with sparse piano chords in a techno outro. "Love It If We Made It" is an electro-rock ballad that deals with the vices of modern humanity, hypocrisy and disinformation. An acoustic song, "Be My Mistake", details unfaithfulness while on tour.

"Sincerity Is Scary", the seventh song on A Brief Inquiry into Online Relationships, reflects on modern communication problems and valuing irony over honesty, and is composed as an experimental neo soul, R&B and neo jazz ballad. Addressing gun control, "I Like America & America Likes Me" is an experimental electronic and alternative R&B power ballad. Siri performs the album's ambient spoken word intermission, "The Man Who Married a Robot / Love Theme", a satirical poem about society's willingness to sacrifice human connection for virtual gratification. The cautionary tale focuses on a lonely internet troll named SnowflakeSmasher86, who retreats into the internet; his only friend. The man falls in love with the internet and later dies, with Siri saying, "You can find him on Facebook", and the song transitions into an orchestral theme. A torch song, "Inside Your Mind", is composed as a sparse post-rock, noise pop, indie rock and downtempo power ballad. The lyrics alternate between love and violence, describing a desire to know the thoughts of a romantic partner.

"I Couldn't Be More in Love"
"I Couldn't Be More in Love", a synth-pop, R&B and soft rock power ballad, is one of several songs to feature the London Community Gospel Choir.

A Brief Inquiry into Online Relationships's 11th song, "It's Not Living (If It's Not with You)", is a pop, synth-rock and power pop track that draws parallels between heartbreak and addiction. "Surrounded by Heads and Bodies", an experimental indie rock and acoustic interlude, is a poem directed toward Angela that reflects upon Healy's time in rehab. Containing a stripped-back production, it has a loose composition that experiments with structure, eschewing a chorus in favour of a time-shifting drum beat. "Mine" is a jazz and lounge ballad which discusses a fear of commitment and fighting crime online, featuring brushed drums and a trumpet solo by Hargrove. A synth-pop, R&B and soft rock slow jam, "I Couldn't Be More in Love" is a power ballad containing keyboards and a choral backing from the London Community Gospel Choir. Lyrically, the song addresses the co-dependence between the band and their fanbase. The album's final song, "I Always Wanna Die (Sometimes)" is an experimental Britpop power ballad that details Healy's struggles with suicidal thoughts and offers honest reasons why suicide is not the answer.

== Release and promotion ==
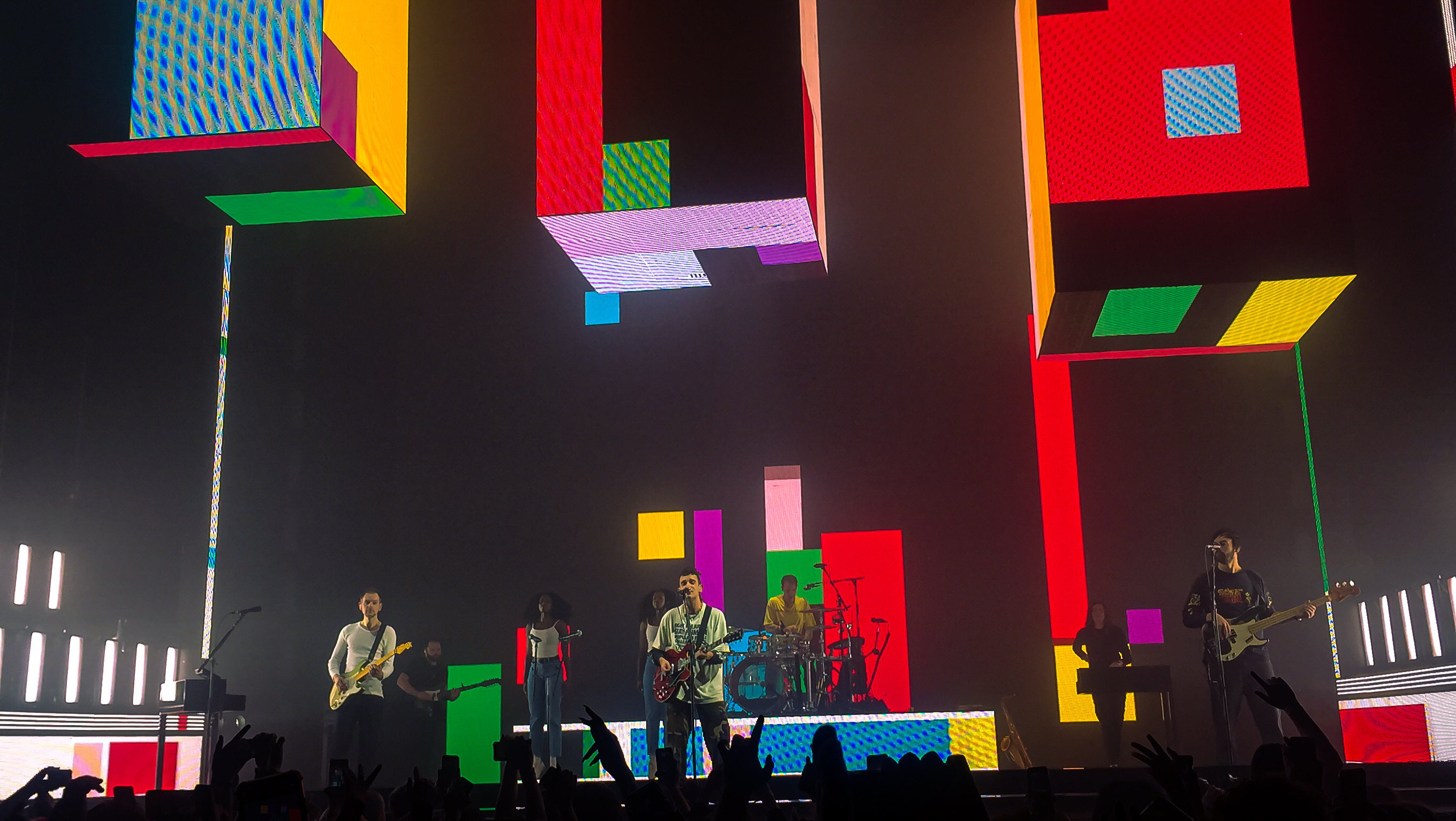
The 1975 performing in Nottingham, England in February 2020.

The 1975 announced the release date of A Brief Inquiry into Online Relationships and its tracklist on 10 September 2018. The band unveiled the album's artwork on social media the same day; it is a sparse and minimalist image containing tiny, colourful squares. Unlike The 1975's prior records, the artwork does not feature the band's signature rectangular box design. While some of the band's fanbase expressed their disappointment over its omission, Shahlin Graves of Coup de Main noted that various rectangles could be created by connecting the small squares. A Brief Inquiry into Online Relationships was officially released by Dirty Hit and Polydor Records on 30 November 2018.

To further promote the album, The 1975 embarked on the Music for Cars Tour. The UK and Ireland leg began in January 2019 and featured supporting acts No Rome and Pale Waves. Consisting of 22 shows, a North American leg of the tour began in Guadalajara on 20 March and concluded on 3 June in Toronto. Throughout the summer and fall of 2019, the band continued to perform throughout Europe, the Middle East and Oceania, beginning on 11 July in Trenčín and ending on 27 October in Perth. The 1975 returned to the US for a second leg of the tour, beginning in Camden on 16 November and concluding in Broomfield on 1 December. The planned second European leg of the Music for Cars Tour was postponed until October 2020 due to the band needing to complete the recording of Notes on a Conditional Form. It was deferred a second time to February 2021, due to the COVID-19 pandemic, while the third North American leg was suspended indefinitely. On 12 January 2021, The 1975 announced that the Music for Cars Tour would not resume.

=== Singles ===
"Give Yourself a Try" was released as the lead single from A Brief Inquiry into Online Relationships on 31 May 2018. An accompanying music video, directed by Diane Martel, was released on the same day. The visual features The 1975 performing the song in a mirrored room. The track was certified silver by the British Phonographic Industry (BPI), denoting sales of over 200,000 units in the UK, and earned a nomination for Best Rock Song at the 62nd Annual Grammy Awards in 2020. "Love It If We Made It" was released as the album's second single on 19 July. An accompanying music video, directed by Adam Powell, was released on 15 October. The visual depicts The 1975 performing the song as neon-coloured silhouettes, interspersed with found footage-style clips of war and significant pop culture events from the 2010s. The song was certified silver by the BPI and later won the 2019 Ivor Novello Award for Best Contemporary Song.

On 15 August 2018, "TooTimeTooTimeTooTime" was released as the third single from A Brief Inquiry into Online Relationships. An accompanying music video, depicting Healy and an array of people calmly singing the song's lyrics in front of different coloured backdrops, was released on 29 August 2018. The song was certified gold by the BPI, denoting sales of over 400,000 units in the UK. "Sincerity Is Scary" was released as the album's fourth single on 13 September. An accompanying music video, directed by Warren Fu, was released on 21 November. Inspired by classic musical films, the visual features numerous references and easter eggs related to The 1975's previous works. The video was met with a positive response and was deemed one of the best visuals of 2018 by Wonderland, Stereogum, NME, Billboard and HuffPost. The song was certified silver by the BPI. "It's Not Living (If It's Not with You)" was released as the album's fifth and final single on 18 October 2018. The song's music video, directed by Fu, was released on 13 December 2018. The visual is a tribute to Talking Heads' concert film Stop Making Sense (1984). The song was certified silver by the BPI.

== Commercial performance ==
A Brief Inquiry into Online Relationships debuted at number one on the UK Albums Chart with 50,000 album-equivalent units sold, becoming The 1975's third consecutive record to top the chart. It later ranked at number 85 on the chart's 2018 year-end edition and number 54 on its 2019 year-end edition. In Scotland, the album peaked at number one on the Scottish Albums Chart. It was later certified gold by the BPI, denoting sales of over 100,000 units in the UK. Elsewhere in Europe, the album reached number four in Ireland, number 13 in Latvia, number 16 in Sweden, number 36 in the Netherlands, number 44 in Flanders, number 57 in Germany, number 61 in Austria, number 62 in Spain, number 89 in Switzerland and number 178 in Wallonia. In the US, A Brief Inquiry into Online Relationships peaked at number four on the Billboard 200 chart and number one on the Billboard Top Rock Albums chart, while it later ranked at number 49 on the latter chart's 2019 year-end edition. Elsewhere in North America, the album peaked at number 15 on the Billboard Canadian Albums Chart. In Asia, A Brief Inquiry into Online Relationships reached number 24 on the Billboard Japan Hot Albums chart, number 39 in Japan and number 51 in South Korea. In Oceania, the album peaked at number four in Australia and number nine in New Zealand.

== Reception ==
=== Critical response ===
Professional ratings
Aggregate scores
Source	Rating
AnyDecentMusic?	8.0/10
Metacritic	83/100
Review scores
Source	Rating
AllMusic	3/5 stars
The Daily Telegraph	5/5 stars
The Guardian	4/5 stars
The Independent	4/5 stars
Mojo	4/5 stars
NME	5/5 stars
Pitchfork	8.5/10
Q	5/5 stars
Rolling Stone	3.5/5 stars
The Times	5/5 stars

A Brief Inquiry into Online Relationships was met with acclaim from contemporary music critics. Aggregating website Metacritic reports a normalised rating of 83, based on 29 critical reviews, indicating "universal acclaim". The website later ranked it as the 19th best-reviewed album of 2018. AnyDecentMusic? gave it 8.0 out of 10, based on their assessment of the critical consensus.

In a perfect five-star review, Harris praised Daniel's "beautiful" production and the musical variation present throughout A Brief Inquiry into Online Relationships, ultimately deeming it a "considered, ambitious album from a band who are constantly pushing themselves". Ross Horton of musicOMH similarly praised the album's ambition, saying: "Nobody makes things this brave anymore." Pitchfork's Ryan Dombal highlighted the record's "boundless sense of style", writing that Daniel and Healy's production feels "more purposeful" than that of I Like It When You Sleep, for You Are So Beautiful yet So Unaware of It. Gormely commended The 1975's ability to incorporate retro and contemporary influences to create music that sounds "new and familiar", and said their willingness to "fall flat on their face" distinguishes them from the "inoffensiveness of their pop peers". AllMusic's Matt Collar said the album's disparate sound works for individual songs, but as an album, it is "difficult to wade through as the social-media landscape it hopes to comment on". Conaton similarly dismissed the "scattershot" musical approach, writing the band "[throws] everything they can at the listener, and most of it just doesn’t stick".

Awarding A Brief Inquiry into Online Relationships a perfect five-star review, DIY's Will Richards deemed it a "bombastic, immaculately put together portrait of modern life", writing that the album's themes and lyrics transmit the feelings of youth culture. McCormick also commended Healy's songwriting, noting that the singer "easily [shifts] from witty sloganeering to tender confessional", while saying a "tone of urgent honesty pulses through the album, a visceral need to connect". Biddles lauded the record's exploration of relationships, writing that Healy displays "such a deep understanding of the small cruelties and vulnerabilities that punctuate our communication". Kitty Empire of The Observer praised the album for transforming "cliche-ridden topics" into "thoughtful" mainstream pop music. Describing the record as "stunning", Johnston highlighted its ability to portray important modern issues with humour and mournfulness, saying the album combines "fist-raising inspired by anthems with the gut-punch provided by precisely described longing". Writing for the Los Angeles Times, Mikael Wood wrote that despite being an "excellent [and] often thrilling" record that demonstrates Healy's understanding of such issues, the singer fails to recognise that he is "also more of a contributor than he likely realizes".

A Brief Inquiry into Online Relationships has frequently been referred to as a millennial version of OK Computer, with numerous critics drawing comparisons between the two records. Addressing the similarities in his review of the former album for The Boston Globe, Issac Feldberg felt it does not share the same sense of "doom and gloom" as OK Computer, and instead projects "its vision of life in the information age [as] too textured, too lived-in, to indulge the same shallow sanctimony that's hamstrung recent, analogous efforts by other artists". Hailing the record as "the millennial answer to OK Computer" in his perfect five-star review, Stubbs noted that OK Computer was created when the internet was seen as a "luxury", while four "digital natives" created a Brief Inquiry into Online Relationships. In his review of the album, Stephen Ackroyd of Dork declared it a "generation-defining masterpiece" reminiscent of both OK Computer and its followup Kid A (2000). When asked by Matt Wilkinson of Beats 1 Radio about the similarities, Healy said: "I'm so humbled. It's amazing but strange also."

=== Accolades ===
A Brief Inquiry into Online Relationships placed 26th on Metacritic's list of the best-received albums of 2018, based on inclusions in mainstream publications' year-end lists. The album ranked at number 14 on The Village Voice's annual Pazz & Jop mass critics' poll for 2018. A Brief Inquiry into Online Relationships also placed eighth on Uproxx's 2018 mass critics' poll. Regarding reception from music audiences, NPR listeners voted the record as the 11th-most popular album of 2018. On Pitchfork's 2018 Readers' Poll, the record was voted the 14th-best album of the year. A Brief Inquiry into Online Relationships won the award for British Album of the Year at the 2019 Brit Awards. The album was nominated for the 2019 Mercury Prize, which went to Dave's Psychodrama. Additionally, the record received a nomination for Best Album at the Q Awards.

Accolades for A Brief Inquiry into Online Relationships
Critic/Organization	Time span	Rank	Published year
Alternative Press	Year-end	*	2018
Atwood Magazine	Year-end	*	2019
Atwood Magazine	Decade-end	*	2019
Eve Barlow (The Guardian)	Year-end	1	2018
BBC	Year-end	13	2018
Billboard	Year-end	13	2018
Billboard	Year-end (Rock)	1	2018
BrooklynVegan	Year-end	49	2018
BrooklynVegan	Decade-end	95	2019
Clash	Year-end	26	2018
Cleveland Magazine	Decade-end	66	2019
Consequence	Year-end	19	2018
Dazed	Year-end	20	2018
Entertainment Weekly	Year-end	16	2018
Esquire	Year-end	13	2018
Erie Reader	Year-end	6	2018
Jenn Five (DIY)	Year-end	3	2019
Harriet Gibsone (The Guardian)	Year-end	20	2018
Gigwise	Year-end	15	2018
Joe Goggins (DIY)	Year-end	3	2019
The Guardian	Year-end	34	2018
GQ	Year-end	*	2018
iHeartRadio	Year-end (Alternative)	*	2018
The Independent	Year-end	29	2018
Insider	All-time	*	2020
Malcolm Jack (The Guardian)	Year-end	20	2018
Sarah Jamieson (DIY)	Year-end	3	2019
JOE	Year-end	14	2018
Alim Kheraj (The Guardian)	Year-end	9	2018
The Line of Best Fit	Year-end	8	2018
Los Angeles Times	Year-end	*	2018
Dorian Lynskey (The Guardian)	Year-end	1	2018
Lyndsey McKenna (NPR)	Year-end	*	2018
NME	Year-end	1	2018
NME	Decade-end	16	2019
Pitchfork	Year-end	21	2018
Pitchfork	Decade-end	157	2019
Q	Year-end	3	2018
Radio X	Year-end	*	2018
The Reader	Decade-end	*	2019
Will Richards (DIY)	Year-end	1	2019
Rolling Stone	Year-end	20	2018
Laura Snapes (The Guardian)	Year-end	11	2018
Spin	Year-end	1	2018
Spin	Decade-end	50	2020
Stereogum	Year-end	45	2018
Soundigest	Year-end (Alternative)	5	2018
Frazier Tharpe (Complex)	Year-end	4	2018
Thrillist	Year-end	20	2018
Time	Year-end	9	2018
The Times	Year-end	*	2018
Uproxx	Year-end	9	2018
Uproxx	Decade-end	74	2019
Wonderland	Year-end	*	2018
Yorkshire Evening Post	Year-end	1	2018

== Track listing ==
All tracks are written by George Daniel, Matthew Healy, Adam Hann and Ross MacDonald, and produced by Daniel and Healy, except where noted.

A Brief Inquiry into Online Relationships – Standard version
No.	Title	Length
1.	"The 1975"	1:34
2.	"Give Yourself a Try"	3:17
3.	"TooTimeTooTimeTooTime" (writers: Daniel, Healy, Guendoline Rome Viray Gomez)	3:28
4.	"How to Draw / Petrichor"	5:49
5.	"Love It If We Made It"	4:13
6.	"Be My Mistake"	4:16
7.	"Sincerity Is Scary"	3:45
8.	"I Like America & America Likes Me"	3:26
9.	"The Man Who Married a Robot / Love Theme"	3:33
10.	"Inside Your Mind"	3:50
11.	"It's Not Living (If It's Not with You)"	4:08
12.	"Surrounded by Heads and Bodies"	3:56
13.	"Mine"	4:06
14.	"I Couldn't Be More in Love"	3:51
15.	"I Always Wanna Die (Sometimes)" (producers: Daniel, Healy, Jonathan Gilmore)	5:14
Total length:		58:26

Japanese bonus track
No.	Title	Length
16.	"102"	3:27
Total length:		61:53

== Personnel ==
Credits adapted from A Brief Inquiry into Online Relationships album liner notes.

The 1975

- Matthew Healy – vocals (1–8, 10–15), piano (1, 4, 9–11, 13), guitar (2, 5, 6, 11, 12, 14, 15), keyboards (3, 4, 7, 8, 12–14), background vocals (11, 14, 15), drums (12), acoustic guitar (15)
- Adam Hann – guitar (2, 5, 7, 11, 13, 15)
- Ross MacDonald – bass guitar (2, 3, 5, 11, 14, 15), double bass (12, 13)
- George Daniel – programming (1–8, 10–12), synthesiser programming (1, 4, 7), drums (2–5, 7, 10, 11, 13–15), synthesiser (2, 3, 5, 8, 9, 11, 12, 14, 15), keyboards (3, 6–8, 11), percussion (3), background vocals (4, 7, 12), piano (13)

Additional musicians

- Guendoline Rome Viray Gomez – background vocals (3, 8), drums (3), programming (3, 7), synthesiser (3), keyboards (7)
- Amber Bain – background vocals, keyboard, electric guitar (11)
- London Community Gospel Choir – choir vocals (5, 7, 11, 14)
- Dave Fuest – basset clarinet (9)
- Gavin McNaughton – bassoon (9)
- David Stewart – bass trombone (9)
- Chris Allan – cello (9, 10, 13, 14)
- Chris Worsey – cello (9, 10, 13, 14)
- Ian Burdge – cello (9, 10, 13, 14)
- Sophie Harris – cello (9, 10, 13, 14)
- Jon Carnac – clarinet (9, 13)
- Sam Swallow – conductor, piano, and recording arrangement (9, 10, 13, 14)
- Chris Laurence – double bass (9, 10)
- Stacey Watton – double bass (9, 10)
- Paul Edmund Davies – flute (9, 13)
- John Ryan – French horn (9, 13)
- Richard Berry – French horn (9, 13)
- Skaila Kanga – harp (9, 13)
- Gareth Hulse – oboe (9)
- Chris Baron – percussion (9)
- Frank Ricotti – percussion (9)
- Clare Jeffries – piccolo (9)
- Andy Wool – trombone (9, 14)
- Ed Tarrant – trombone (9, 14)
- Andy Crowley – trumpet (9, 14)
- James Fountain – trumpet (9, 14)
- Andy Parker – viola (9, 10, 13, 14)
- Helen Kamminga – viola (9, 10, 13, 14)
- Martin Humbey – viola (9, 10, 13, 14)
- Peter Lale – viola (9, 10, 13, 14)
- Rachel Bolt – viola (9, 10, 13, 14)
- Debbie Widdup – violin (9, 10, 13, 14)
- Emil Chakalov – violin (9, 10, 13, 14)
- Everton Nelson – violin (9, 10, 13, 14)
- Kate Robinson – violin (9, 10, 13, 14)
- Kathy Gowers – violin (9, 10, 13, 14)
- Matt Ward – violin (9, 10, 13, 14)
- Natalia Bonner – violin (9, 10, 13, 14)
- Oli Langford – violin (9, 10, 13, 14)
- Patrick Kiernan – violin (9, 10, 13, 14)
- Perry Montague-Mason – violin (9, 10, 13, 14)
- Rita Manning – violin (9, 10, 13, 14)
- Simon Baggs – violin (9, 10, 13, 14)
- Sonia Slany – violin (9, 10, 13, 14)
- Tom Pigott-Smith – violin (9, 10, 13, 14)
- Roy Hargrove – trumpet (7, 13)
- Derek Stein – cello (15)
- Rudolph Stein – cello (15)
- David Campbell – conductor, piano, and string arrangement (15)
- Luke Maurer – viola (15)
- Thomas Lea – viola (15)
- Mario De Leon – violin (15)
- Michele Richards – violin (15)
- Nina Evtuhov – violin (15)
- Sara Parkins – violin (15)
- Songa Lee – violin (15)

Technical

- Robin Schmidt – mastering
- Mike Crossey – mixing (1, 2, 4–14), engineering (5, 10, 14)
- Manny Marroquin – mixing (3)
- Jonathan Gilmore – engineering (1, 3, 5–8, 10–15)
- Luke Gibbs – engineering (2, 5, 14), engineering assistance (3, 6, 7, 11–13, 15)
- Travis Warner – engineering (15)
- Nick Rives – engineering assistance (15)

Art direction

- Samuel Burgess-Johnson
- Matthew Healy

== Charts ==
=== Weekly charts ===
Chart performance for A Brief Inquiry into Online Relationships
Chart (2018)	Peak position
Australian Albums (ARIA)	4
Austrian Albums (Ö3 Austria)	61
Belgian Albums (Ultratop Flanders)	44
Belgian Albums (Ultratop Wallonia)	178
Canadian Albums (Billboard)	15
Dutch Albums (Album Top 100)	36
German Albums (Offizielle Top 100)	57
Irish Albums (IRMA)	4
Japan Hot Albums (Billboard Japan)	24
Japanese Albums (Oricon)	39
Latvian Albums (LAIPA)	13
New Zealand Albums (RMNZ)	9
Scottish Albums (Official Charts)	1
South Korean Albums (Gaon)	51
South Korean International Albums (Gaon)	5
Spanish Albums (Promusicae)	62
Swedish Albums (Sverigetopplistan)	16
Swiss Albums (Schweizer Hitparade)	89
UK Albums (Official Charts)	1
US Billboard 200	4
US Top Rock Albums (Billboard)	1

=== Year-end charts ===
2018 year-end chart performance for A Brief Inquiry into Online Relationships
Chart (2018)	Position
South Korean International Albums (Gaon)	68
UK Albums (OCC)	85

2019 year-end chart performance for A Brief Inquiry into Online Relationships
Chart (2019)	Position
UK Albums (OCC)	54
US Top Rock Albums (Billboard)	49

== Certifications ==
Region	Certification	Certified units/sales
United Kingdom (BPI)	Platinum	300,000^{‡}
^{‡} Sales+streaming figures based on certification alone.

== See also ==
- The 1975 discography
- List of songs by Matty Healy
