= It's Not Living (If It's Not with You) =

2018 song by the 1975

Single by the 1975

from the album A Brief Inquiry into Online Relationships
- Released: 18 October 2018
- Genre: Pop; synth-rock; power pop
- Length: 4:08
- Label: Dirty Hit; Polydor
- Songwriters: Matthew Healy; George Daniel; Adam Hann; Ross MacDonald
- Producers: Matthew Healy; George Daniel

The 1975 singles chronology
"Sincerity Is Scary" (2018)	"It's Not Living (If It's Not with You)" (2018)	"People" (2019)

Music video
- "It's Not Living (If It's Not with You)" on YouTube

"It's Not Living (If It's Not with You)" is a song by English band the 1975 from their third studio album, A Brief Inquiry into Online Relationships (2018). The song was written by band members Matty Healy, George Daniel, Adam Hann and Ross MacDonald, and produced by Daniel and Healy. It was released on 18 October 2018 by Dirty Hit and Polydor Records as the fifth and final single from the album. Contributions are featured from the London Community Gospel Choir, who provide the choir vocals, and Amber Bain–known professionally as the Japanese House–who performs several instruments and provides the background vocals. Healy was reluctant to write a song about his former heroin addiction, which prompted him to develop the narrative around Danny, a character meant to represent Healy's struggle with heroin.

A gospel-influenced pop, synth-rock and power pop song, "It's Not Living (If It's Not with You)" is evocative of the music of the 1980s. The song's production comprises jangly funk guitars, an electric guitar, sparkling synths and influences of teen pop, Britpop, indie pop, country-pop and synth-pop. Thematically, it draws parallels between heartbreak and addiction while exploring the topics of isolation and dystopia. The lyrics discuss unrequited love and a failed relationship, telling a story of someone who does not want to move on after the end of a romance.

"It's Not Living (If It's Not with You)" was acclaimed by contemporary music critics, many of whom deemed the song an album highlight and praised its 1980s-influenced production, themes and lyrics. The song later appeared on several critics year-end lists for 2018. It peaked at number 46 on the UK Singles Chart, number 36 in Scotland, number 48 in Ireland and number 19 on the US Billboard Hot Rock & Alternative Songs chart. The song was later certified silver in the United Kingdom by the British Phonographic Industry (BPI). An accompanying music video, directed by Warren Fu, was released on 3 December 2018. A tribute to Talking Heads' concert film Stop Making Sense (1984), the visual features Healy's journey through several strange realities while he experiences numerous dreams within a dream and includes appearances from No Rome and the Japanese House. The video received positive reviews from contemporary critics, who praised the dream-like quality and references to the 1980s.

== Background and release ==
"I think I'm trying to consciously hide it behind being somebody else [...] I didn't want to talk about being a heroin addict for five years—having actual nightmares of the idea of it being uncovered. So there was a humorous reluctance to disclose it in this song."

— Healy, on disclosing his struggle with heroin addiction in "It's Not Living (If It's Not with You)".

Healy did not want to write about heroin addiction until he achieved sobriety, having been a drug addict for five years. He told Sam Sodomsky of Pitchfork that simply being a heroin user did not justify writing a song about it. He wanted to avoid romanticising heroin, worrying about becoming an "obnoxious celebration of that kind of sickness". Instead, Healy referenced Kurt Cobain, who he said was "so publicly the coolest person in the world [...] he was telling his truth". Healy was reluctant to discuss his past drug use in "It's Not Living (If It's Not with You)", telling Sodomsky that he used to have nightmares about his addiction being discovered. When writing the song, Healy hid behind a fictional character named Danny–a metaphor for himself–to tell a story of the character's struggle and their strife with heroin addiction. Additionally, Healy was inspired by filmmaker John Hughes. To build anticipation for the song's release, the 1975 posted cryptic social media updates such as a typographic funnel composed of the title and the official lyric sheet. It was officially released as a single on 18 October 2018, debuting as the Hottest Record on Annie Mac's self-titled BBC Radio 1 show.

== Music and lyrics ==
"It's Not Living (If It's Not with You)"
A 24-second sample of "It's Not Living (If It's Not with You)", showcasing the song's chorus, with Healy singing alongside the London Community Gospel Choir over jangly funk guitars and sparkling synths.

"It's Not Living (If It's Not with You)" is a gospel-influenced pop, synth-rock and power pop song with a length of four minutes and eight seconds (4:08). The song's production consists of drums, keyboards and an electric guitar performed by Amber Bain, bright, jangly funk guitars, sparkling synths, gospel cries and elements of teen pop, Britpop, indie pop, country-pop and synth-pop. It contains choir vocals from the London Community Gospel Choir and background vocals from Bain–who has the stage name of the Japanese House. Dan Stubbs of NME called "It's Not Living (If It's Not with You)" a "Pretty in Pink [(1986)]-style power-pop banger that sings dreamily about heroin as if it were a great lost love". Pryour Stroud of Slant Magazine wrote that the song's opening guitar figure evokes an image of a fist thrust into a neon sky. Ross Horton of musicOMH called it "your favourite kind of 1975 track: plastic [1980s] pop you can see cropping up in any number of montages".

The lyrics discuss using substance abuse as a coping mechanism for dealing with a failed relationship and unrequited love, striking a parallel between heartbreak and addiction. The song tells a story of someone who does not want to move on when a relationship has run its course, with Healy using Danny–a physically broken petrol station employee–as a stand-in for himself. In the pre-chorus, Healy sings about how the object of his affection will "collapse my veins wearing beautiful shoes", which Sasha Geffen of Pitchfork said creates an image of "a stiletto that's also a needle". In the chorus, he discusses his abject loneliness: "All I do is sit and drink without you." Elsewhere, the song explores themes of isolation and dystopia, such as the idea that humans exist within a simulated reality. Geffen said "It's Not Living (If It's Not with You)" functions as both "a lovesick song and a song about recovery, wrapped together so tightly it's hard to find the seam" and compared it to Belinda Carlisle's "Heaven Is a Place on Earth" (1987). Will Richards of DIY called the song a "heart-thumping pop epic that confronts Matty's heroin addiction head-on". Consequence of Sound writer David Sackllah classified it as a tragic love song that narrates the lure of addiction and Healy's struggle with heroin. Similarly, Conrad Duncan of Under the Radar deemed the song "an instant-classic love song that's really about addiction".

== Reception ==
"It's Not Living (If It's Not with You)" received high acclaim from contemporary music critics. Harry Harris of The Skinny deemed "It's Not Living (If It's Not with You)" one of the three standouts from A Brief Inquiry into Online Relationships. Similarly, Dorian Lynskey of Q declared the song one of four highlights from the album. He called it a "glitteringly perfect hit", saying the song sounds as if it emerged from a wormhole from the 1980s. Sackllah declared "It's Not Living (If It's Not with You)" as one of the album's three-best songs, praising its ability to incorporate a story about addiction "without glorifying it or sounding like a PSA". Horton felt the song is "clearly" the best track on A Brief Inquiry into Online Relationships, writing: "It sounds heavenly, like a couple of teenagers falling in love over a summer in Malibu in 1986." In his review of A Brief Inquiry into Online Relationships, Ryan Leas of Stereogum felt the singles–including "It's Not Living (If It's Not with You)"–are the strongest songs on the album. He said that the song combines 1980s influences with epic, contemporary rock, the former of which serve as elements of "classic pop touchstones [that] still serve the 1975 best".

Geffen praised "It's Not Living (If It's Not with You)" for pairing dark lyrics with a bright production and upbeat chorus, calling the song the "tightest" single from A Brief Inquiry into Online Relationships while saying "Healy has all but perfected the art of making self-deprecation sound like a great time". Stubbs called the song funny, clever and refreshingly honest. Richards praised it for being both an intimate personal account and a relatable, transferable statement, and noted that the song helps provide the anchor to the overall album. Melissa LaGrotta of Soundigest praised the beat of "It's Not Living (If It's Not with You)", saying it "really just makes you want to dance". Mike Watkins of Clash commended the song's "atmospheric euphoria". Matt Collar of AllMusic praised the song for returning to the "sparkling" sound of the band's early songs and noted it recreates the sound of 1989, specifically the work of Stock Aitken Waterman.

In a mixed review, Chris Conaton of PopMatters praised the songwriting but felt "It's Not Living (If It's Not with You)" is not fresh or interesting, opining that the song is "such a dead-on '80s synth-rock track that it suffers in comparison to actual '80s hits like Simple Minds' 'Don't You (Forget About Me)' [(1985)]". Juan Rodriguez of No Ripcord said that in comparison to the "near-perfect" melody of "Love It If We Made It", the song comes across as a "simpler, lesser version".

=== Accolades ===
Atwood Magazine deemed "It's Not Living (If It's Not with You)" one of the best songs of 2018; Mitch Mosk praised the rich harmonies, catchy melodies, colour, grace and majestic warmth, saying the song left him speechless. Sputnikmusic staff writer SowingSeason declared the track the best pop song of 2018 and called it the "best 80's pop song that never happened until now". British GQ ranked "It's Not Living (If It's Not with You)" fifth on their 2018 year-end songs list, with Anna Conrad comparing the song to "Heaven Is a Place on Earth" while calling it a "bittersweet hit". Pitchfork ranked the song at number 60 on their year-end list, calling it a dark meditation on drug use and a "ruthlessly efficient pop [machine]".

NME declared the track the 30th-best song of 2018, with Rhian Daly calling it a melodic dream while saying the line "collapse my veins wearing beautiful shoes" is one of the most stunning lyrics about drug consumption ever written. The publication also deemed "It's Not Living (If It's Not with You)" the eighth-best song of the band's career, with TC saying the track "takes what ought to be a tough listen and spins it into a miraculous rebirth". Stereogum ranked it at number 14 on their 2018 year-end list; Chris DeVille praised the song's revisionist nostalgia and "brand of [1980s] adult contemporary ultracheese".

=== Sales ===
"It's Not Living (If It's Not with You)" performed modestly on international music charts. It reached number 46 on the UK Singles Chart and number 36 in Scotland. It reached number 48 on the Irish Singles Chart and number 2772 on Portugal's year-end chart. It reached number 19 on the US Billboard Hot Rock & Alternative Songs chart and number 80 on the year-end edition. "It's Not Living (If It's Not with You)" was certified silver in the UK by the British Phonographic Industry (BPI), denoting sales of over 200,000 units.

== Music video ==
=== Background and release ===
An accompanying music video, directed by Warren Fu, was released on 3 December 2018. The visual is a tribute to Talking Heads' concert film Stop Making Sense (1984); Healy wakes up from several dreams within a dream, experiencing numerous different realities. It also features guest appearances from No Rome and the Japanese House. Healy originally wanted to create a performance video for "It's Not Living (If It's Not with You)". He later decided to make it more surreal, adding dream sequences and references to the 1975's favourite movies. Additionally, Healy wanted to create a music video where the band enters through a door into the previous visual. While on a lunch break, the 1975 shot a scene for the video while filming "Sincerity Is Scary", despite them not having completed writing of the song.

=== Synopsis ===
The music video for "It's Not Living (If It's Not with You)" was largely inspired by Talking Heads' concert film Stop Making Sense (1984).

The music video begins with Healy waking up in bed. He sits up and looks at a collection of alarm clocks on his nightstand before going to the mirror, where his reflection shrieks at him. Hann wakes Healy up, who is revealed to be taking a nap backstage before the 1975's concert. After knocking over a glass, Healy emerges on stage in an oversized beige suit similar to the suit worn by David Byrne, joining the band and dancers to perform jog-like dance moves. As he gets on the stage, it becomes apparent that something is awry, and he becomes disoriented by several strange events; the band either plays too slow or Healy moves too fast, time slows down and Healy's mouth disappears. His pants spontaneously combust and he leaps offstage, eventually drowning.

Healy emerges from the water and sees a copy of himself, who sends him a wink and a kiss. He takes a step back from the chaos, and the music stops. After exiting through a door, he emerges on the set of the "Sincerity Is Scary" video, wearing a rabbit hat and headphones. He watches his clone skip down the street while practising a dance routine which was featured in the video. Healy returns to the concert, where the dancers have robotically continued performing without music, and he rejoins them before sinking into the floor. Eventually, Healy awakes backstage before the start of the concert, ending the video in the same way it begins. As the visual concludes, retro yellow credits are overlaid atop footage of the performance.

=== Reception ===
Brooke Bajgrowicz of Billboard called the music video a "dreamlike collage" and a "hallucination-filled '80s-style montage". She felt the video represents the disorientation and struggles associated with addiction. Grant Sharples of Alternative Press included "It's Not Living (If It's Not with You)" on his list of 10 music videos from the 1975 that should be made into feature-length films. He said the visual is preternaturally dark, calling it a brilliant homage to Stop Making Sense that metaphorically represents the difficulties of Healy's struggle with heroin withdrawal. Winston Cook-Wilson of Spin called the video a hallucinatory tribute to Stop Making Sense and compared it to Black Mirror, saying: "Perhaps Charlie Brooker should get in touch." Beth Casteel of Alternative Press also drew comparisons to Black Mirror. Jordan Darville of The Fader observed similarities to the concert film, specifically the large suits and "carefree vibes". Amy Smith of NME called the music video surreal, saying Healy's mannerisms are similar to Byrne's, while the backup dancers are nearly identical to those from Byrne's concert film. Ben Kaye of Consequence of Sound said the visual contains "all the quirky charm the band has really mastered" on A Brief Inquiry into Online Relationships. Braudie Blais-Billie of Pitchfork called it self-referential and surreal. Shahlin Graves of Coup de Main said the music video is excellent and specifically praised Adam Hann's performance.

== Credits and personnel ==
Credits adapted from A Brief Inquiry into Online Relationships album liner notes.

- Matthew Healy – composer, producer, piano, guitar, vocals, background vocals
- George Daniel – composer, producer, programming, drums, keyboards, synthesizer
- Adam Hann – composer, guitar
- Ross MacDonald – composer, bass guitar
- Amber Bain – keyboard, electric guitar, background vocals
- Jonathan Gilmore – recording engineer
- Luke Gibbs – assistant recording engineer
- Robin Schmidt – mastering engineer
- Mike Crossey – mixer

== Charts ==
=== Weekly charts ===
Chart performance for "It's Not Living (If It's Not with You)"
Chart (2018–2019)	Peak position
Ireland (IRMA)	48
Scotland Singles (Official Charts)	36
Switzerland Airplay (Schweizer Hitparade)	94
UK Singles (Official Charts)	46
US Hot Rock & Alternative Songs (Billboard)	19
US Rock & Alternative Airplay (Billboard)	35

=== Year-end charts ===
2019 year-end chart performance for "It's Not Living (If It's Not with You)"
Chart (2019)	Position
US Hot Rock & Alternative Songs (Billboard)	80

== Certifications ==
Certifications and sales for "It's Not Living (If It's Not with You)"
Region	Certification	Certified units/sales
New Zealand (RMNZ)	Platinum	30,000^{‡}
United Kingdom (BPI)	Platinum	600,000^{‡}
United States (RIAA)	Gold	500,000^{‡}
^{‡} Sales+streaming figures based on certification alone.

== See also ==
- The 1975 discography
- List of songs by Matty Healy
