= Erie Reader =

American alternative newspaper

- Type: Alternative
- Owner: Flagship Multimedia
- Editor: Adam Welsh & Brian Graham
- Managing editor: Katie Chriest
- Founded: 2011
- Headquarters: 1001 State Street; Suite 901; Erie, PA, 16501; United States
- Price: free
- Website: www.eriereader.com

Previous logo

The Erie Reader is an Erie, Pennsylvania alternative newspaper which focuses on local news, culture and entertainment. It was founded on March 28, 2011, by Adam Welsh and Brian Graham.

The Erie Reader is a free publication and is distributed bi-weekly in most neighborhoods throughout the Erie region on Wednesdays, with approximately 15,000 copies distributed to over 300 high foot-traffic locations. It is Erie's only independently run print newspaper.

The Erie Reader is known for several of its annual issues including Erie's 40 Under 40, I2E (Otherwise known as the Industry, Innovation, and Entrepreneurship Issue) and their Best of Erie issue.
