= I Like America & America Likes Me =

2018 song by the 1975

Song by the 1975

from the album A Brief Inquiry into Online Relationships
- Released: 30 November 2018
- Genre: Electronic; alternative R&B
- Length: 3:26
- Label: Dirty Hit; Polydor
- Songwriters: Matthew Healy; George Daniel; Adam Hann; Ross MacDonald
- Producers: Matthew Healy; George Daniel

Lyric video
- "I Like America & America Likes Me" on YouTube

"I Like America & America Likes Me" is a song by English band the 1975 from their third studio album, A Brief Inquiry into Online Relationships (2018). The song was written by band members Matty Healy, George Daniel, Adam Hann and Ross MacDonald, while Daniel and Healy handled the production. Guendoline Rome Viray Gomez provides the background vocals. The song was created as a homage to SoundCloud rap, while the title is a reference to an art performance by Joseph Beuys, titled I Like America and America Likes Me.

An experimental power ballad, "I Like America & America Likes Me" is composed in the genres of electronic and alternative R&B. The production combines atmospheric synths, hi-hats and a dense trap and hip hop beat. The song also incorporates elements of hip hop, SoundCloud rap, trap and ambient music. Healy delivers the lyrics, which dissect his relationship with fame and plead for a world without gun violence, in a heavily-autotuned stream of consciousness style. Thematically, the song deals with social issues such as consumerism, mass shootings and gun control, among others.

Upon release, "I Like America & America Likes Me" received generally positive reviews from contemporary music critics. Praise was directed toward the song's sonic experimentation and sharp lyricism, comparing it to the work of Bon Iver. The song reached number 29 in New Zealand and number 44 on the US Billboard Hot Rock & Alternative Songs chart. To promote the song, the 1975 performed it at several music festivals and on The Late Late Show with James Corden. An accompanying lyric video was released on 18 January 2019. It features the song's lyrics superimposed over footage of cityscapes, social media messages and weather apps, among others.

== Background and development ==
"If everybody did what I did for a job, there would be less of a divide. That sounds like a really fucking massive statement to make, but what I'm saying is: If you do the same thing in different places all the time, it's exactly the fucking same thing."

— Healy, on the differences between the United States and the rest of the world.

The 1975 released their second studio album I Like It When You Sleep, for You Are So Beautiful yet So Unaware of It in February 2016 to critical and commercial success. Domestically, it topped the UK Albums Chart and the Scottish Albums Chart. In the United States, the album peaked at number one on the US Billboard 200, Top Alternative Albums and Top Rock Albums charts. The album received positive reviews and is considered by various publications as one of the best albums of 2016. In April 2017, the band announced their third studio album would be titled Music For Cars, set for release in 2018. In April 2018, posters promoting Music For Cars began emerging around London and Manchester. However, in May, Healy announced that Music For Cars would now represent an "era" composed of two studio albums. The first, A Brief Inquiry into Online Relationships (2018), was released in November of the same year and includes "I Like America & America Likes Me".

Speaking to Sam Sodomsky of Pitchfork, Healy said that "I Like America & America Likes Me" was originally written as a tribute to SoundCloud rap. Describing the genre as the current sound of the US to him "at the moment", the singer had originally planned to release the song composed entirely of mumble lyrics, hoping to find "how far [he] could take it". Regarding the song's use of Auto-Tune, Healy said he enjoyed how the tool stops, compresses and punctuates his voice, turning it into an instrument. When asked by Sodomsky if touring has affected his perception of the US, the singer said he found similarities in every country the 1975 visits, saying: "Every night looks, smells, sounds, reacts, and operates exactly the same way." He told the interviewer that despite differences in personality and appearance, most people were united by their fear of dying.

== Music and lyrics ==
"I Like America & America Likes Me"
A 23-second sample of "I Like America & America Likes Me", showcasing Healy's heavily-autotuned vocals atop skittering hi-hats, atmospheric synths and a dense trap and hip hop beat.

Musically, "I Like America & America Likes Me" is an experimental power ballad, composed in the genres of electronic and alternative R&B. The song has a length of three minutes and 26 seconds (3:26). The production comprises a dense trap and hip hop beat, skittering hi-hats, synth chords, synth drums, twinkling electronic elements and fizzing, atmospheric synths. It contains elements of hip hop, SoundCloud rap, trap and ambient music. Healy's vocals in "I Like America & America Likes Me" are heavily autotuned, transforming into a series of slogans. Salvatore Maicki of The Fader described the singer's vocals as "cranked to a point where it nearly sounds like he's gasping for air", while Will Richards of DIY noted that he uses autotune in a "lyric-masking extreme", and Dan Stubbs of NME said the song is "Kanye-level in its virtuosic use of autotune". Guendoline Rome Viray Gomez–who has the stage name of No Rome–provides the background vocals. The title is a reference to an art performance by Joseph Beuys entitled I Like America and America Likes Me, in which Beuys remained in a room with a coyote for three days.

Lyrically, "I Like America & America Likes Me" dissects Healy's relationship with fame and pleads for a safer world without the constant threat of gun violence. The song features impassioned, frank observations about youth culture. Thematically, the track deals with the anxieties of modern living and gun violence in the US. "I Like America & America Likes Me" is delivered in a stream of consciousness style; only a few lines are discernable as the beat nearly overpowers Healy's vocals, with Ryan Dombal of Pitchfork saying: "It's impossible to tell exactly where his actual voice ends and where the digitized effects take hold." The song is composed of short phrases that tackle social issues such as consumerism, mass shootings, gun control ("Kids don't want rifles, they want Supreme" and "No gun required, or will this help me lay down?"), Healy's mortality ("I'm scared of dying!") and the anxieties of modern life ("Am I a liar?! / Will this help me lay down?!"). Throughout the track, Healy repeatedly exclaims the phrase "Would you please listen!", near-begging the listener in heavily processed vocals.

The lyrics of "I Like America & America Likes Me" reference streetwear brand Supreme.

Randall Roberts of the Los Angeles Times classified "I Like America & America Likes Me" as "aggro-R&B", while Juan Rodriguez of No Ripcord deemed the song a half-convincing ode to SoundCloud rap, and Conrad Duncan of Under the Radar called it "mumble rap but pop". Joe Goggins of Drowned in Sound said the beginning of the song is reminiscent of Sigur Rós but the end has the "sort of aggressively electronic flourish that wasn't part of the musical lexicon until a couple of years ago". Claire Biddles of The Line of Best Fit compared the line "I'm scared of dying / it's fiiiiiine!" to "a friend who is only able to tell of their darkest thoughts in the context of a joke on Twitter". Nicole Almeida of Atwood Magazine said the lyrics speak to the increasing anxiety felt by the younger generation post-Brexit and Donald Trump. Eddie Fu of Genius noted the references to the streetwear brand Supreme were possibly inspired by the 2018 March for Our Lives rally, where a teenager brought a sign that read: "It's easier to buy a gun than buy Supreme".

== Reception ==
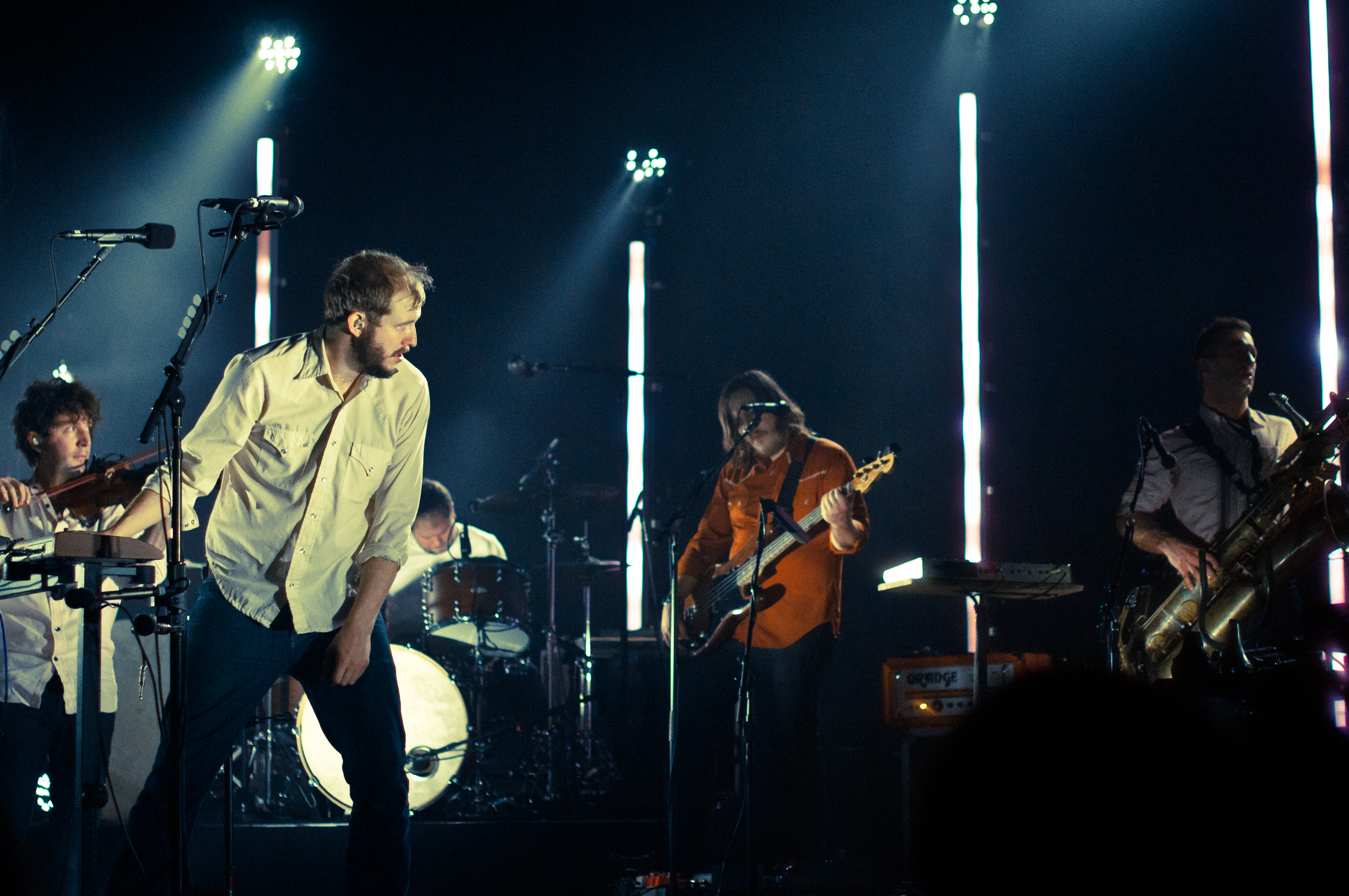
Several reviewers compared "I Like America & America Likes Me" to the work of Bon Iver.

Upon release, "I Like America & America Likes Me" was met with generally positive reviews from contemporary music critics. In his review of A Brief Inquiry into Online Relationships, Goggins noted the 1975 "truly soars" when exploring new sonic ground, with him using "I Like America & America Likes Me" as an example. He specifically praised Daniel's production, calling it "musically the beating heart". Richards praised the song's "roared" chorus, saying Healy "[refuses] to accept any millennial stereotypes". Mike Watkins of Clash deemed the track one of the album's moments of "all-encompassing brilliance". Ross Horton of musicOMH said "I Like America & America Likes Me" sounds "fresh". Chris DeVille of Stereogum compared the song to the work of Bon Iver. In his review of the album, Issac Feldberg of The Boston Globe noted the band sounds "creatively unmoored" on songs such as "I Like America & America Likes Me", which he said sounds like Bon Iver-adjacent autotune. Dombal called the song a "trap remix of a Bon Iver ayahuasca trip" and interpreted the meaning of the track to be a "meter [reading] of a society that's moving too fast to process anything in a meaningful way".

Harry Harris of The Skinny deemed "I Like America & America Likes Me" one of the three standouts from A Brief Inquiry into Online Relationships. He viewed the song as a companion to the 1975's "Love It If We Made It" (2018) that explores the same anxiety, but also a "desire to try and work your way out of it. To try and take some responsibility." Rodriguez praised the track for taking the band's songwriting in an unexpected direction, saying: "Given how both [t]he 1975 and much of the mumble rap class share a love for emo music, it's as if they're bidding farewell to their foundational core before they entirely abandon it." Stubbs called the lyrics "razor-sharp". Maicki opined that the autotune used on Healy's vocals in "I Like America & America Likes Me" serves to emphasizes the futility of the song's message. He did observe a faint amount of hope in the track's desperation, but ultimately felt it "contends that hope is not enough". Shannon Cotton of Gigwise said Healy "continues to exercise his well informed perspective on world politics", while comparing the track's synths to the 1975's early EPs.

In a mixed review, Micah Peters of The Ringer compared "I Like America & America Likes Me" to Trippie Redd and said "the song is about, feels like, and sounds like overstimulation". Houston Wiltsey of The Reader said the song represents one of the album's few missteps, describing it as over-processed and noting the track lacks replay value. In a negative review, Chris Conaton of PopMatters called "I Like America & America Likes Me" musically inert, saying: "It's like Healy thought that his snippets of statements were so important that they didn't need an actual song to buttress them." "I Like America & America Likes Me" debuted at number 29 in New Zealand and number 44 on the US Billboard Hot Rock & Alternative Songs chart.

== Promotion ==
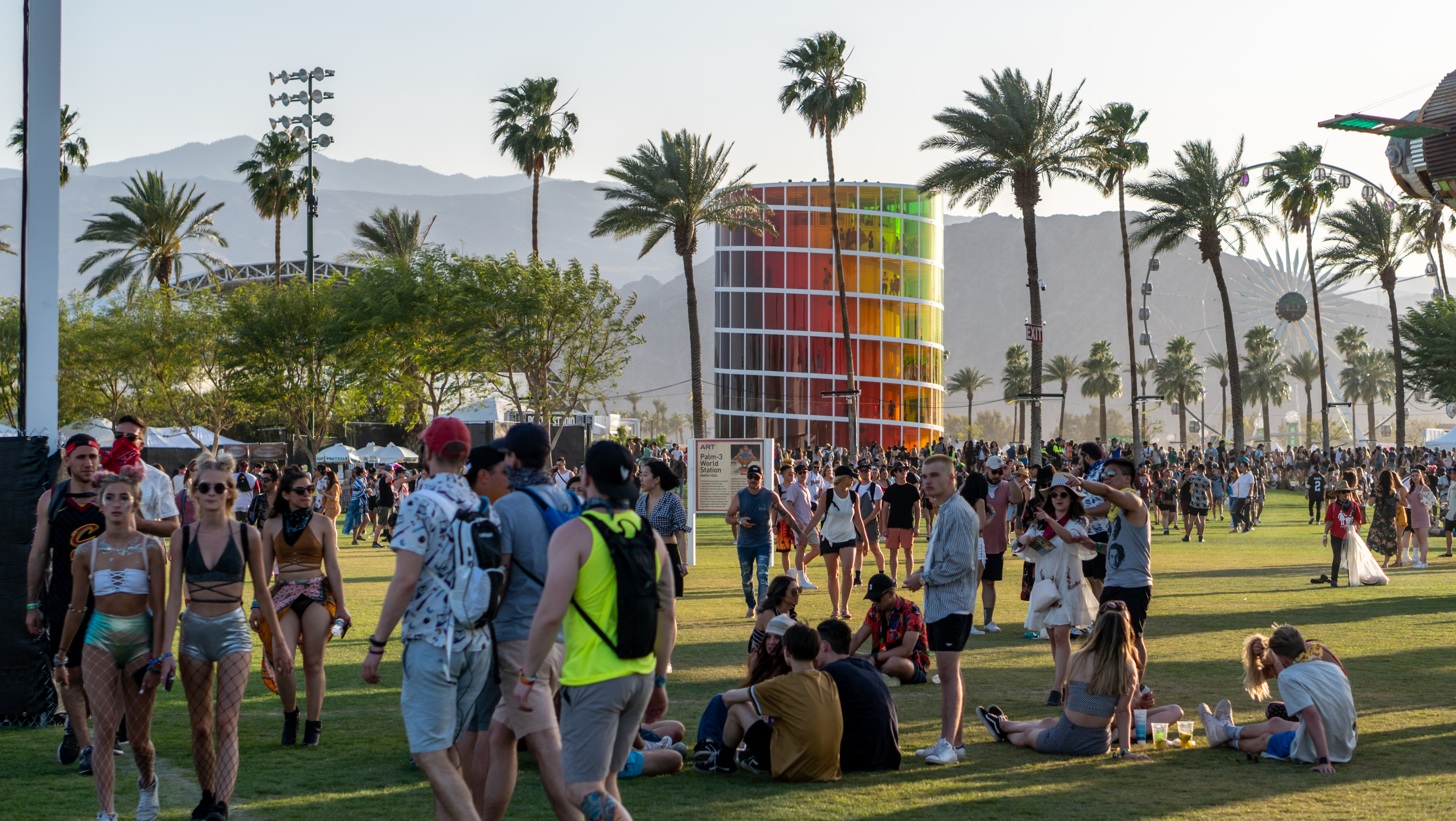
The 1975 performed "I Like America & America Likes Me" at several music festivals, including the 2019 Coachella Valley Music and Arts Festival.

To promote "I Like America & America Likes Me", an accompanying lyric video was released on 18 January 2019. The video features glitchy footage of cityscapes, social media messages and weather apps, among others, while the lyrics scroll across the screen. In April 2019, the 1975 performed the song as part of their setlist at the Coachella Valley Music and Arts Festival. The track was also included as part of their setlist at Rock Werchter on 29 June 2019. The band played an early afternoon slot on the main stage, while the production was stripped back to a lone light up box. Ali Shutler of Dork praised the performance's energy, saying: "It feels dangerous but still makes perfect sense on giant stages." The 1975 performed the song again at Mad Cool in July 2019, accompanied by disquieting lyrics that flashed up behind them. Stubbs called the performance a "stunning, stark and serious moment".

On 22 July 2019, the 1975 appeared on The Late Late Show with James Corden to perform "I Like America & America Likes Me". The performance began with Healy wearing an electric blue jumpsuit and red Converse high-tops, accompanied by two female backup dancers, synchronized flashing lights and echoing synths. The singer began the performance on the stage with the other band members before taking a seat in James Corden's chair. As he sang the opening lines, the backup dancers began to perform. Healy put his feet on the desk and gave a thumbs up before jumping onto the desk. The singer looked down into the camera as he danced and sang, pouting before pushing the lens to highlight the other members. After rejoining the 1975, he climbed onto the kick drum for a few lines, ending the performance with a hug from Corden. Marissa Matozzo of Paste praised the "impassioned" performance, commending Healy for using his platform to bring awareness to gun-related trauma. Gil Kaufman of Billboard labelled the performance "intense". Katrina Nattress of iHeartRadio called it a spirited performance and noted the band broke the show's conventional stage layout. Similarly, Winston Cook-Wilson of Spin called the performance spirited and theatrical, while saying that Healy "tapped into his seemingly endless [fountain] of energy".

On October 10, 2022, the band recorded a live performance version of the song at the Real World Studios. The first minute of the video sees Healy and the band set up the performance and testing the former's vocals. The song features new production, with the electronic sound being replaced for a "stripped-down piano version".

== Credits and personnel ==
Credits adapted from A Brief Inquiry into Online Relationships album liner notes.

- Matthew Healy – composer, producer, keyboards, vocals
- George Daniel – composer, producer, keyboards, programming, synthesizer
- Adam Hann – composer
- Ross MacDonald – composer
- Guendoline Rome Viray Gomez – background vocals
- Jonathan Gilmore – recording engineer
- Robin Schmidt – mastering engineer
- Mike Crossey – mixer

== Charts ==
Chart performance for "I Like America & America Likes Me"
Chart (2018–19)	Peak position
New Zealand (Recorded Music NZ)	29
US Hot Rock & Alternative Songs (Billboard)	44

== Notable versions and covers ==
American singer-songwriter Charli Adams recorded a cover of the song in 2020 as a single.

== See also ==
- The 1975 discography
- List of songs by Matty Healy
