= Give Yourself a Try =

2018 single by The 1975

Single by The 1975

from the album A Brief Inquiry into Online Relationships
- Released: 31 May 2018
- Genre: Indie rock; post-punk
- Length: 3:17
- Label: Dirty Hit; Polydor
- Songwriters: Matthew Healy; George Daniel; Adam Hann; Ross MacDonald
- Producers: Matthew Healy; George Daniel

The 1975 singles chronology
"By Your Side" (2017)	"Give Yourself a Try" (2018)	"Love It If We Made It" (2018)

Music video
- "Give Yourself a Try" on YouTube

"Give Yourself a Try" is a song by English band The 1975 from their third studio album, A Brief Inquiry into Online Relationships (2018). The song was written by band members Matty Healy, George Daniel, Adam Hann and Ross MacDonald, while Daniel and Healy handled the production. It was released on 31 May 2018 by Dirty Hit and Polydor Records as the lead single from the album. The band was inspired by the works of Joy Division, specifically their track "Disorder", which Healy said stemmed from both acts originating from Macclesfield. He wrote the song using a mix of autobiographical and fictional elements, wanting to capture the health and social anxiety experienced by millennials.

A lo-fi indie rock and post-punk song, "Give Yourself a Try" revolves around an aggressive pop-punk guitar riff reminiscent of "Disorder". The former's production consists of post-punk guitars, a robotic synth hook, a motorik-leaning beat and influences of Britpop, synth-pop, pop, pop-punk and garage punk. Thematically, it deals with maturing and escaping the trappings of fame, with Healy calling for people to recognise their self-worth and become a part of the world. Lyrically, the song covers ageing, identity and introspection, among others.

Upon release, "Give Yourself a Try" received positive reviews from contemporary music critics, who compared it to the Strokes and praised the lyrics and production, noting the song expands The 1975's sound while retaining their signature style. The song later appeared on several year-end lists and earned a nomination for Best Rock Song at the 62nd Annual Grammy Awards in 2020. Commercially, it reached number 22 on the UK Singles Chart, number 27 in Scotland, number 51 in Ireland and number 12 on the US Billboard Hot Rock & Alternative Songs chart. The song was later certified silver in the United Kingdom by the British Phonographic Industry (BPI). An accompanying music video, directed by Diane Martel, was released on 31 May 2018. The visual–which Healy said was inspired by Lady Gaga and self-reflection–features the band performing the song in a mirrored room.

== Background and release ==
In January 2018, Healy tweeted: "122 days", which led precisely to 1 June. The 1975 later deleted their website and all of their social media accounts. On 1 May 2018, the band uploaded a cryptic Instagram post that read: "Hello." In the same month, their website was updated with a video composed of a cinematic score alongside several images, such as a room full of servers, AI robots, a cityscape filled with skyscrapers, laughing children, a Cardi B video and one of Kanye West's tweets. Additionally, it contained a mysterious countdown clock leading to 1 June 2018. However, BBC Radio 1 began running advertisements for The 1975's appearance on Annie Mac's self-titled radio show, set for 31 May 2018. It was then announced that the song would be released one day earlier than intended, while the title was revealed to be "Give Yourself a Try". On 31 May, the song was officially released as the lead single from A Brief Inquiry into Online Relationships.

== Writing and recording ==
"['Give Yourself a Try' is] about how, whether it's through pop culture or literature, you're presented with the idea of these destinations of happiness, of being a grown-up and feeling OK about yourself—and it never really happens."

— Healy, on the meaning behind "Give Yourself a Try".

Healy described "Give Yourself a Try" as a punk song, "a kind of, post-punk song", meant to represent anxiety–specifically health and social anxiety that afflicts his generation. The singer said he liked that the song retained an "inherent prettiness" that exists in The 1975's music, feeling it was representative of the tension present on A Brief Inquiry into Online Relationships. Healy also said that "Give Yourself a Try" is a reference to "Disorder" (1979) by Joy Division. According to The 1975 member, it was impossible to escape the presence of Joy Division's influence in Macclesfield, where both bands originated from. Regarding the song, he wanted to essentially use the same riff from the band's "Disorder". Rather than sample the song, The 1975 offered Joy Division some of the publishing rights. Regarding this decision, Healy said: "I don't care about making money — I want to make amazing records."

Healy was asked to explain the lyrics of "Give Yourself a Try" in an interview with Dan O'Connell of Radio X, which he said was difficult because "it means different things to you at different times". According to the singer, it became difficult to differentiate between which parts of the song are autobiographical and which are fictional. He used a line about STDs as an example, saying: "I don't know where that line came from, I just remember thinking it was funny." However, Healy admitted that the lyrics regarding drug addiction are autobiographical. He found it challenging to write about his drug issues, saying it was hard to remain objective and not become emotional. Overall, the singer classified "Give Yourself a Try" as a statement about being a millennial, saying it is about "searching for that truth in amongst things that you thought were going to provide you with the answer".

== Music and lyrics ==
"Give Yourself a Try"
A 20-second sample of "Give Yourself a Try", showcasing its insistent, motorik-leaning beat, layers of feedback, robotic synth hook and aggressive swirling pop-punk guitar riff reminiscent of "Disorder".

Musically, "Give Yourself a Try" is a lo-fi indie rock and post-punk song with a length of three minutes and 17 seconds (3:17). According to sheet music published at Musicnotes.com by Sony/ATV Music Publishing, "Give Yourself a Try" is set in the time signature of common time with a fast tempo of 184 beats per minute. The track is composed in the key of B major, with Healy's vocals ranging between the notes of E_{3} and F♯_{4}. It follows a chord progression of B5–B/D♯–Esus2. "Give Yourself a Try" is constructed around a deliberately aggressive, swirling pop-punk guitar riff reminiscent of Joy Division's "Disorder". The former's production contains an electronic backing, post-punk guitars, "springy" basslines, scratchy layers of feedback, heavy synths, a robotic synth hook, an insistent, motorik-leaning beat, a bare-bones drum machine, staticy drums and a skittering drum beat. The song has influences of Britpop, synth-pop, pop, pop-punk and garage punk.

Thematically, "Give Yourself a Try" is about growing up and escaping the trappings of fame, with Healy calling for people to recognise their self-worth and become a part of the world. The song encourages genuine self-improvement and acknowledgement of past mistakes, urging people to give themselves a try while offering permission to be who they are. The singer uses sarcasm, self-deprecation and sardonicism in the free-associative lyrics, which focus on modern debates, his musings of ageing and identity, the suicide of a young fan, introspection, isolation, frivolity and responsibility. Healy speaks from a position of authority and offers advice: "You learn a couple things when you get to my age / Like friends don't lie and it all tastes the same in the dark". The song focuses on regret and self-criticism in the verses, countered by the choruses, which display a more uplifting tone as the singer repeats: "Won't you give yourself a try?" Elsewhere, Healy sings about finding grey hairs in a spliff, becoming "spiritually enlightened at 29", contracting STDs, settling into a new version of oneself and the absence of context in modern internet dialogue.

Lars Gotrich of NPR compared "Give Yourself a Try" to a cross between the "quirky-guitar-jangle" of Phoenix and a sped-up version of "Instant Crush" (2013) by Daft Punk and Julian Casablancas. Cameron Cook of Pitchfork wrote: "Unlike most of The 1975's recent work, this track leaves behind the synth-pop and '80s bombast for something more raw and analog." Steven Kline of Gigwise said the song sounds like the Strokes' "Hard to Explain" (2001) if it were written by Alexa. Thomas Smith from NME said the guitar riff would not sound out of place on the Strokes' Room on Fire (2003). Patrick Hosken of MTV News noted the song "synthesizes generational problems often reduced to overblown bellyaches by folks not affected". Morgan Enos from Billboard wrote that "Give Yourself a Try" focuses on "the point in your 20s when you ease up on sowing your wild oats and focus on settling in". Ben Beaumont-Thomas and Laura Snapes of The Guardian compared the song's riff to Room on Fire "rendered as a polyphonic ringtone", while noting the lyrics veer between ludicrous and devoutly sincere, which "[suggest] being kinder to yourself as you grow up".

== Reception ==
=== Critical response ===
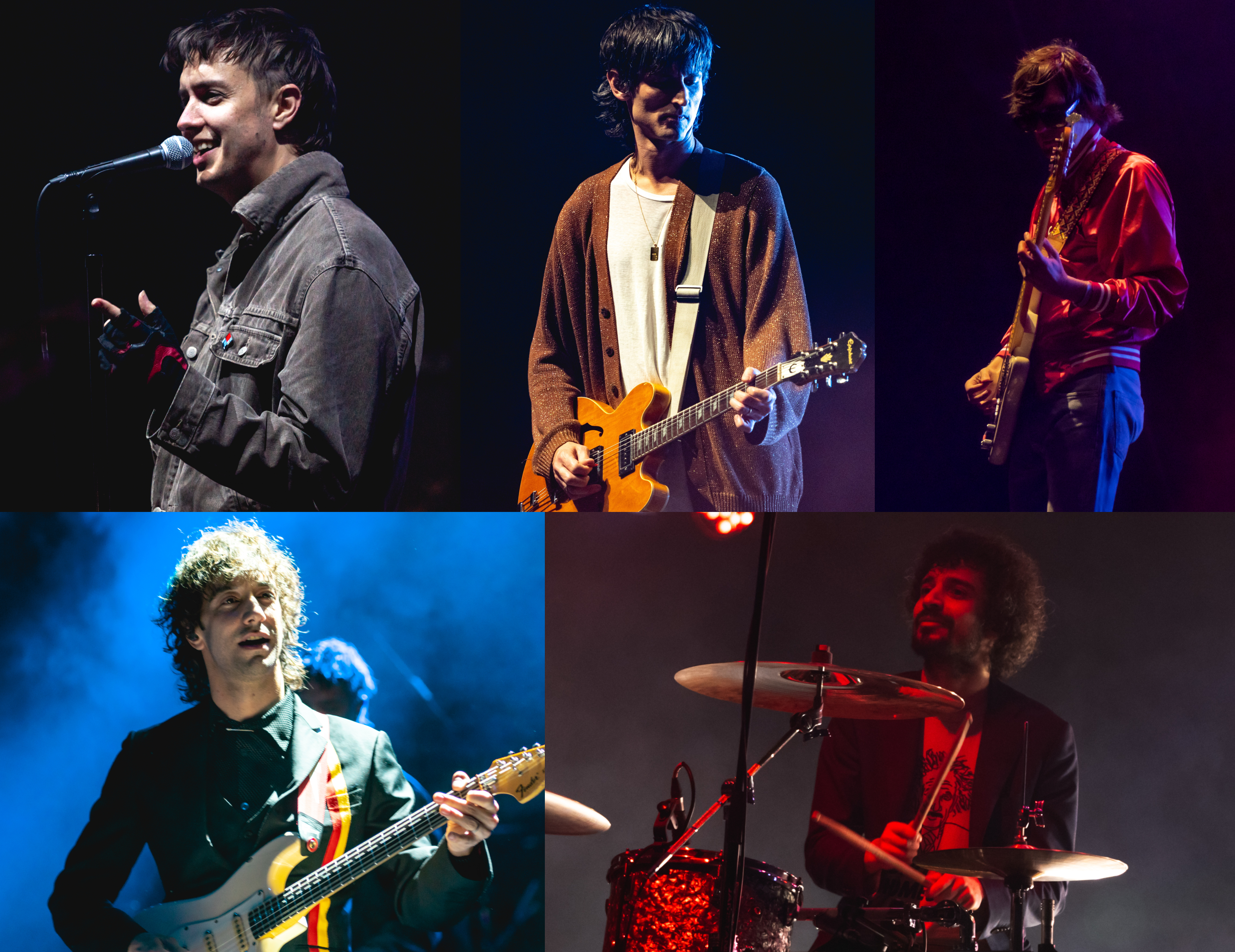
Several critics viewed "Give Yourself a Try" as reminiscent of the Strokes.

Upon release, "Give Yourself a Try" was met with positive reviews from contemporary music critics. Billboard deemed it the fourth-best rock song of 2018 and the 37th-best overall, with A.U. saying the song's "emotional directness is nearly as shocking as the sound of its distorted, piercing guitar riff crackling out of the speakers". NME ranked the song at number 49 on their year-end list, with Smith calling it a musical curveball that sets up a theme of introspection present in A Brief Inquiry into Online Relationships. Spin labelled "Give Yourself a Try" the 20th-best song of 2018. It later received a nomination for Best Rock Song at the 62nd Annual Grammy Awards.

Jon Pareles and Giovanni Russonello of The New York Times included "Give Yourself a Try" on their weekly playlist, with the former praising the song's production and "constant bite". Beaumont-Thomas and Snapes included the song on their June 2018 playlist, saying it sounds unlike anything else on the radio while suggesting the song serves as a sign that The 1975 is growing in "weird and wonderful ways". Cook said "Give Yourself a Try" marks a new era for the band that solidifies them as an ironic pop act masquerading as a sincere rock band; he wrote the song is possibly their most realised and uplifting track to date. Smith said the song reinforces the band's pop roots, commenting that it feels "like a teaser for a far greater trick yet to come". Andrew Sacher of BrooklynVegan praised them for continuing to change their sound in interesting ways, noting "Give Yourself a Try" unexpectedly touches on darker topics that appropriately accompany its "sugar-sweet" melodies.

Mike Wass of Idolator called "Give Yourself a Try" a change of pace for The 1975, noting the song swaps the big, bold sound of their singles "Love Me" (2015) and "Somebody Else" (2016) for something grittier, and said it "sounds like more of statement of intent" rather than a lead single. Phil Witmer of Vice noted the song pivots away from the 1980s-inspired sophisti-pop of I Like It When You Sleep, for You Are So Beautiful yet So Unaware of It, while praising the humorous lyrics and guitar riff, commenting that it "would have lit up the New York City indie rock scene in 2002". Joshua Copperman of Spin said "Give Yourself a Try" is emblematic of The 1975's signature sound, while noting it is more minimal than their previous works, comparing the song to a major-key version of "Disorder" if it were rendered by the Strokes. Michael Cragg of The Guardian praised the song's youthful zest and observed a departure from the band's previous INXS-inspired sound, writing it amalgamates influences from Joy Division, the Strokes' "12:51" (2003) and mid-2000s pop-punk. Similarly, Maura Johnston of Rolling Stone compared the song to the Strokes' "Hard to Explain" (2001), saying it falls somewhere within the jittery, riff-heavy modern-rock ideal.

Ross Horton of musicOMH praised the affirmative messages present in "Give Yourself a Try" and predicted it would sound "superb" in a live setting. B.C. of GQ said the song filters melancholic themes through a self-help prism, praising the hopeful and wistful tone while comparing it to the Strokes, stating that "it's the closest I've felt to hearing the Strokes for the first time since, well, hearing the Strokes for the first time". Juan Rodriguez of No Ripcord called it a "dark, yet sincere look into Healy's restless self-searching". Enos wrote that the transition from childhood to adulthood can be both celebratory and scary, but by having a "dry-wit jam like 'Give Yourself a Try' under your belt, a gnarly life change can also be a blast". Claire Biddles of The Line of Best Fit said Healy fulfils his promise of sincerity and solemnity, believing these characteristics were more pronounced on "Give Yourself a Try" compared to their previous works. While describing the song as grave, serious and confessional, Biddles opined: "Any worries of self-help corniness are dampened by Healy's generous delivery." Libby Cudmore of Paste said the song is reminiscent of MGMT's "Time to Pretend" (2008), opining that Healy's "nasally vocals [paint a] melancholic picture of a misspent adulthood". Jon Blistein of Rolling Stone called "Give Yourself a Try" thrilling, praising Healy's vocals for providing a "soft touch".

=== Commercial performance ===
In The 1975's native United Kingdom, "Give Yourself a Try" peaked at number 22 on the UK Singles Chart and number 27 in Scotland. The song was later certified silver by the British Phonographic Industry (BPI), denoting sales of over 200,000 units in the UK. Elsewhere in Europe, it reached number 51 in Ireland. In the United States, "Give Yourself a Try" peaked at number 12 on the US Billboard Hot Rock & Alternative Songs chart and number 19 on the US Billboard Rock Airplay chart, while it later ranked at number 98 on the former chart's year-end edition. Additionally, the song peaked at number 94 in Australia.

== Music video ==
Healy's eccentric look in the video, such as orange hair and a purple smokey eye, was inspired by Lady Gaga.

An accompanying music video, directed by Diane Martel, was released on 31 May 2018. Speaking on the visual, Healy said: "I wanted to capture the excitement and the kind of frenetic energy that was in 'Love Me'." The video opens with Healy laying on a therapy bed, discussing his psyche and confidential thoughts regarding his personal issues, saying: "You know, the best thing is to actually be as earnest as I feel; because I know what I'm doing, just everything I do, it knows what it is." The psychologist that he turns to is revealed to be a teddy bear statue wearing a suit, whom Healy criticises for not being good at his job. In the same moment, a framed college degree dramatically falls off the wall and onto the floor. The singer–shown with bright orange hair and a purple smokey eye–then joins the other members of The 1975–all of whom wear matching black suits–in a mirrored room to jam and dance to the song. Some of the unorganised, mysterious lyrics from the song are presented with closed captioning throughout the video.

Rania Aniftos of Billboard said The 1975 delivered a high-energy video equal to the "electrifying" song. Courtney Gould of Soundigest thought the therapy scene is meant to symbolise Healy's personal growth and overall changes as he has aged, while the teddy bear signifies how the singer is unable to find solutions to his problems through others' help. Overall, she opined the visual represents Healy's discovery that he is the only person who can help navigate his life. Healy later revealed that his eccentric appearance in the visual was inspired by Lady Gaga, while the mirrored room is a metaphor for self-reflection.

== Credits and personnel ==
Credits were adapted from A Brief Inquiry into Online Relationships album liner notes.

- Matthew Healy – composer, producer, guitar, vocals
- George Daniel – composer, producer, programming, drums, synthesiser
- Adam Hann – composer, guitar
- Ross MacDonald – composer, bass guitar
- Luke Gibbs – recording engineer
- Robin Schmidt – mastering engineer
- Mike Crossey – mixer

== Charts ==
=== Weekly charts ===
Chart performance for "Give Yourself a Try"
Chart (2018)	Peak position
Australia (ARIA)	94
Ireland (IRMA)	51
Scottish Singles Sales (Official Charts)	27
UK Singles (Official Charts)	22
US Hot Rock & Alternative Songs (Billboard)	12
US Rock & Alternative Airplay (Billboard)	19

=== Year-end charts ===
2018 year-end chart performance for "Give Yourself a Try"
Chart (2018)	Position
US Hot Rock & Alternative Songs (Billboard)	98

== Certifications ==
Certifications and sales for "Give Yourself a Try"
Region	Certification	Certified units/sales
United Kingdom (BPI)	Gold	400,000^{‡}
^{‡} Sales+streaming figures based on certification alone.

== See also ==
- The 1975 discography
- List of songs by Matty Healy
