= TooTimeTooTimeTooTime =

Single by the 1975

from the album A Brief Inquiry into Online Relationships
- Released: 15 August 2018
- Genre: Electropop; synth-pop
- Length: 3:28
- Label: Dirty Hit; Polydor
- Songwriters: Matthew Healy; George Daniel; Guendoline Rome Viray Gomez
- Producers: Matthew Healy; George Daniel

The 1975 singles chronology
"Love It If We Made It" (2018)	"TooTimeTooTimeTooTime" (2018)	"Sincerity Is Scary" (2018)

Music videos
- "TooTimeTooTimeTooTime" on YouTube; "TooTimeTooTimeTooTime" (Vertical version) on YouTube

"TooTimeTooTimeTooTime" (stylised in all caps) is a song by English band the 1975 from their third studio album, A Brief Inquiry into Online Relationships (2018). The song was written by Matty Healy, George Daniel, and Guendoline Rome Viray Gomez, who has the stage name of No Rome, while production of the song was handled by the former two. It was released on 15 August 2018 by Dirty Hit and Polydor Records as the third single from the album. The beat originated from an accident that occurred during "Narcissist", the band's collaboration with No Rome. Having developed a skeletal song structure, the band created the song to celebrate their varied discography and fondness of pop music.

"TooTimeTooTimeTooTime" is an electropop and synth-pop song that revolves around a four-on-the-floor tropical house beat. In addition to the main genres, the song draws from a diverse set of musical styles including Afrobeats, dancehall, Europop, disco and sophisti-pop. Its production consists of Afropop-influenced percussion, fuzzy synths, a kick drum pulse, electric guitars, vocal samples and piano stabs. Thematically, the song explores communication in the digital age, specifically how social media and the internet can impact relationships, leading to infidelity. In the lyrics, Healy tries to recount the number of times he has called a woman.

Upon release, "TooTimeTooTimeTooTime" received positive reviews from contemporary music critics, who praised the song's playful lyricism, upbeat production and sonic experimentation. Commercially, the song peaked at number 26 on the UK Singles Chart, number 29 in Scotland, number 29 in Ireland, number 17 on the US Billboard Hot Rock & Alternative Songs chart and number 17 on the Sweden Heatseeker chart. The song was later certified platinum in the United Kingdom by the British Phonographic Industry (BPI). An accompanying vertical music video premiered on 15 August 2018, while the fullscreen version was released on 29 August 2018. It depicts Healy and a group of fans dancing and lip synching the song's lyrics in front of a changing multicoloured backdrop.

== Background and recording ==
"Negotiating these things that are like relationships in a world that's constructed on so many things that just aren't, in the way that Instagram or Twitter or whatever, can get into the nooks and crannies of one's real relationships. I don't think you have to be monogamous or not to know how that feels. And [there's] almost like a frivolity to it, which I sort of like, because I don't do frivolity very often."

— Healy, on the theme of infidelity present in "TooTimeTooTimeTooTime".

In an interview on the BBC Radio 1 show Annie Mac's Hottest Record in the World, Healy revealed that "TooTimeTooTimeTooTime" was created accidentally during the recording of "Narcissist" (2018), the 1975's collaboration with No Rome. The pair were working on the song's production when according to Healy: "[...] something went wrong. It just started looping too fast and the beat in 2 time just kind of appeared. And then we just made that." Having developed a skeletal, reggaeton-influenced song structure, Healy began writing the demo for "TooTimeTooTimeTooTime". Speaking with Sam Sodomsky of Pitchfork, Healy said that he wanted to celebrate the band's musically varied discography, condensing the track into a pop song, which he admitted felt counterintuitive. The singer described the song as unapologetically representing his fondness for pop music, saying it does not "negate [his] intellect or integrity". Furthermore, he noted that it would not work if he tried to be verbose, wanting the song to resonate with fans and be enjoyable like he considers music to be "about at some point". The final version of "TooTimeTooTimeTooTime" was written and produced by Daniel and Healy, while No Rome provides additional songwriting, programming, drums, synths and background vocals.

== Music and lyrics ==
"TooTimeTooTimeTooTime"
A 24-second sample of "TooTimeTooTimeTooTime", highlighting the soft, insistent four-on-the-floor tropical house beat, Afropop-influenced percussion and piano stabs.

Musically, "TooTimeTooTimeTooTime" is an electropop and synth-pop song that is built around a soft, insistent four-on-the-floor tropical house beat, running for a length of three minutes and 28 seconds (3:28). The song contains a unique structure that subverts the common "loud-quiet verse-chorus" format and instead gradually builds in intensity as it progresses. Pyror Stroud of PopMatters noted the song contains a "sheer, implacable momentum" that continuously builds before culminating in a climax that he deemed "the closest [the 1975] has come to pure pop perfection". According to sheet music published at Musicnotes.com by Hal Leonard Music Publishing, "TooTimeTooTimeTooTime" is set in the time signature of common time with a moderate tempo of 116 beats per minute. The track is composed in the key of Ab major, with Healy's vocals ranging between the notes of E♭_{3} and E♭_{4}. It follows a chord progression of Db–Bbm7–Eb(add4)–Ab(add9)/C. "TooTimeTooTimeTooTime" has a breezy, melodic production, composed of upbeat Afropop-influenced percussion, fuzzy synth textures, and upbeat groove, watery synth chords, a steady kick drum pulse, funk-style electric guitar lines, pitch-shifted vocal samples, electronic flourishes and piano stabs. The song's production also draws from house music, Afrobeats, dancehall, sophisti-pop, ambient, bubblegum pop, indietronica, disco, piano house, electronic music and Europop.

Thematically, "TooTimeTooTimeTooTime" explores how social media can affect modern-day relationships. The song expands upon the theme of communication in the digital age, a central topic in A Brief Inquiry into Online Relationships. In the chorus, Healy attempts to recount the number of times he has called a certain woman ("I only called her one time / Maybe it was two times? / I don't think it was three times / It can't be more than four times"), before accusing his partner of doing the same ("I think we need to rewind / You text that boy sometimes / Must be more than three times"). Rolling Stone writer Ryan Reed commented that "TooTimeTooTimeTooTime" discusses "how social media fuels jealous head games and romantic angst" through suspicious text messages, missed phone calls and Instagram interactions. Tiana Timmerberg of Radio.com viewed the core thematic story behind the song as a tale of love and desperation, a sentiment shared by Billboard writer Chris Payne, who wrote that the track "captures [Healy's] side of a back-and-forth with a romantic partner [...] Both parties appear to be getting into the same kind of mischief."

Ross Horton of musicOMH wrote that "TooTimeTooTimeTooTime" is reminiscent of tropical house music run through Brian Eno's processors. Similarly, Philip Cosores of Uproxx observed a blend of retro aesthetics with contemporary sonics, exemplified by its use of both Auto-Tune on Healy's vocals and pulsing rhythms evocative of Peter Gabriel. Jordan Sargent of Spin said the song "bends even further back towards the unnaturally gleaming, synthetic concoctions of European balearic dance music and dancehall". He compared the track to Drake's mid-tempo dancehall songs, specifically "Controlla" (2016) and "Signs" (2017), along with the Felix Jaehn remix of "Cheerleader" (2014) by Omi. Pryour Stroud of Slant Magazine felt "TooTimeTooTimeTooTime" is a reflection of modern infidelity, saying it's "about how we self-medicate in a world of such stark superficiality that nothing seems to matter". This observation was echoed by Spin writer Ian Cohen in his review of A Brief Inquiry into Online Relationships, with him calling the song a deconstruction of Instagram-era infidelity. Juan Rodriguez of No Ripcord opined that the track "looks into how the digital era broadens the gray areas when it comes to emotional affairs with an almost matter-of-fact indifference".

== Release and reception ==
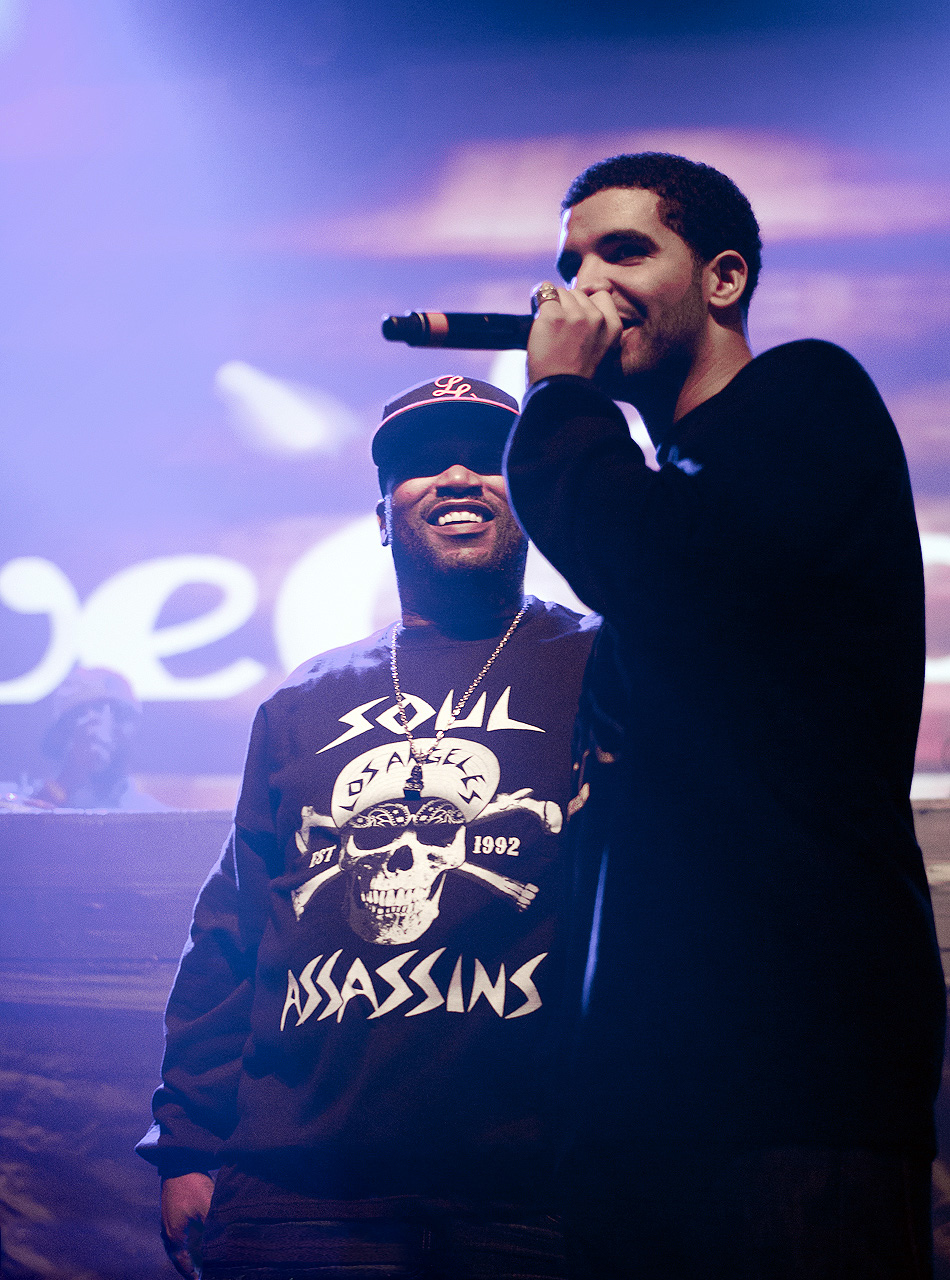
Several critics drew comparisons between "TooTimeTooTimeTooTime" and the work of Canadian musician Drake.

"TooTimeTooTimeTooTime" was released on 15 August 2018. PopMatters declared the song the 16th best track of 2018; Stroud called it "fun, plain and simple, like cotton candy or a cannonball into a pool". Julianna Ress of The Ringer deemed "TooTimeTooTimeTooTime" the "breeziest and most radio-friendly" single from A Brief Inquiry into Online Relationships, favourably comparing it to Drake's "Passionfruit" (2017). She praised the upbeat groove, lyrical exploration of anxiety and balance of sonic experimentation with a continued focus on the album's core theme of relationships in an online world. Sargent felt the track represented a "very comfortable" midpoint between the band's penchant for musical experimentation and contemporary pop music, calling it "their new album's clearest mission statement yet". Stereogum writer Ryan Leas commended "TooTimeTooTimeTooTime" for successfully infusing contemporary pop music trends into the 1975's signature sound, opining the song "uses texting and hints of infidelity and jealousy to create an infectious, number-based hook". Conrad Duncan of Under the Radar highlighted the song as an example of the album's "countless moments of inventive vision", saying it "jettisons the band's usual verbosity for a sharp pop crossover". Similarly, Larry Fitzmaurice of Uproxx deemed it their global-pop breakthrough.

Dan Stubbs of NME said he would play "TooTimeTooTimeTooTime" "to death" and highlighted the myriad of musical elements in "TooTimeTooTimeTooTime". He also commented that despite not being as lyrically complex as "Love It If We Made It", the song is emblematic of Healy's writing style, which he described as "knowing, insecure, romantic, flawed, and cocky at the same time". In her review of A Brief Inquiry into Online Relationships for The Ringer, Lindsay Zoladz acclaimed the song for being able to "capture, so pithily, the surreal links between body and machine, technology and emotion, that now dictate ordinary life". She specifically called the couplet "She said that I should have liked it / I said that I only use it sometimes"–which references "liking" an Instagram post–one of her all-time favourite Healy lyrics. Shannon Cotton of Gigwise highlighted the same couplet, viewing it as a reference to the Instagram "generation" where "friendships are determined by who's liked your latest pre-night out mirror selfie rather than anything substantial or tangible". DIY writer Will Richards praised the "catchiness" of the chorus and "deliberately vacuous" lyrics, saying that the 1975 understand "the power of letting [everything] go for three-and-a-half minutes via a pop song – and on the face of it, a very silly pop song – that makes you feel on top of the fucking world".

Commercially, "TooTimeTooTimeTooTime" performed modestly on music charts worldwide. In the 1975's native United Kingdom, the song reached number 26 on the UK Singles Chart and number 29 in Scotland. Internationally, it peaked at number 29 in Ireland, number 17 on the Sweden Heatseeker chart and number 17 on the US Billboard Hot Rock & Alternative Songs chart. The song was later certified platinum in the United Kingdom by the British Phonographic Industry (BPI), denoting sales of over 600,000 units.

== Music video ==
In July 2018, the 1975 invited fans to apply to be featured in an upcoming music video being filmed in London. On 22 July, Healy tweeted: "I just spent the whole day shooting a video with our fans and I just want to say that I couldn't be more proud. You are all so weird and beautiful. It was one of the best days of my life, thank you". A vertically oriented music video for "TooTimeTooTimeTooTime" debuted via Spotify on 15 August 2018. On 29 August, the fullscreen version was released on the band's YouTube page. The video opens with individual fans calmly lip synching the song's lyrics against a colour-changing backdrop. Healy, dressed in an all-black tuxedo with blonde hair, gradually joins some of the fans with cameos including No Rome as the video progresses and the dancing becomes more eccentric. Towards the end of the video, Healy and the fans gather together and frantically dance as a group.

Antonio Harris of Soundigest opined that the music video for "TooTimeTooTimeTooTime" suited the song's technology-themed lyrics, saying: "The song is all about communications among the online age, and [t]he 1975's fan base represents this perfectly." Alessandra Rincón of Billboard praised the colourful backdrops of the visual. In her review of the video for Nylon, Taylor Bryant wrote: "[...] it's easy to forget how charming music videos can be when they just show people hanging out, having a good time, and enjoying being alive. Well, [the band] is here to remind you." Wandera Hussein of The Fader complimented the "cutesy" visual. Stereogum writer Tom Breihan said that a viewer's enjoyment of the video "depends entirely on whether or not [they] find Healy charming", adding: "You will not be shocked to discover that I like the video. It has energy and brightness, it's fun to watch, and it executes the all-important task of making [the viewer] like the song more."

== Credits and personnel ==
Credits adapted from A Brief Inquiry into Online Relationships album liner notes.

- Matthew Healy – composer, producer, keyboards, guitar, vocals
- George Daniel – composer, producer, programming, drums, keyboards, percussion, synthesizer
- Guendoline Rome Viray Gomez – composer, programming, drums, synthesizer, background vocals
- Ross MacDonald – bass guitar
- Jonathan Gilmore – recording engineer
- Robin Schmidt – mastering engineer
- Manny Marroquin – mixer

== Charts ==
Chart performance for "TooTimeTooTimeTooTime"
Chart (2018)	Peak position
Ireland (IRMA)	29
Scottish Singles Sales (Official Charts)	29
Sweden Heatseeker (Sverigetopplistan)	17
UK Singles (Official Charts)	26
US Hot Rock & Alternative Songs (Billboard)	17
Top 100 Venezuela (National-Report)	33

== Certifications ==
Certifications and sales for "TooTimeTooTimeTooTime"
Region	Certification	Certified units/sales
New Zealand (RMNZ)	Gold	15,000^{‡}
United Kingdom (BPI)	Platinum	600,000^{‡}
^{‡} Sales+streaming figures based on certification alone.

== See also ==
- The 1975 discography
- List of songs by Matty Healy
