= No Rome =

Filipino musician

- Born: Guendoline Rome Viray Gomez; 30 August 1995 (age 31); San Francisco del Monte, Metro Manila, Philippines
- Label: Dirty Hit

Guendoline Rome Viray Gomez (born 30 August 1995), better known by his stage name No Rome, is a London-based Filipino musician from San Francisco del Monte. His 2021 single "Spinning", which featured Charli XCX and The 1975, charted at No. 94 on the UK Singles Chart. Gomez also cowrote The 1975's 2018 single "TooTimeTooTimeTooTime", which charted at No. 26.

== Life and career ==
=== Early life ===
Guendoline Rome Viray Gomez grew up in the suburb of San Francisco del Monte within Quezon City, Metro Manila. His father was a former DJ and his mother a church singer, while his younger sister Gabriel performed under the name Aunt Robert and his older brother Zeon under the name U-Pistol, short for Ulzzang Pistol. He grew up listening to My Bloody Valentine and Slowdive, and later electronic artists such as Björk and Aphex Twin. Growing up, he became interested in visual art after taking pictures with his father's camera, and spent extended periods on Flickr and later Tumblr, on the grounds that its contents were annotated with information for further research; he was later inspired to start writing after reading books of poems by artists such as Frank O'Hara and Robert Frost.

"When I was just starting, many people discouraged me, saying, ‘No, Rome, not in music; try something else.’ That stuck in my mind."

— Gomez in October 2019

Gomez's first performances were as part of the band Rome and the Cats alongside his brother, who acted as his manager. He then adopted the stage name "No Rome", based on a common response to him stating that he was starting in the music industry, and with Zeon and Ethan Namoch founded Young Liquid Gang (YLG) in 2012, a collective of musicians, visual artists, photographers, managers, and graphic designers which ran until 2015. One of YLG's members, Leon Ordinario, met Gomez by chance at a McDonald's outside their college, and would later become the programmer and drummer for Gomez's live shows; another bandmate, Chris, would flash moving images on Gomez using a projector.

Gomez moved to London at the age of 18, after he was signed to Dirty Hit.

=== Early releases, RIP Indo Hisashi, and Crying in the Prettiest Places ===
In 2013, he released the double A-side single "Dance With Me" / "United We Are"", followed by the EP Fantasy, both on Number Line Records. In 2014, he released "Heaven", a song inspired by recent bereavements, and in 2015, he released "Know U" on Mermaid Avenue, about being ghosted by inopportune partners, and the EP Hurry Home & Rest on Number Line Records. The following year, fed up of carting his MIDI controllers around on buses, he took a job at a call center, staying in post for seven months, and used the proceeds to purchase a digital audio workstation, gear, and private transportation. In January 2017, he released "Blue Jeans", a song about misinterpretation of his lyrics, and the following month he released "Seventeen" on Ryan Hemsworth's Secret Songs label, a song about a friend's failed romance; Wave Racer would cover the song in June 2021.

Gomez then entered into correspondence with Samuel Burgess-Johnson and sent him his demos, who proceeded to share them with his flatmate Matty Healy, who invited him to London and signed him to his label Dirty Hit. In 2018, Healy and George Daniel produced Rome's third EP, RIP Indo Hisashi, which took its name from the Japanese painter Hisashi Indo, and featured "Narcissist", a collaboration with the 1975, who later adapted it for their own "TooTimeTooTimeTooTime", which charted at No. 26 on the UK Singles Chart. Healy and Daniel also produced Gomez's fourth EP, Crying in the Prettiest Places, the following year, which charted at No. 14 on the UK R&B Albums Chart. He joined The 1975 onstage for the “Narcissist” performance in the 2019 Coachella Valley Music and Arts Festival, marking him as the first Filipino act that started performing in the Philippines to perform onstage in the said festival.

=== "Spinning", It's All Smiles, and Blueboy Must Die ===
In January 2020, Gomez announced that he was working on Samantha's TV, a mixtape, which took its name from the character played by Scarlett Johansson in Her; following the COVID-19 pandemic in the Philippines, he was trapped in the country, having visited with the intention of performing at that year's Wanderland Music and Arts Festival. After spending time at his parents' house, he moved to an apartment in Subic. While there, he aborted the mixtape, and started afresh; he told the Line of Best Fit in December 2021 that he found the lockdown conducive, as previously he had been "ADD-ing all over the place" and unable to focus.

In 2021, he, Charli XCX and the 1975 released "Spinning", which charted at No. 94 on the UK Singles Chart in March 2021; the following month, Forbes listed him on their Forbes 30 Under 30 Asia 2021 list, and the month after that, he and Chase Atlantic featured on Elio's "Hurts 2 Hate Somebody", which appeared on her remix album, "Elio and Friends: The Remixes". Later that year, Daniel and BJ Burton coproduced Rome's album It's All Smiles, which he named ironically due to its sad lyrics, and which he promoted with a zine comprising photographs taken by Gomez.

In May 2023, Gomez featured on the Salute song "Run Away With You", which featured on their EP Shield. Later that month, he released "Brother", which was inspired by "Plantasia" by Mort Garson and Rachel McKibbens' "Letter From My Heart to My Brain", and in August 2023, he released "Deep Diving", a UK garage-inspired song also inspired by "Plantasia". On 8 September, he released the Kurisu-produced mixtape Blueboy Must Die, which had been delayed from 28 July 2023, and on 15 December 2023, he and Ocho the Bullet cowrote Josh Cullen's "Get Right", which Gomez also coproduced.

In February 2026, after not officially releasing music for three years, No Rome took to social media to confirm that he was at work on a second studio album. He shared an unreleased demo, 'Wut Am I Doin?', along with the update.

=== Critical reception ===
It's All Smiles received mixed reviews, and varying genre classifications, earning one out of five stars from the Guardian, four out of five stars from DIY Mag and a 7.1 from Pitchfork. The Guardian argued that Gomez's self-proclaimed genre, "shoegaze R&B," presented contradictory ideas about the role of vocals: Shoegaze is a genre in which "singers sink in quicksands of guitar", while R&B is a genre often dependent on the quality of the vocalist, and noted that his choice "to foreground his thin, trebly voice and treat it with endless effects [... owed] more to hyperpop than anything else." They also described the album's "A Place Where Nobody Knows" and "Everything" as chillwave, and described the album as a "hyperpop headache". Pitchfork described the range of vocal styles presented in the record as "chameleonic," and called It's All Smiles, "solid pop with an experimental slant" that was "gratifying" and "ambitious" when cast against its pop counterparts, but ultimately "too safe." DIY Mag cited a "clear desire to mess with pop convention."

== Personal life and influences ==
Gomez spent a period misdiagnosed with schizophrenia, for which he took antipsychotic medication; he later wrote the It's All Smiles album track "Secret Beach" about his experiences.

In a December 2021 interview with Vice, he stated that It's All Smiles had been influenced by My Bloody Valentine, Nujabes, and the Avalanches, and a March 2022 edition of Out of Print noted that his influences spanned the Deftones, jungle producer Goldie, and the light art pioneers Jenny Holzer and Nam June Paik, and that his "ultimate musical hero" was Kim Gordon.

== Discography ==
=== Studio albums ===
- It's All Smiles (2021)

=== Mixtapes ===
- Blueboy Must Die (2023)

=== Extended plays ===
- Fantasy (2013)
- Hurry Home & Rest (2015)
- RIP Indo Hisashi (2018)
- Crying in the Prettiest Places (2019)
- Some More Smiles (2022)

=== Singles ===
- "Dance with Me" / "United We Are" (2013)
- "Heaven" (2014)
- "Know U" (2015)
- "Seventeen" (2017)
- "Blue Jeans" (2017)
- "Do It Again" (2018)
- "Seventeen" (re-release, 2018)
- "Saint Laurent" (2018)
- "Cashmoney" (2019)
- "Pink" (2019)
- "Talk Nice" (2019)
- "Trust3000" (featuring Dijon) (2019)
- "Hurry Home" (featuring Beabadoobee and Jay Som) (2020)
- "1:45AM" (featuring Bearface) (2020)
- "Spinning" (with The 1975 and Charli XCX) (2021)
- "When She Comes Around" (2021)
- "I Want U" (2021)
- "Brother" (2023)
- "Deep Diving" (2023)

==== Featured singles ====
- "Hurts 2 Hate Somebody" (Elio featuring Chase Atlantic and No Rome) (2021)
- "Shoegazing" (Misogi featuring No Rome) (2023)
