= Politics of the United States =

- Coat of arms
- Polity type: United States federal government, a federal presidential republic
- Constitution: United States Constitution; March 4, 1789; 237 years ago

Legislative branch
- Name: Congress
- Type: Bicameral
- Meeting place: Capitol
- Upper house
- Name: Senate
- Presiding officer: JD Vance, Vice President & President of the Senate
- Appointer: Direct Election
- Lower house
- Name: House of Representatives
- Presiding officer: Mike Johnson, Speaker of the House of Representatives
- Appointer: First-past-the-post voting

Executive branch
- Head of state and government
- Title: President
- Currently: Donald Trump
- Appointer: Electoral College
- Cabinet
- Name: Cabinet of the United States
- Current cabinet: Second cabinet of Donald Trump
- Leader: President
- Deputy leader: Vice President
- Appointer: President
- Headquarters: White House
- Ministries: 15

Judicial branch
- Name: Federal judiciary of the United States
- Courts: Courts of the United States
- Supreme Court
- Chief judge: John Roberts
- Seat: Supreme Court Building

In the United States, politics functions within a framework of a constitutional federal republic with a presidential system. The three distinct branches share powers: Congress, which forms the legislative branch, a bicameral legislative body comprising the House of Representatives and the Senate; the executive branch, which is headed by the president of the United States, who serves as the country's head of state and government; and the judicial branch, composed of the Supreme Court and lower federal courts, and which exercises judicial power.

Each of the 50 individual state governments has the power to make laws within its jurisdiction that are not granted to the federal government nor denied to the states in the U.S. Constitution. Each state also has a constitution following the pattern of the federal constitution but differing in details. Each has three branches: an executive branch headed by a governor, a legislative body, and a judicial branch. At the local level, governments are found in counties or county-equivalents, and beneath them individual municipalities, county, townships, school districts, and special districts.

Officials are popularly elected at the federal, state and local levels, with the major exception being the president, who is instead elected indirectly by the people through the Electoral College. American politics is dominated by two parties which since the American Civil War have been the Democratic Party and the Republican Party, although other parties have run candidates. Since the mid-20th century, the Democratic Party has generally supported left-leaning policies, while the Republican Party has generally supported right-leaning ones. Both parties have no formal central organization at the national level that controls membership, elected officials or political policies; thus, each party has traditionally had factions and individuals that deviated from party positions. Almost all public officials in America are elected from single-member districts and win office by winning a plurality of votes cast (i.e. more than any other candidate, but not necessarily a majority). Suffrage is nearly universal for citizens 18 years of age and older, with the notable exception of registered felons in some states.

== Federal government ==
Flowchart of the U.S. federal political system

The United States is a constitutional federal republic, in which the president (the head of state and head of government), Congress, and judiciary share powers reserved to the national government, and the federal government shares sovereignty with the state governments.

The federal government is divided into three branches, as per the specific terms articulated in the U.S. Constitution:

- The executive branch is headed by the president and is independent of the legislature.
- Legislative power is vested in the two chambers of Congress: the Senate and the House of Representatives.
- The judicial branch (or judiciary), composed of the Supreme Court and lower federal courts, exercises judicial power. The judiciary's function is to interpret the United States Constitution and federal laws and regulations. This includes resolving disputes between the executive and legislative branches.

The federal government's layout is explained in the Constitution. Two political parties, the Democratic Party and the Republican Party, have dominated American politics since the American Civil War, although other parties have existed.

There are major differences between the political system of the United States and that of many other developed countries, including:

- an upper legislative house (the Senate), with far more power than is found in equivalent bodies in most other countries;
- a Supreme Court that also has a wider scope of power than is found in most countries;
- a separation of powers between the legislature and the executive; and
- a political landscape dominated by only two main parties. The United States is one of the world's only developed countries where all additional parties have minimal or nonexistent influence and almost no representation at the national and state level. Causes for this mainly focus on the plurality-based first-past-the-post voting system, used in most elections, which encourages strategic voting and discourages vote splitting. This also results in both major parties having multiple internal factions.

The federal entity created by the U.S. Constitution is the dominant feature of the American governmental system, as citizens are also subject to a state government and various units of local government (such as counties, municipalities, and special districts).

== State government ==
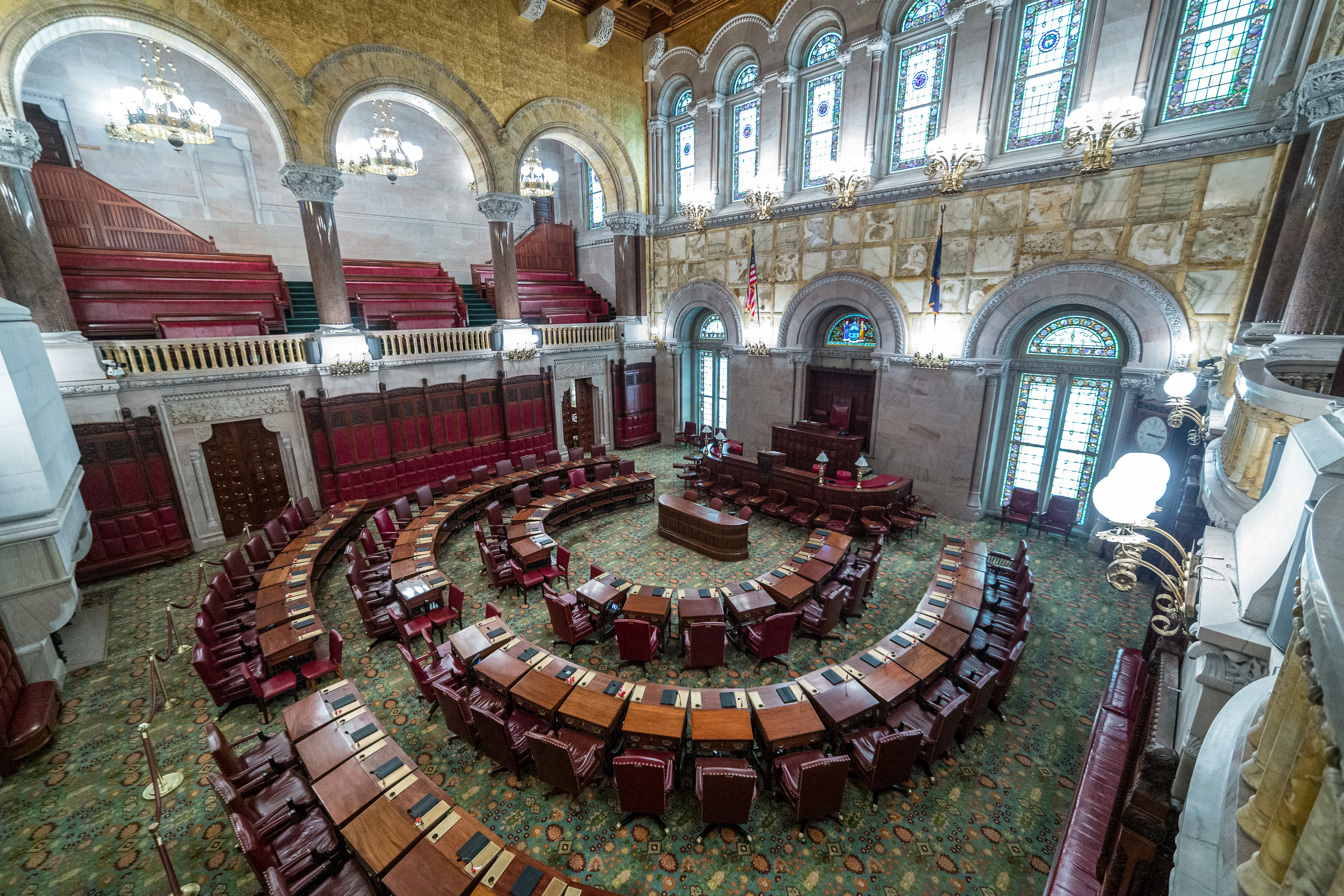
New York State Senate chamber

US state and territory governments (governor and legislature) by party control Democratic control Republican control NPP control Split control

US state and territorial legislatures by party control Democratic control Republican control NPP control Split control Non-partisan

State governments have the power to make laws on all subjects that are not granted to the federal government nor denied to the states in the U.S. Constitution. These include education, family law, contract law, and most crimes. Unlike the federal government, which only has those powers granted to it in the Constitution, a state government has inherent powers allowing it to act unless limited by a provision of the state or national constitution.

Like the federal government, state governments have three branches: executive, legislative, and judicial. The chief executive of a state is its popularly elected governor, who typically holds office for a four-year term (although in some states the term is two years). Except for Nebraska, which has unicameral legislature, all states have a bicameral legislature, with the upper house usually called the Senate and the lower house called the House of Representatives, the Assembly or something similar. In most states, senators serve four-year terms, and members of the lower house serve two-year terms.

The constitutions of the various states differ in some details but generally follow a pattern similar to that of the federal Constitution, including a statement of the rights of the people and a plan for organizing the government, and are generally more detailed.

At the state and local level, the process of initiatives and referendums allow citizens to place new legislation on a popular ballot, or to place legislation that has recently been passed by a legislature on a ballot for a popular vote. Initiatives and referendums, along with recall elections and popular primary elections, are signature reforms of the Progressive Era; they are written into several state constitutions, particularly in the Western states, but not found at the federal level.

== Local government ==
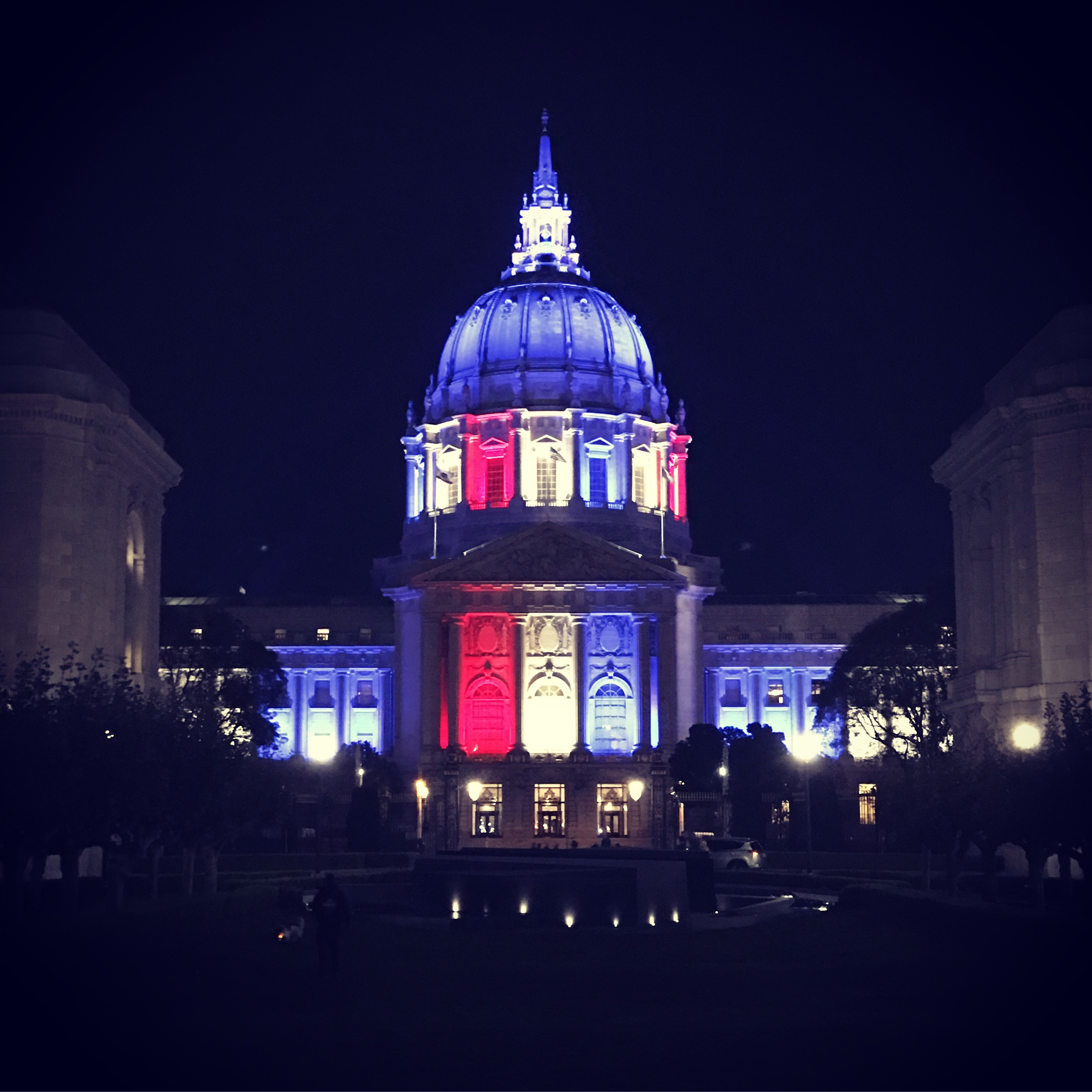
On Election Day on the first Tuesday in November, citizens all around the United States vote for political offices. (Shown is San Francisco City Hall commemorating the occasion.)

The United States Census Bureau conducts the Census of Governments every five years, categorizing four types of local governmental jurisdictions below state level:

1. County governments
2. Town or township governments
3. Municipal governments
4. Special-purpose local governments, including both school districts and other special districts

In 2022, there were 90,837 total local governments, including 3,031 counties, 19,491 municipalities, 16,214 townships, 12,546 school districts, and 39,555 other special districts. Local governments directly serve the needs of the people, providing everything from police and fire protection to sanitary codes, health regulations, education, public transportation, and housing. Typically local elections are nonpartisan — local activists suspend their party affiliations when campaigning and governing.

=== County government ===
The county is the administrative subdivision of the state, authorized by state constitutions and statutes. The county equivalents in Louisiana are called parishes, while those in Alaska are called boroughs.

The specific governmental powers of counties vary widely between the states. For example, in New England, they are primarily used as judicial districts. In other states, counties have broad powers in housing, education, transportation and recreation. County government has been eliminated throughout Connecticut, Rhode Island, and in parts of Massachusetts; while the Unorganized Borough area of Alaska (which makes up about a half of the area of the state) does not operate under a county-level government at all. In areas that do not have any county governmental function and are simply a division of land, services are provided either by lower level townships or municipalities, or the state.

Counties may contain a number of cities, towns, villages, or hamlets. Some cities—including Philadelphia, Honolulu, San Francisco, Nashville, and Denver—are consolidated city-counties, where the municipality and the county have been merged into a unified, coterminous jurisdiction—that is to say, these counties consist in their entirety of a single municipality whose city government also operates as the county government. Some counties, such as Arlington County, Virginia, do not have any additional subdivisions. Some states contain independent cities that are not part of any county; although it may still function as if it was a consolidated city-county, an independent city was legally separated from any county. Some municipalities are in multiple counties; New York City is uniquely partitioned into five boroughs that are each coterminous with a county.

In most U.S. counties, one town or city is designated as the county seat, and this is where the county government offices are located and where the board of commissioners or supervisors meets. In small counties, boards are chosen by the county; in the larger ones, supervisors represent separate districts or townships. The board collects taxes for state and local governments; borrows and appropriates money; fixes the salaries of county employees; supervises elections; builds and maintains highways and bridges; and administers national, state, and county welfare programs. In very small counties, the executive and legislative power may lie entirely with a sole commissioner, who is assisted by boards to supervise taxes and elections.

=== Town or township governments ===
Town or township governments are organized local governments authorized in the state constitutions and statutes of 20 Northeastern and Midwestern states, established as minor civil divisions to provide general government for a geographic subdivision of a county where there is no municipality. In New York, Wisconsin and New England, these county subdivisions are called towns.

In many other states, the term town does not have any specific meaning; it is simply an informal term applied to populated places (both incorporated and unincorporated municipalities). Moreover, in some states, the term town is equivalent to how civil townships are used in other states.

Like counties, the specific responsibilities to townships vary based on each state. Many states grant townships some governmental powers, making them civil townships, either independently or as a part of the county government. In others, survey townships are non-governmental. Towns in the six New England states and townships in New Jersey and Pennsylvania are included in this category by the Census Bureau, despite the fact that they are legally municipal corporations, since their structure has no necessary relation to concentration of population, which is typical of municipalities elsewhere in the United States. In particular, towns in New England have considerably more power than most townships elsewhere and often function as legally equivalent to cities, typically exercising the full range of powers that are divided between counties, townships, and cities in other states.

Township functions are generally overseen by a governing board, whose name also varies from state to state.

=== Municipal governments ===
Municipal governments are organized local governments authorized in state constitutions and statutes, established to provide general government for a defined area, generally corresponding to a population center rather than one of a set of areas into which a county is divided. The category includes those governments designated as cities, boroughs (except in Alaska), towns (except in Minnesota and Wisconsin), and villages. This concept corresponds roughly to the "incorporated places" that are recognized in by the U.S. Census Bureau, although the Census Bureau excludes New England towns from their statistics for this category, and the count of municipal governments excludes places that are governmentally inactive.

About 28 percent of Americans live in cities of 100,000 or more population. Types of city governments vary widely across the nation. Almost all have a central council, elected by the voters, and an executive officer, assisted by various department heads, to manage the city's affairs. Cities in the West and South usually have nonpartisan local politics.

There are three general types of municipal government: the mayor-council, the commission, and the council-manager. These are the pure forms; many cities have developed a combination of two or three of them.

==== Mayor-council government ====
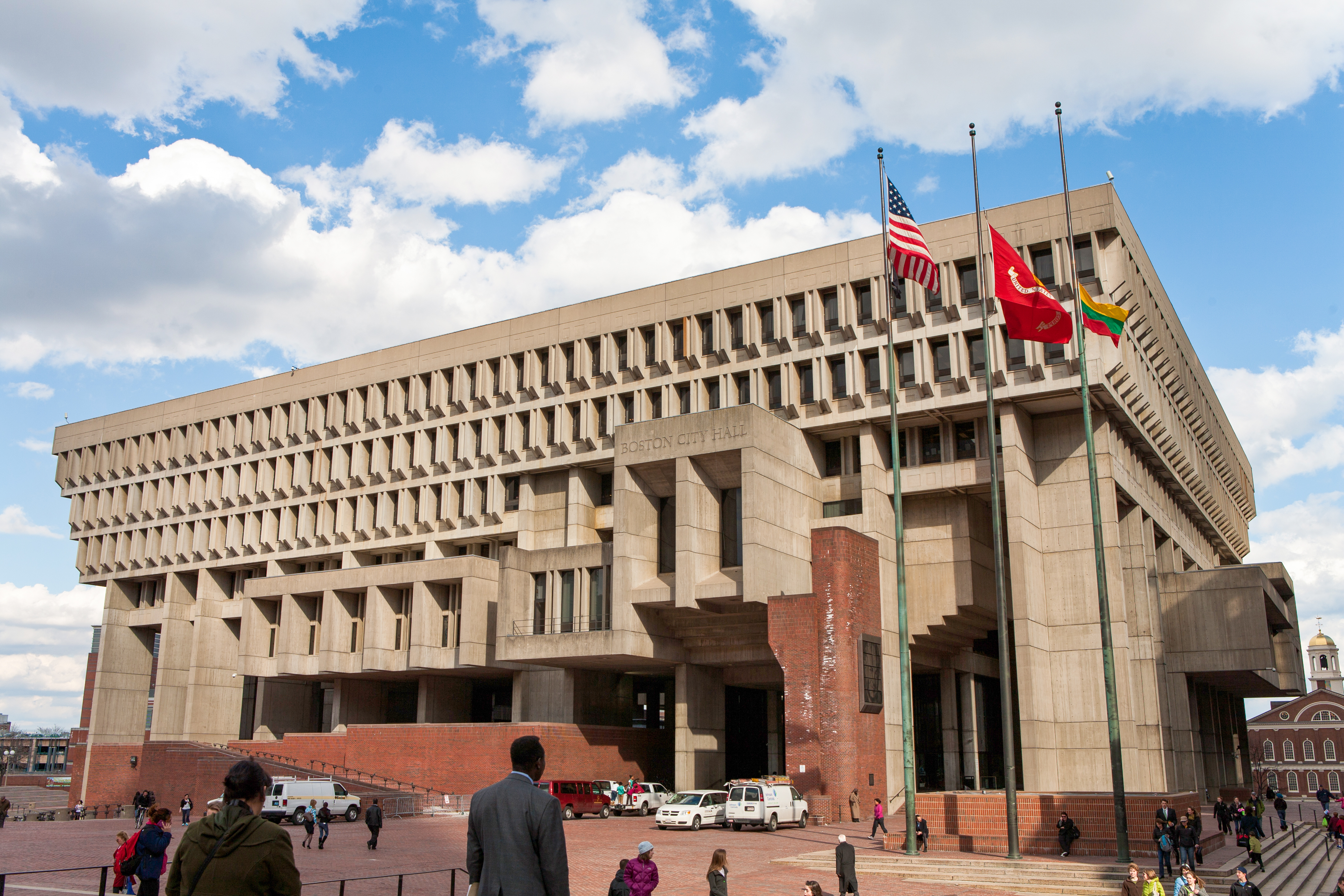
The seat of the mayor of Boston is Boston City Hall. Boston has a mayor–council government.

This is the oldest form of city government in the United States and, until the beginning of the 20th century, was used by nearly all American cities. Its structure is like that of the state and national governments, with an elected mayor as chief of the executive branch and an elected council that represents the various neighborhoods forming the legislative branch. The mayor appoints heads of city departments and other officials (sometimes with the approval of the council), has the power to veto over ordinances (the laws of the city), and often is responsible for preparing the city's budget. The council passes city ordinances, sets the tax rate on property, and apportions money among the various city departments. As cities have expanded, council seats have generally come to represent more than one neighborhood.

==== Commission ====
This combines both the legislative and executive functions in one group of officials, usually three or more in number, elected city-wide. Each commissioner supervises the work of one or more city departments. Commissioners also set policies and rules by which the city is operated. One is named chairperson of the body and is often called the mayor, although their power is equivalent to that of the other commissioners.

==== Council-manager ====
The city manager is a response to the increasing complexity of urban problems that need management ability not often possessed by elected public officials. The answer has been to entrust most of the executive powers, including law enforcement and provision of services, to a highly trained and experienced professional city manager.

The council-manager plan has been adopted by a large number of cities. Under this plan, a small, elected council makes the city ordinances and sets policy, but hires a paid administrator, also called a city manager, to carry out its decisions. The manager draws up the city budget and supervises most of the departments. Usually, there is no set term; the manager serves as long as the council is satisfied with their work.

=== Unincorporated areas ===
Some states contain unincorporated areas, which are areas of land not governed by any local authorities below that at the county level. Residents of unincorporated areas only need to pay taxes to the county, state and federal governments as opposed to the municipal government as well. A notable example of this is Paradise, Nevada, an unincorporated area where many of the casinos commonly associated with Las Vegas are situated.

=== Special-purpose local governments ===
In addition to general-purpose government entities legislating at the state, county, and city level, special-purpose areas may exist as well, provide one or more specific services that are not being supplied by other existing governments. School districts are organized local entities providing public elementary and secondary education which, under state law, have sufficient administrative and fiscal autonomy to qualify as separate governments.

Special districts are authorized by state law to provide designated functions as established in the district's charter or other founding document, and with sufficient administrative and fiscal autonomy to qualify as separate governments; known by a variety of titles, including districts, authorities, boards, commissions, etc., as specified in the enabling state legislation.

== Unincorporated territories ==
The United States possesses a number of unincorporated territories, including 16 island territories across the globe. These are areas of land which are not under the jurisdiction of any state, and do not have a government established by Congress through an organic act. Citizens of these territories can vote for members of their own local governments, and some can also elect representatives to serve in Congress—though they only have observer status. The unincorporated territories of the U.S. include the permanently inhabited territories of American Samoa, Guam, the Northern Mariana Islands, Puerto Rico, and the U.S. Virgin Islands; as well as minor outlying islands such as Baker Island, Howland Island, Jarvis Island, Johnston Atoll, Kingman Reef, Midway Atoll, Navassa Island, Palmyra Atoll, Wake Island, and others. American Samoa is the only territory with a native resident population and is governed by a local authority. Despite the fact that an organic act was not passed in Congress, American Samoa established its own constitution in 1967, and has self governed ever since. Seeking statehood or independence is often debated in US territories, such as in Puerto Rico, but even if referendums on these issues are held, congressional approval is needed for changes in status to take place.

The citizenship status of residents in US unincorporated territories has caused concern for their ability to influence and participate in the politics of the United States. In recent decades, the Supreme Court has established voting as a fundamental right of US citizens, even though residents of territories do not hold full voting rights. Despite this, residents must still abide by federal laws that they cannot equitably influence, as well as register for the national Selective Service System, which has led some scholars to argue that residents of territories are essentially second-class citizens. The legal justifications for these discrepancies stem from the Insular Cases, which were a series of 1901 Supreme Court cases that some consider to be reflective of imperialism and racist views held in the United States. Unequal access to political participation in US territories has also been criticized for affecting US citizens who move to territories, as such an action requires forfeiting the full voting rights that they would have held in the 50 states.

== Elections ==
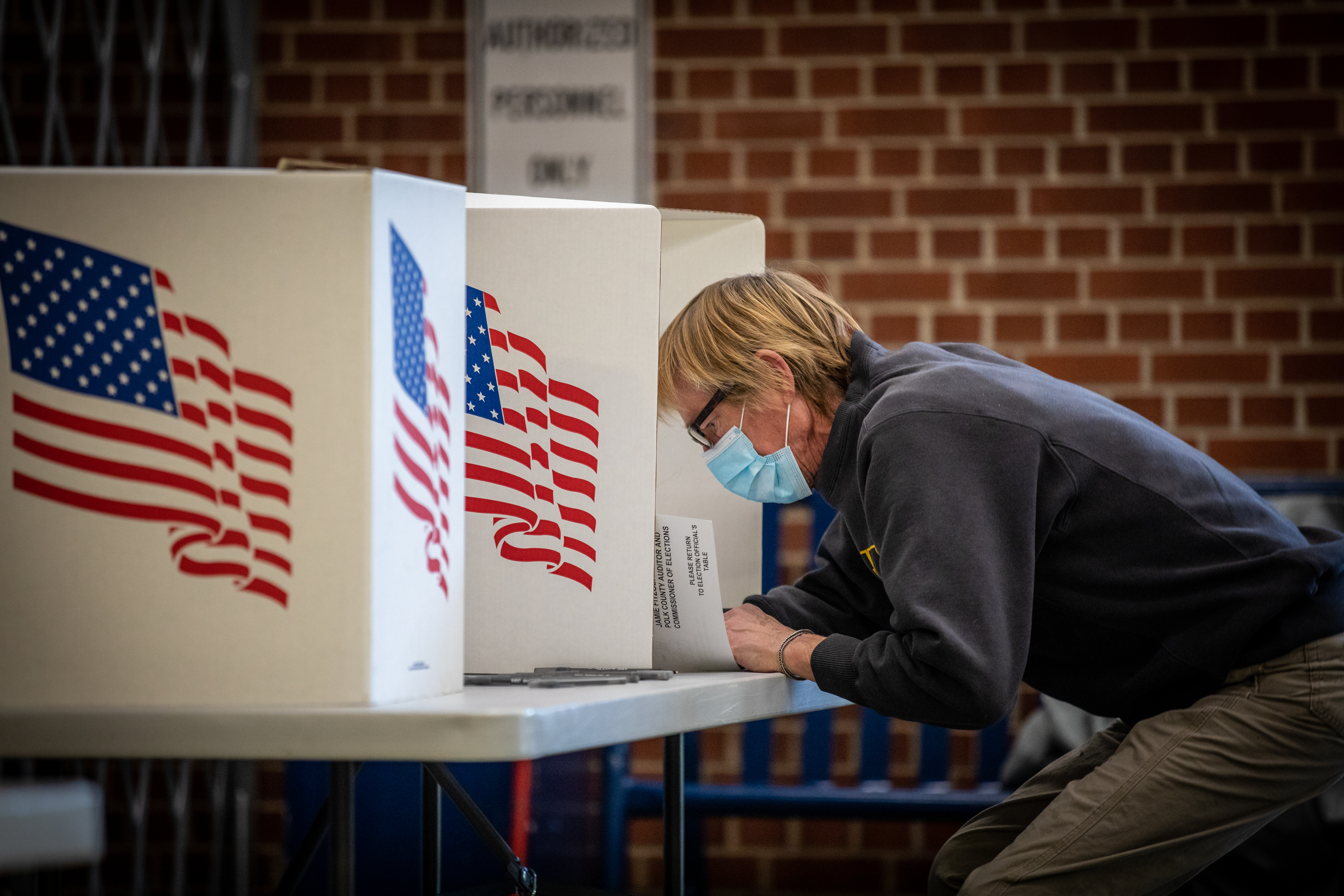
Voters cast ballots for the 2020 elections at Roosevelt High School in Des Moines, Iowa.

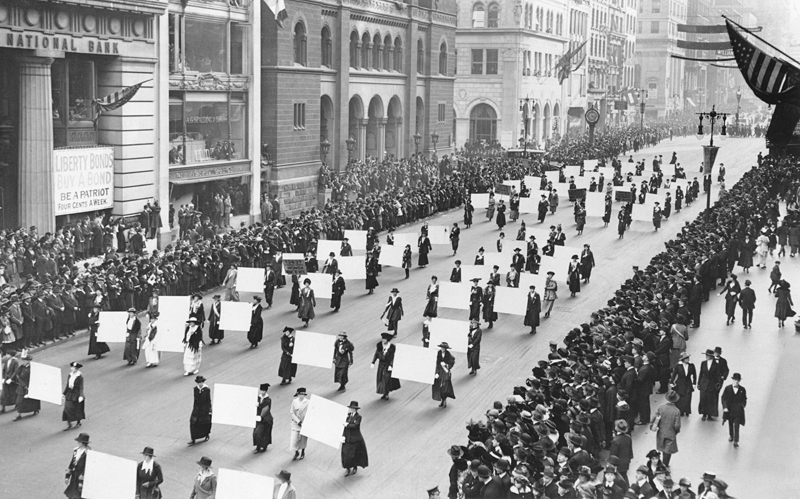
Women's suffragists parade in New York City in 1917, carrying placards with the signatures of more than a million women

As in the United Kingdom and in other similar parliamentary systems, in the U.S. Americans eligible to vote, vote for an individual candidate (there are sometimes exceptions in local government elections) (Note: Such as in elections of members of boards where voters are asked to select more than one candidate for an office; and in those few but growing number of areas where ranked choice is used in the United States) and not a party list. The U.S. government being a federal government, officials are elected at the federal (national), state and local levels. All members of Congress, and the offices at the state and local levels are directly elected, but the president is elected indirectly, by an Electoral College whose electors represent their state and are elected by popular vote. (Before the Seventeenth Amendment was passed, Senators were also elected indirectly, by state legislatures.) These presidential electors were originally expected to exercise their own judgement. In modern practice, though, the electors are chosen by their party and pledged to vote for that party's presidential candidate (in rare occurrences they may violate their pledge, becoming a faithless elector).

Both federal and state laws regulate elections. The United States Constitution defines (to a basic extent) how federal elections are held, in Article One and Article Two and various amendments. State law regulates most aspects of electoral law, including primaries, the eligibility of voters (beyond the basic constitutional definition), the running of each state's electoral college, and the running of state and local elections.

=== Suffrage ===
Who has the right to vote in the United States is regulated by the Constitution and federal and state laws. Suffrage is nearly universal for citizens 18 years of age and older. Voting rights are sometimes restricted as a result of felony conviction, depending on the state.

The District, and other U.S. holdings like Puerto Rico and Guam, do not have the right to choose any political figure outside their respective areas and can only elect a non-voting delegate to serve in the House of Representatives. All states and the District of Columbia contribute to the electoral vote for president.

=== Campaign finance ===
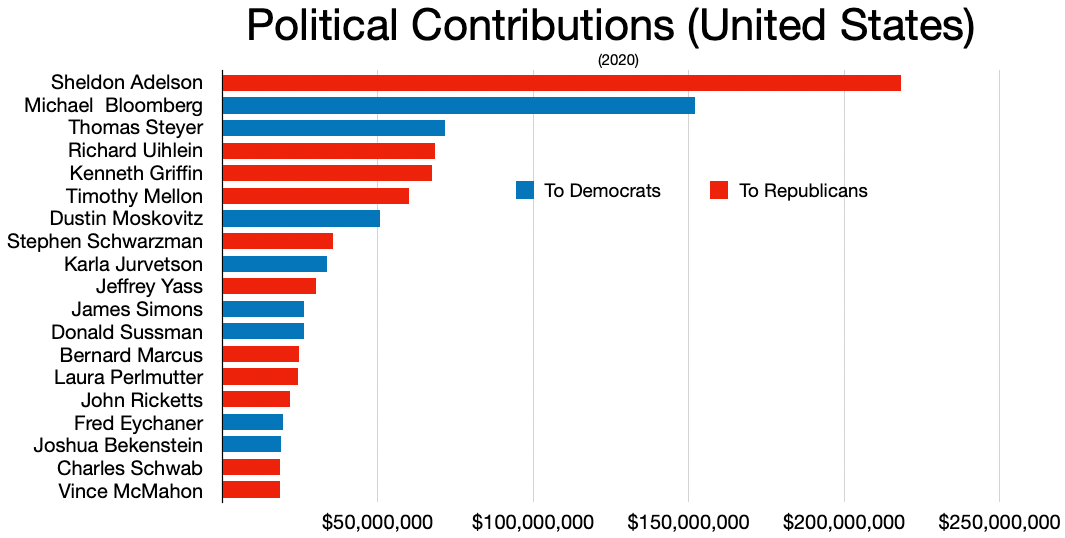
Political donations by major donors in the US 2020 elections

Campaign finance can be very difficult to raise by appeals to a mass base, although appeals for small donations over the Internet have been successful. Opponents of campaign finance laws allege they interfere with the First Amendment's guarantee of free speech. Even when laws are upheld, the complication of compliance with the First Amendment requires careful and cautious drafting of legislation, leading to laws that are still fairly limited in scope, especially in comparison to those of other developed democracies such as the United Kingdom, France or Canada.

== Political parties, pressure groups ==
=== Political parties ===
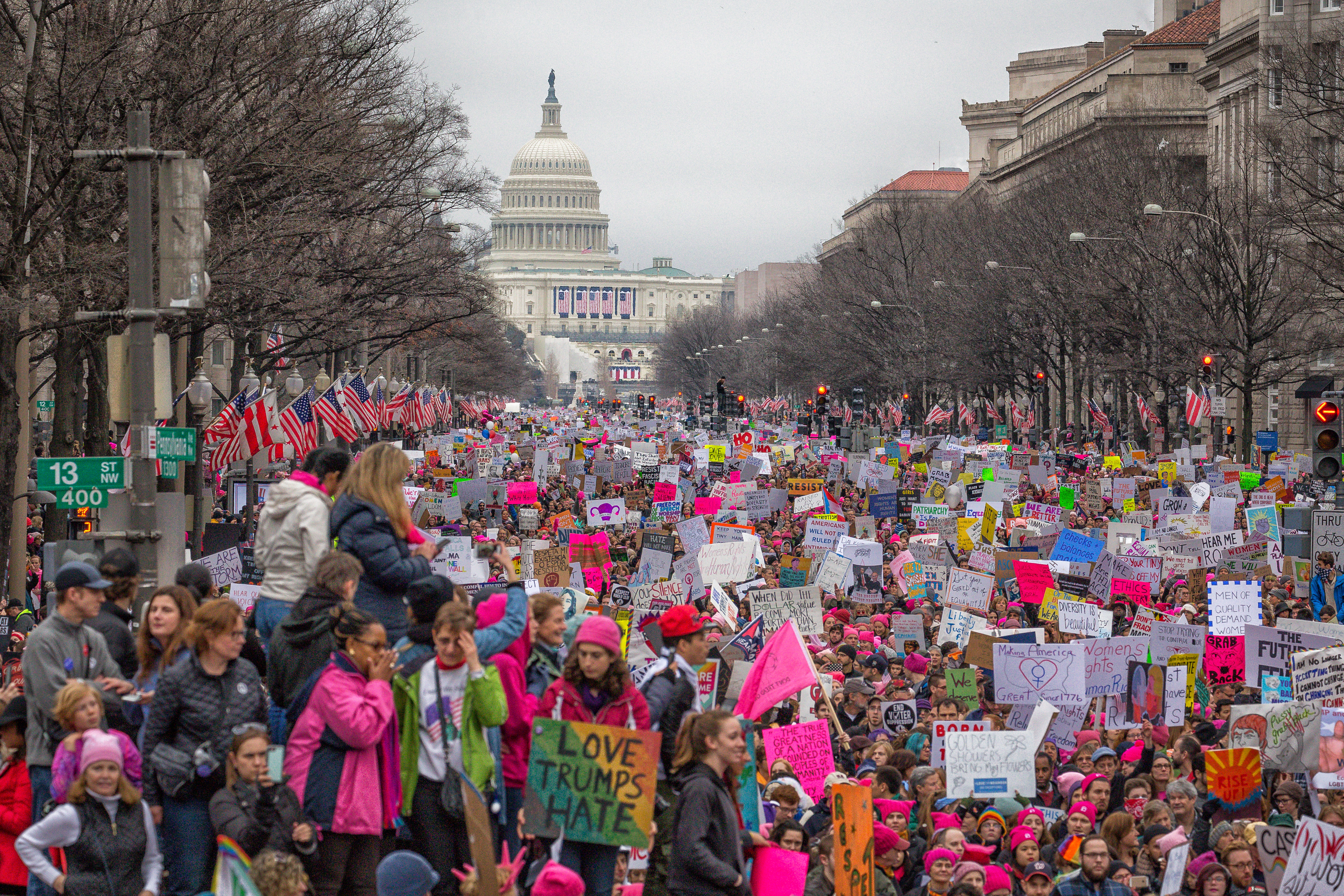
The 2017 Women's March in Washington, D.C., protested the 2016 election of President Donald Trump

Background

The United States Constitution never formally addressed the issue of political parties, primarily because the Founding Fathers opposed them. Nevertheless, parties—specifically, two competing parties in a "two-party system"—have been a fundamental part of American politics since shortly after George Washington's presidency.

In partisan elections, candidates are nominated by a political party or seek public office as independents. Each state has significant discretion in deciding how candidates are nominated and thus eligible to appear on a given election ballot. Major party candidates are typically formally chosen in a party primary or convention, whereas candidates from minor parties and Independent candidates must complete a petitioning process.

The current two-party system in the United States is made up of the Democratic Party and the Republican Party. These two parties have won every United States presidential election since 1852 and have controlled the United States Congress since at least 1856. From time to time, a third party, such as the Green and Libertarian Parties, has achieved some minor representation at the national and state levels.

Since the Great Depression and the New Deal, and increasingly since the 1960s, the Democratic Party has generally positioned itself as a center-left party, while the Republican Party has generally positioned itself as right-wing; there are other factions within each.

=== Party organization ===
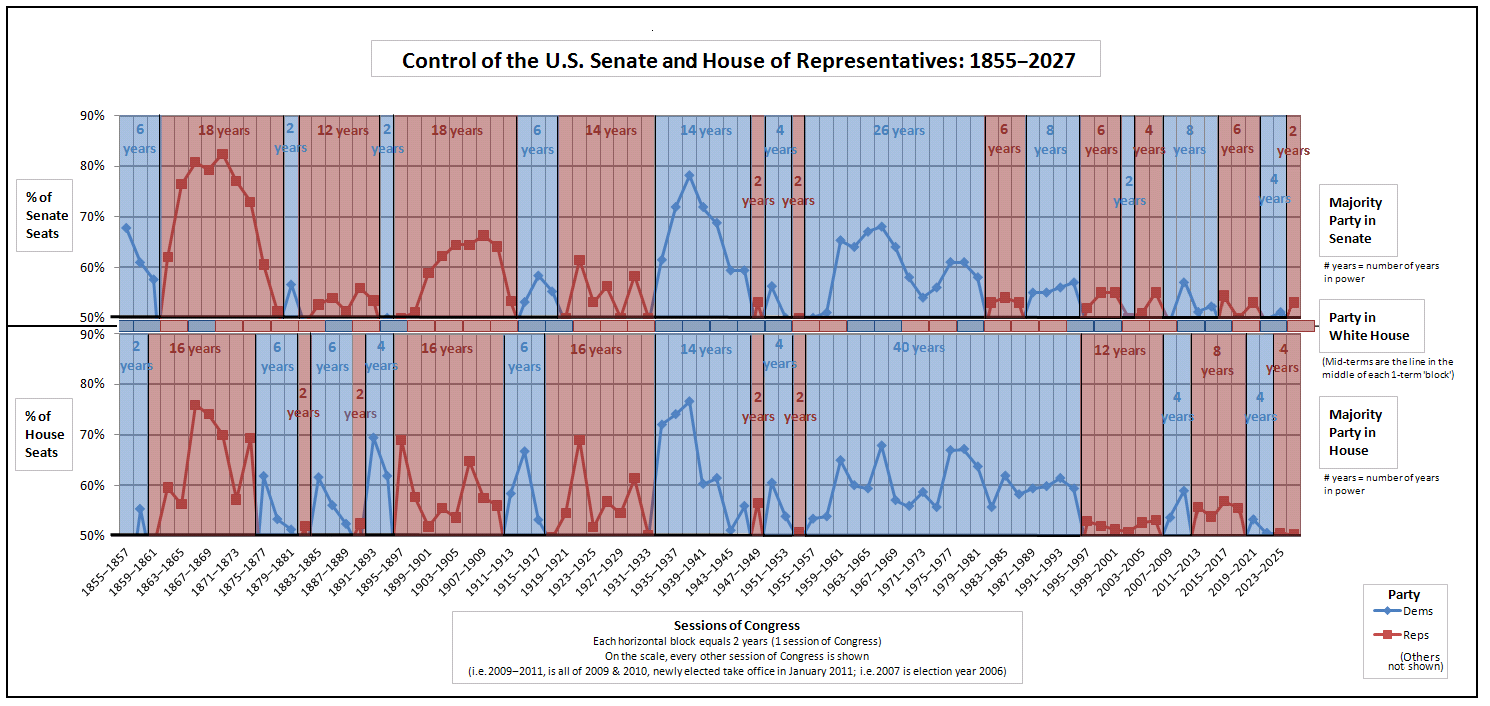
Control of the Senate, Presidency, and House since 1855, with blue for Democrats and red for Republicans. Any column where all three sections show the same color is a government trifecta; the other periods are divided government.

Unlike in many other countries, the major political parties in America have no strong central organization that determines party positions and policies, rewards loyal members and officials, or expels rebels. A party committee or convention may endorse a candidate for office, but deciding who will be the party's candidate in the general election is usually done in primaries open to voters who register as Democrats or Republicans. Furthermore, elected officials who fail to "toe the party line" because of constituent opposition said line and "cross the aisle" to vote with the opposition have (relatively) little to fear from their party.

Parties have state or federal committees that act as hubs for fundraising and campaigning (see Democratic National Committee and Republican National Committee) and separate campaign committees that work to elect candidates at a specific level but do not direct candidates or their campaigns. In presidential elections, the party's candidate serves as the de facto party leader, whose popularity or lack thereof helps or hinders candidates further down the ballot. Midterm elections are usually considered a referendum on the sitting president's performance.

Some (e.g., Lee Drutman and Daniel J. Hopkins before 2018) argue that, in the 21st century, along with becoming overtly partisan, American politics has become overly focused on national issues and "nationalized" that even local offices, formerly dealing with local matters, now often mention the presidential election.

==== Two-party system ====
"Third" political parties have appeared from time to time in American history but seldom lasted more than a decade. They have sometimes been the vehicle of an individual (Theodore Roosevelt's "Bull Moose" party, Ross Perot's Reform Party); had considerable strength in particular regions (Socialist Party, the Farmer-Labor Party, Wisconsin Progressive Party, Conservative Party of New York State, (Note: In 1970 a candidate of the Conservative Party of New York State (James L. Buckley) defeated the Democratic and Republican party candidates for U.S. Senate.) and the Populist Party); or continued to run candidates for office to publicize some issue despite seldom winning even local elections (Libertarian Party, Natural Law Party, Peace and Freedom Party).

Factors reinforcing the two-party system include:

- The traditional American electoral format of single-member districts where the candidate with the most votes wins (known as the "first-past-the-post" system), which according to Duverger's law favors the two-party system. This is in contrast to multi-seat electoral districts (Note: not to be confused with the American systems of having two senators representing each state, since the senator's elections in each state are staggered and do not run at the same time.) and proportional representation found in some other democracies.
- The 19th-century innovation of printing "party tickets" to pass out to prospective voters to cast in ballot boxes (originally, voters went to the polls and publicly stated which candidate they supported) "consolidated the power of the major parties".
- Printed party "tickets" (ballots) were eventually replaced by uniform ballots provided by the state when states began to adopt the Australian Secret Ballot Method. This gave state legislatures—dominated by Democrats and Republicans—the opportunity to hinder new rising parties with ballot access laws requiring a large number of petition signatures from citizens and giving the petitioners a short amount of time to gather the signatures.

=== Political pressure groups ===
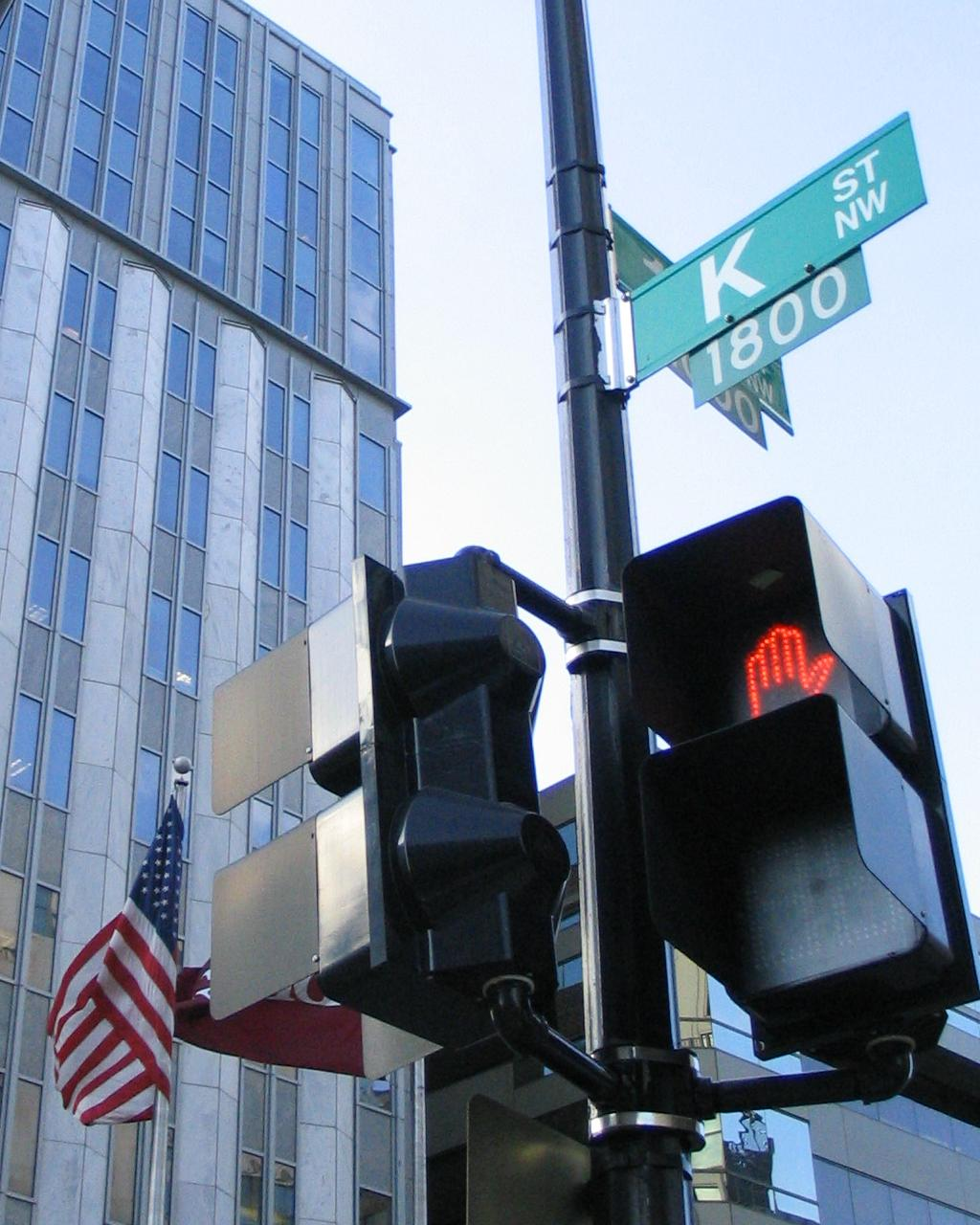
K Street in Washington, D.C., has become a metonym for the American lobbying industry.

Special-interest groups advocate the cause of their specific constituency. Business organizations, for example, will favor low corporate taxes and restrictions on the right to strike, whereas labor unions will support minimum wage legislation and protection for collective bargaining. Other private interest groups, such as churches and ethnic groups, are more concerned about broader policy issues affecting their organizations or beliefs.

One type of private interest group that has grown in number and influence in recent years is the political action committee or PAC. These are independent groups organized around a single issue or set of issues, which contribute money to political campaigns for United States Congress or the presidency. PACs are limited in the amounts they can contribute directly to candidates in federal elections. There are no restrictions on the amounts PACs can spend independently to advocate a point of view or to urge the election of candidates to office. As of 2008, 4,292 PACs were operating in the U.S.

The number of interest groups has mushroomed, with more and more of them operating offices in Washington, D.C., and representing themselves directly to Congress and federal agencies. Many organizations that keep an eye on Washington seek financial and moral support from ordinary citizens. Since many of them focus on a narrow set of concerns or even on a single issue, and often a single issue of enormous emotional weight, they compete with the parties for citizens' dollars, time, and passion.

In 2024, lobbyist groups spent a record $4.4 billion lobbying federal lawmakers, who are required to raise large amounts of money, especially on election years, with average winning budget being $2.7 million for the House of Representatives and $26.5 million for Senate. Candidates running for office are rewarded with funding if they align their regulatory views with those of powerful special interest groups. As a result, elected officials spend disproportionate amount of effort satisfying interests of wealthy lobbyist groups as opposed to serving their constituents, ordinary citizens.

A survey of members of the American Economic Association (i.e., the Association of Professional Economists) found the vast majority—regardless of political affiliation—felt the prevalence and influence of special interest groups in the political process led to benefits for the special interest groups and politicians at the expense of society as a whole.

==== Religious groups ====
Despite the First Amendment of the constitution's Establishment Clause ("Congress shall make no law respecting an establishment of religion ..."), for historical and demographic reasons, religious groups (primarily Christian groups) have frequently become political pressure groups and they have also become parts of political coalitions. In recent decades, conservative evangelicals have been particularly active within the broader Republican Party. This influence has often translated into the passing of laws related to morality and personal conduct. State alcohol and gambling laws, for example, are more restrictive in states with a higher percentage of conservative Christians.

== History, development and evolution ==
=== American political culture ===
==== Colonial origins ====
The American political culture is rooted in the colonial experience and the American Revolution. The colonies were unique within the European world for their (relatively) widespread suffrage which was granted to white male property owners, and the relative power and activity of the elected bodies which they could vote for. These dealt with land grants, commercial subsidies, taxation, the oversight of roads, poor relief, taverns, and schools. Courts, (private lawsuits were very common) also provided Americans with experience in public affairs and law, and gave interest groups such as merchants, landlords, petty farmers, artisans, Anglicans, Presbyterians, Quakers, Germans, Scotch Irish, Yankees, Yorkers, etc. control over matters left to the royal court, aristocratic families and the established church in Great Britain. Finally, Americans were interested in the political values of Republicanism, which celebrated equal rights, civic virtue, and abhorred corruption, luxury, and aristocracy.

==== Concepts of the Founding Fathers ====
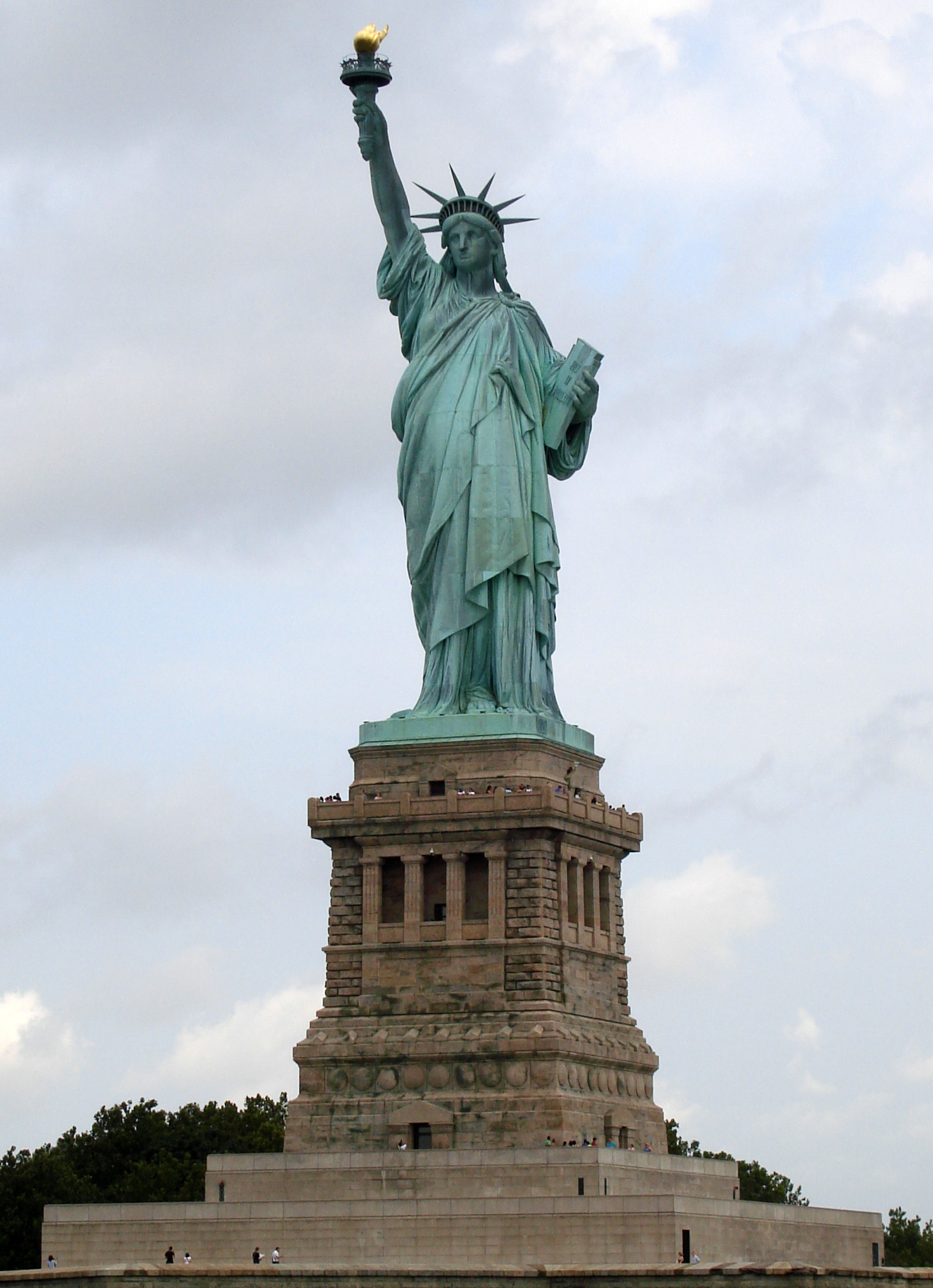
The Statue of Liberty, a symbol of American freedom and openness to immigration

Two pivotal political ideas in the establishment of the United States were Republicanism and classical liberalism. Central documents of American thought include: the Declaration of Independence (1776), the Constitution (1787), the Federalist and Anti-Federalist Papers (1787–1790s), the Bill of Rights (1791), and Lincoln's "Gettysburg Address" (1863).

Among the core tenets were:

- Consent of the governed: the authority and legitimacy of the government is dependent upon the assent of the people as expressed in free and fair elections
- Civic duty/"Positive liberty"/"republican virtue": the responsibility to understand and support the government, participate in elections, pay taxes, oppose political corruption, and perform military service.
- Democracy: government answerable to citizens, who may change who represents them through elections.
- Equality before the law: laws that attach no special privilege to any citizen and hold government officials subject just as any other person.
- Freedom of religion: government that neither supports nor suppresses any or all religion.
- Freedom of speech: government that restricts neither through law nor action the non-violent speech of a citizen; a marketplace of ideas.

==== Post–World War II ====
At the time of the United States' founding, the economy was predominantly one of agriculture and small private businesses, and state governments left welfare issues to private or local initiative. As in the UK and other industrialized countries, laissez-faire ideology was largely discredited during the Great Depression. Between the 1930s and 1970s, fiscal policy was characterized by the Keynesian consensus. After the "Reagan revolution" in the early 1980s, laissez-faire ideology once more became a powerful force in American politics. While the American welfare state expanded more than threefold after WWII, it held at 20% of GDP from the late 1970s to late 1980s. When compared to Europe, America's political culture is more conservative and religious. In the 21st century, modern American liberalism and modern American conservatism are engaged in a continuous political battle, characterized by what The Economist describes as "greater divisiveness [and] close, but bitterly fought elections." Since 2016, the United States has been recognized as a flawed democracy in the Democracy Index by the Economist Intelligence Unit, partially due to increased political polarization. According to the V-Dem Democracy indices the United States was in 2023 the 27th most electoral democratic country and 3rd most participatory democracy in the world.

In foreign affairs, the United States generally pursued a noninterventionist policy of "avoiding foreign entanglements" before World War II. After the war, when America became a superpower, for many decades the country embraced internationalism, seeking allies to contain Communism and foster economic cooperation.

=== Development and evolution of political parties ===
==== Background ====
The United States Constitution never formally addressed the issue of political parties, primarily because the Founding Fathers—Alexander Hamilton, James Madison, George Washington—opposed them as domestic political factions leading to domestic conflict and stagnation.

Nevertheless, the beginnings of the American two-party system emerged from Washington's immediate circle of advisers, including Hamilton and Madison. By the 1790s, different views of the new country's proper course had already developed, with those holding the same views banding together. The followers of Alexander Hamilton (the "Federalist") favored a strong central government that would support the interests of commerce and industry. The followers of Thomas Jefferson, ("Democratic-Republicans") preferred a decentralized agrarian republic.

By 1828, the Federalists had disappeared as an organization, replaced first by the National Republican Party and then by the Whigs, while the Democratic Republicans evolved into the Democrats led by Andrew Jackson, and known for celebrating "the common (white) man" and the expansion of suffrage to most of them.

In the 1850s, it was the Whigs' turn to disappear, undone by the issue of whether slavery should be allowed to expand into the country's new territories in the West. The Whigs were eventually replaced by the Republican Party which opposed slavery expansion and whose first successful candidate for the presidency was Abraham Lincoln.

==== Democratic and Republican ====
In the 150+ years since the Democratic and Republican parties have been America's two major parties, though their policies, base of support and relative strength have changed considerably.

Some eras in American politics include:

- Reconstruction era (1865–1877) and Gilded Age (1870s–1900s). After the defeat of the Confederacy, the Republican Party, associated with the successful military defense of the Union and often known as "the Grand Old Party", became the dominant party in America. The Democrats were dominant in the "Solid South" (i.e. solidly Democratic) where "repressive legislation and physical intimidation" of Jim Crow prevented the "newly enfranchised African Americans from voting". They celebrated "state's rights", a key principle of segregationists. Nationwide democrats supported cheap-money, and opposed banking and tariffs. Another element in its coalition were mostly urban Catholics.
- The Progressive Era (1896–1917). Progressive programs —municipal reforms, civil service reform, corrupt practices acts, and presidential primaries to replace the power of politicians at national conventions—strove to clean up politics, revitalize democracy, bringing to bear scientific solutions to social problems. Progressive leaders included Republicans Theodore Roosevelt, Robert M. La Follette, and Charles Evans Hughes; Democrats William Jennings Bryan, Woodrow Wilson, and Al Smith.
- The New Deal (1933–1938). These programs of Democratic president Franklin D. Roosevelt designed to deal with the disruption and suffering of the Great Depression — raising of the minimum wage, the establishment of the Social Security and other federal services — created a dramatic political shift in America. Roosevelt "forged a broad coalition—including small farmers, Northern city dwellers, organized labor, European immigrants, liberals, intellectuals, and reformers". The Democratic party became the dominant party—retaining the presidency until 1952 and controlling both houses of Congress for most of the period until the mid-1990s.
- The Break up of New Deal coalition. The Civil Rights Act of 1964 and Voting Rights Act of 1965—driven by Democratic president Lyndon B. Johnson—began the breaking off of the white segregationist Solid South from the Democratic party. Richard M. Nixon's "Southern strategy" began the process of winning white Southerners away to the G.O.P., and within a few decades created a solidly Republican south. Republican conservatives became victorious with the 1980 victory of Ronald Reagan, who campaigned on a theme of smaller government, free trade and tax cuts. These would stimulate economic growth which would then "trickle down" to the middle and lower classes (who might not benefit initially from these policies). The Republican party was now said to rest on "three legs" of Christian right/Social conservatism, fiscal conservatism/small government, and strong anti-communist military policy.

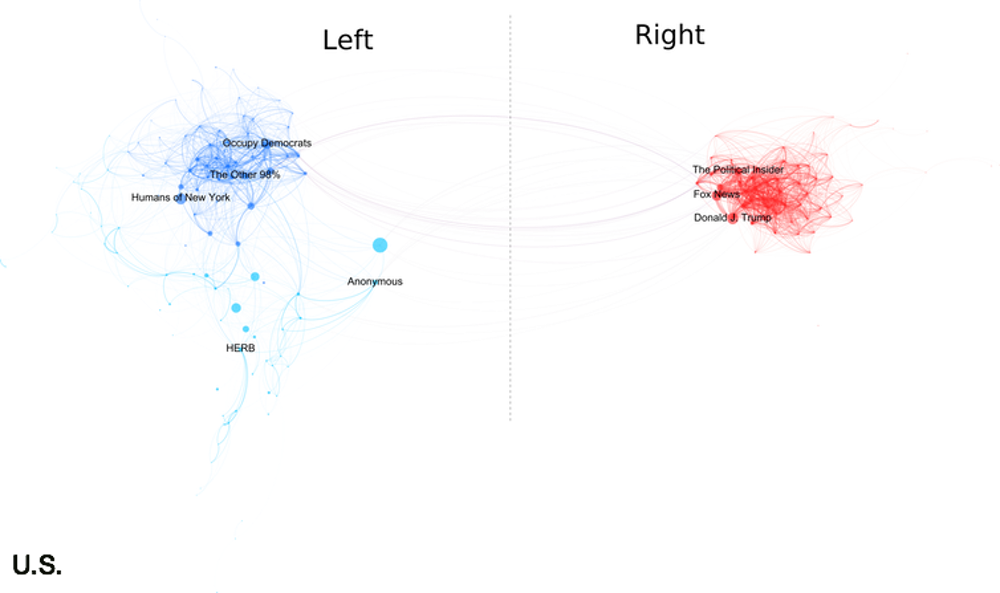
One year after the election of Donald Trump as U.S. president, American Facebook users on the political right and political left shared almost no common interests.

- Political polarization in the United States (1990s–present). Since the 1990s, the U.S. has experienced more "partisan sorting" (i.e. liberal Republicans and conservative Democrats began to disappear); as well as a greater surge in ideological polarization, and affective polarization than comparable democracies, with a shift away from focus on political success, toward the abhorrence and domination ("owning") of supporters of the opposing party. This move away from the center and change in ideology has not been symmetrical, with Republicans moving farther to the right than Democrats have moved to the left (based on rankings of congressional roll-call votes). (Note: see also Sahil Chinoy: the Republican Party "leans much farther right than most traditional conservative parties in Western Europe and Canada", based on its party manifestos, while the Democratic Party is still close to other left-of-center parties in developed democracies.) Republican strategist Newt Gingrich introduced a "Take No Prisoners" or "no-holds-barred" style in Congress, that abandoned the norm whereby Democrats were opponents in elections but primarily colleagues to negotiate with in making good legislation. Gingrich taught that they were the enemy to be defeated, attacked as "traitors ... liars ... cheaters". Karl Rove emphasized that elections are won by energizing the party "base" (core supporters), not reaching out to the persuadable or swing voter in the middle; attacking opponents strong points (for example running ads implying decorated veterans—Max Cleland and John Kerry—were actually treasonous). Conspiracy theories also began to become mainstream among Republicans during this time (for example accusing then Secretary of State Hillary Clinton of ordering the military to not protect Americans at the U.S. compound in Benghazi).
- Presidency of Donald Trump (2017–2021). After decades of dominance, "Reagan Revolution" rhetoric and policy, began to be replaced by new themes Reaganism had not emphasized, (cultural/attitudinal conservatism such as opposition to gay marriage, transgender rights). Themes it had not objected to (immigration from non-European countries) or had unequivocally supported (economic globalization and especially big business) were abandoned or attacked. Populism replaced gentility, and prudent Edmund Burke conservatism. In the party base, not only had conservative (white) blue collar workers migrated to the Republican Party, but a business class that had been part of the Republican Party since the post-Civil War Gilded Age, began to leave. (Note: Ross Douthat explained the shift: The Republican Party in the Trump era remained a mostly pro-business party in its policies but its constituencies and rhetoric have tilted more working class and populist ... much of corporate America has swung culturally into liberalism's camp. ... accelerated by anti-Trump backlash, the more left-leaning commitments of big business's younger customers and (especially) younger employees, ... As a consequence, today's G.O.P. is most clearly now the party of local capitalism—the small-business gentry, the family firms.... Much of the party elite wish to continue doing business with big business as before. But the party's base regards corporate institutions—especially in Silicon Valley, but extending to more traditional capitalist powers—as cultural enemies ... In the words of Republican Senator Marco Rubio: "Big Business is not our ally. They are eager culture warriors who use the language of wokeness to cover free-market capitalism." Journalist David Brooks argued that "the information age is transforming the American right. Conservatives have always inveighed against the cultural elite—the media, the universities, Hollywood. But in the Information Age, the purveyors of culture are now corporate titans".) Added to the louder and growing number of conspiracy theories (Note: When conspiracy theories started appearing after the intruder attack with a hammer of 82-year-old Paul Pelvis, Chris Cillizza of CNN described them as "unfortunately, ... par for the course for the former president and the movement that he leads. The embrace of conspiracy theories sits at the very heart of Trumpism. Remember that Trump once suggested, without evidence, that Texas Sen. Ted Cruz's father might have been involved in the assassination of John F. Kennedy. And that the Iowa caucuses had been stolen from him. And that the 2020 election was stolen from him. And that the FBI search at Mar-a-Lago might have really been an effort to reclaim Hillary Clinton's email server. Conspiracy theories have a special appeal to Trump because they speak to the underlying appeal he has to his followers: The elites in the country are always up to something nefarious and they are trying to keep that fact from you. They want to keep you in the dark, but you are too smart for that, so you see through the stories they are telling you.") were "alternative facts". The "bedrock principle of democracy, that losing candidates and their supporters accept the results" was no longer supported by the majority of Republicans. Not only did white southerners leave the Democratic party but eventually a large majority of rural and working class whites nationwide became the base of the Republican Party. Whereas for decades the college-educated voters skewed heavily toward the Republican party, eventually high educational attainment was a marker of Democratic support, (leading Donald Trump to proclaim to supporters, "I love the poorly educated!"). Post-2012 has also been characterized by even political division and a lack of a dominant political party.

=== Development of voting ===
In pre-colonial and post-revolutionary American times, voters went to the polls and publicly stated which candidate they supported, rather than voting secretly, which was considered "cowardly" and "underhanded". Originally, state laws required voters to be property owners, but "by the time Andrew Jackson was elected President, in 1828, nearly all white men could vote".

Later in the 19th century, voting was done by written paper ballot. A broadened franchise where many voters were illiterate or misspelling disqualified a vote, led to the use of printed ballots. Each political party would create its own ballot—preprinted "party tickets"—give them to supporters, and who would publicly put the party's ballot into the voting box, or hand them to election judges through a window. The tickets indicated a vote for all of that party's slate of candidates, preventing "ticket splitting". (As of 1859 "nowhere in the United States ... did election officials provide ballots", i.e. they all came from political parties.) In cities voters often had to make their way through a throng of partisans who would try to prevent supporters of the opposing party from voting, a practice generally allowed unless it "clearly" appeared "that there was such a display of force as ought to have intimidated men of ordinary firmness." The practice was dangerous enough that in "the middle decades of the nineteenth century," several dozen (89) were killed in Election Day riots.

It was not until the late nineteenth century that states began to adopt the Australian secret-ballot method (despite fears it "would make any nation a nation of scoundrels"), and it eventually became the national standard. The secret ballot method ensured that the privacy of voters would be protected (hence government jobs could no longer be awarded to loyal voters), and each state would be responsible for creating one official ballot.

==== Suffrage ====
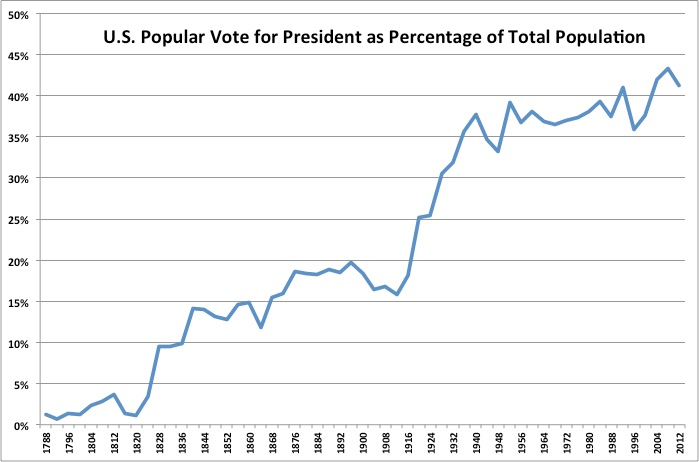
U.S. presidential election popular vote totals as a percentage of the total U.S. population grew from 1-2% in the first American elections to over 40% by the 21st century. Note the surge in 1828 (extension of suffrage to non-property-owning white men), the drop from 1890 to 1910 (when Southern states disenfranchised most African Americans and many poor whites), and another surge in 1920 (extension of suffrage to women).

Some key events of suffrage expansion are:

- 1792–1856: Abolition of property qualifications for white men were abolished.
- 1868: Citizenship was guaranteed to all persons born or naturalized in the United States by the Fourteenth Amendment, although Jim Crow laws prevented most African Americans from voting.
- 1920: Women are guaranteed the right to vote in all US states by the Nineteenth Amendment.
- 1964-66: Civil Rights laws and Supreme Court rulings eliminate tax payment and wealth requirements and protect voter registration and voting for racial minorities.
- 1971: Adults aged 18 through 20 are granted the right to vote by the Twenty-sixth Amendment.

== Concerns, problems and criticism ==
Ongoing concerns include lack of representation in the U.S. territories and the District of Columbia; fear that the interests of some are overrepresented, while others are underrepresented; a fear that certain features of the American political system make it less democratic, a fear that a small cultural elite has undermined traditional values, and whether policy and law-making is dominated by a small economic elite molding it to their interests. Greater representation given to small states in the Senate and the Electoral College, "first-past-the-post" voting, gerrymandering, etc.—have in recent years had a more extreme effect and have begun to create a disconnect between what the government does (in legislation and court rulings) and what the majority of Americans want.

In an August 31, 2022, poll by Quinnipiac University, 69 percent of Democrats and 69 percent of Republicans replied yes to the question "Do you think the nation's democracy is in danger of collapse". A 2020 study, "Global Satisfaction with Democracy" by the Bennett Institute for Public Policy at the University of Cambridge, found that

for the first time on record, polls show a majority of Americans dissatisfied with their system of government—a system of which they were once famously proud. Such levels of democratic dissatisfaction would not be unusual elsewhere. But for the United States, it marks an "end of exceptionalism"—a profound shift in America's view of itself, and therefore, of its place in the world.

Concerns about the American political system include how well it represents and serves the interests of Americans. They include:

- underrepresentation of certain groups (women, Black people, Latin Americans, Native Americans, LGBT people, and those under 60 years old);
- complete failure to represent other groups (citizens living in territories, in D.C. (for Congress), and felons in some states);
- whether policy and law-making is dominated by a small economic elite molding it to their interests;
- whether a small cultural elite has undermined traditional values;
- lack of a universal or single payer healthcare system, instead of the current system of reliance on employer provided for-profit private healthcare

More recently, concerns have included:

- a significant disconnect between what the majority of Americans want and what its government does (in supreme court rulings, legislation, etc.). This has expanded since the 1990s due to systemic issues such as gerrymandering, the United States Electoral College, first-past-the-post voting, etc.
- "a growing movement inside one of the country's two major parties—the Republican Party—to refuse to accept defeat in an election";
- a belief (without evidence) that voter fraud is "being committed by minority voters on a massive scale" preventing Republicans from being elected.

=== Underrepresentation by gender, ethnicity and sexual orientation ===
Observations of historical trends and current governmental demographics have raised concerns about the equity of political representation in the United States. In particular, scholars have noted that levels of descriptive representation—which refers to when political representatives share demographic backgrounds or characteristics with their constituents—do not match the racial and gender makeup of the US. Descriptive representation is noted to be beneficial because of its symbolic representative benefits as a source of emotional identification with one's representatives. Furthermore, descriptive representation can lead to more substantive and functional representation, as well as greater institutional power, which can result in minority constituents having both representatives with matching policy views and power in the political system. Serving as a congressional committee chair is considered to be a good example of this relationship, as chairs control which issues are addressed by committees, especially through hearings that bring substantial attention to certain issues. Though minorities like African Americans and Latinos have rarely served as committee chairs, studies have shown that their presence has directly led to significantly higher likelihoods of minority issues being addressed. Given that racial and ethnic minorities of all backgrounds have historically been marginalized from participating in the US political system, their political representation and access to policymaking has been limited. Similarly, women lack proportional representation in the United States, bringing into question the extent to which women's issues are adequately addressed. Other minority groups, such as the LGBTQ community, have also been disadvantaged by an absence of equitable representation—especially since scholars have noted their gradual shift from originally being perceived as more of a moral political issue to being considered an actual constituency.

Political representation is also an essential part of making sure that citizens have faith that representatives, political institutions, and democracy take their interests into account. For women and minorities, this issue can occur even in the levels of government that are meant to be closest to constituents, such as among members of Congress in the House of Representatives. Scholars have noted that in positions such as these, even close proximity to constituents does not necessarily translate to an understanding of their needs or experiences and that constituents can still feel unrepresented. In a democracy, a lack of faith in one's representatives can cause them to search for less-democratic alternative forms of representation, like unelected individuals or interest groups. For racial and ethnic minorities, the risk of seeking alternative representation is especially acute, as lived experiences often lead to different political perspectives that can be difficult for white representatives to fully understand or adequately address. Moreover, studies have begun to increasingly show that people of all races and genders tend to prefer having members of Congress who share their race or gender, which can also lead to more engagement between constituents and their representatives, as well as higher likelihoods of contacting or having faith in their congressperson. In addition to making it more likely that constituents will trust their representatives, having descriptive representation can help sustain an individual's positive perceptions of government. When considering women in particular, it has been suggested that broader economic and social equality could result from first working toward ensuring more equitable political representation for women, which would also help promote increased faith between women and their representatives.

==== Race and ethnicity ====
There are 57 African American members of the US House (blue), 47 Hispanics and Latinos (red), 5 Native Americans (yellow), 18 Asian Americans (green), and 314 Whites (gray). 117th Congress (2021–2023)

There are 3 African American members of the US Senate (blue), 7 Hispanics or Latinos (red), 0 Native Americans, 2 Asian Americans (green), and 88 European Americans(gray). 117th Congress (2021–2023)

===== African Americans =====
Although African Americans have begun to continually win more elected positions and increase their overall political representation, they still lack proportional representation across a variety of different levels of government. Some estimates indicate that most gains for African Americans—and other minorities in general—have not occurred at higher levels of government, but rather at sub-levels in federal and state governments. Additionally, congressional data from 2017 revealed that 35.7% of African Americans nationwide had a congressperson of the same race, while the majority of black Americans were represented by members of Congress of a different race. Scholars have partially explained this discrepancy by focusing on the obstacles that black candidates face. Factors like election type, campaign costs, district demographics, and historical barriers, such as voter suppression, can all hinder the likelihood of a black candidate winning an election or even choosing to enter into an election process. Demographics, in particular, are noted to have a large influence on black candidate success, as research has shown that the ratio of white-to-black voters can have a significant impact on a black candidate's chance of winning an election and that large black populations tend to increase the resources available to African American candidates. Despite the variety of obstacles that have contributed to the lack of proportional representation for African Americans, other factors have been found to increase the likelihood of a black candidate winning an election. Based on data from a study in Louisiana, prior black incumbency, as well as running for an office that other black candidates had pursued in the past, increased the likelihood of African Americans entering into races and winning elections.

===== Hispanic and Latino Americans =====
As the most populous minority demographic identified in the 2010 US Census, Hispanic and Latino Americans have become an increasingly important constituency that is spread throughout the United States. Despite also constituting 15% of the population in at least a quarter of House districts, Latino representation in Congress has not correspondingly increased. Furthermore, in 2017, Latino members of Congress only represented about one-quarter of the total Latino population in the US. While there are many potential explanations for this disparity, including issues related to voter suppression, surveys of Latino voters have identified trends unique to their demographic—though survey data has still indicated that descriptive representation is important to Hispanic and Latino voters. While descriptive representation may be considered important, an analysis of a 2004 national survey of Latinos revealed that political participation and substantive representation were strongly associated with each other, possibly indicating that voters mobilize more on behalf of candidates whose policy views reflect their own, rather than for those who share their ethnic background. Moreover, a breakdown of the rationale for emphasizing descriptive representation reveals additional factors behind supporting Latino candidates, such as the view that they may have a greater respect and appreciation for Spanish or a belief that Latinos are "linked" together, indicating the significance of shared cultural experiences and values. Although the reasons behind choosing to vote for Latino candidates are not monolithic, the election of Latinos to Congress has been identified as resulting in benefits for minorities overall. While it has been argued that unique district-related issues can take equal or greater precedence than Latino interests for Hispanic and Latino members of Congress, studies have also shown that Latinos are more likely to support African American members of Congress—and vice versa—beyond just what is expected from shared party membership.

===== Native Americans =====
Similar to other minority groups, Native Americans often lack representation due to electoral policies. Gerrymandering, in particular, is noted as a method of concentrating Native voters in a limited number of districts to reduce their ability to influence multiple elections. Despite structural efforts to limit their political representation, some states with large Native American populations have higher levels of representation. South Dakota has a Native population of about 9% with multiple federally recognized tribal nations, and it has been used as a case study of representation. A 2017 study that conducted interviews of former state elected officials in South Dakota revealed that even though many felt that they were only able to implement a limited number of significant changes for tribal communities, they still considered it to be "absolutely essential" that Native Americans had at least some descriptive representation to prevent complete exclusion from the political process. Moreover, formerly elected state and local government officials asserted that ensuring that the issues and concerns of tribal nations were addressed and understood depended on politicians with Native backgrounds. Historically backed suspicion and skepticism of the predominantly white US government was also considered to be an important reason for having representatives that reflect the histories and views of Native Americans.

===== Asian Americans and Pacific Islanders =====
Relative to other, larger minority demographics in the United States, Asian Americans and Pacific Islanders (AAPI) face different challenges related to political representation. Few congressional districts have a population that includes over 50% Asian Americans, which can elevate the likelihood of being represented by someone of a different race or ethnicity. As with other minorities, this can result in people feeling unrepresented by their member of Congress.

==== Gender and political representation ====
There are 122 women members of the US House (blue) and 319 men (gray). 117th Congress (2021–2023)

There are 24 women members of the US Senate (blue) and 76 men (gray). 117th Congress (2021–2023)

Women have made continual socioeconomic progress in many key areas of society, such as in employment and education, and in comparison to men, women have voted at higher rates for over forty years—making their lack of more proportional representation in the political system surprising. Some scholars have partially attributed this discrepancy to the electoral system in the United States, as it does not provide a mechanism for the types of gender quotas seen in other countries. Additionally, even though gerrymandering and concentrated political representation can essentially ensure at least some representation for minority racial and ethnic groups, women—who are relatively evenly spread throughout the United States—do not receive similar benefits from this practice. Identifying the source of unequal gender representation of individuals can be predicted along party and ideological lines. A survey of attitudes toward women candidates revealed that Democrats are more likely to attribute systemic issues to gender inequalities in political representation, while Republicans are less likely to hold this perspective. While identifying an exact source of inequality may ultimately prove unlikely, some recent studies have suggested that the political ambitions of women may be influenced by the wide variety of proposed factors attributed to the underrepresentation of women. In contrast to attributing specific reasons to unequal representation, political party has also been identified as a way of predicting if a woman running for office is more likely to receive support, as women candidates are more likely to receive votes from members of their party and Independents.

===== Social inequality and sexism =====
Social inequality and sexism have been noted by scholars as influencing the electoral process for women. In a survey of attitudes toward women candidates, women respondents were far more likely to view the process of running for office as "hostile" to women than men, especially when considering public hesitancy to support women candidates, media coverage, and public discrimination. Political fundraising for candidates is also an area of inequality, as men donate at a higher rate than women—which is compounded by gender and racial inequalities related to income and employment. Recent increases in woman-focused fundraising groups have started to alter this imbalance. Given that disproportionate levels of household labor often become the responsibility of women, discrimination within households has also been identified as a major influence on the capability of women to run for office. For women in the LGBTQ community, some scholars have raised concern about the unequal attention paid to the needs of lesbians compared to transgender, bisexual, and queer women, with lesbian civil rights described as receiving more of a focus from politicians.

===== Social pressures and influences =====
Social pressures are another influence on women who run for office, often coinciding with sexism and discrimination. Some scholars have argued that views of discrimination have prompted a decrease in the supply of women willing to run for office, though this has been partially countered by those who argue that women are actually just more "strategic" when trying to identify an election with favorable conditions. Other factors, like the overrepresentation of men, have been described as influencing perceptions of men as somehow inherently more effective as politicians or leaders, which some scholars argue could pressure women to stay out of elections. Others contend that the overrepresentation of men can actually result in "political momentum" for women, such as during the Year of the Woman. Within some racial and ethnic groups, social influences can also shape political engagement. Among Latinos, Latinas are more likely to partake in non-electoral activities, like community organizing, when compared to men. Despite differences in political activity and social pressures, elected women from both political parties have voiced their support for electing more women to Congress to increase the acceptance of their voices and experiences. Furthermore, studies have found that increasing the descriptive representation of women can provide positive social influences for democracy as a whole, such as improved perceptions of an individual's political efficacy and government's responsiveness to the needs of people. When women can vote for a woman candidate of the same party, studies have also found that these influences can be magnified.

==== LGBT political representation ====
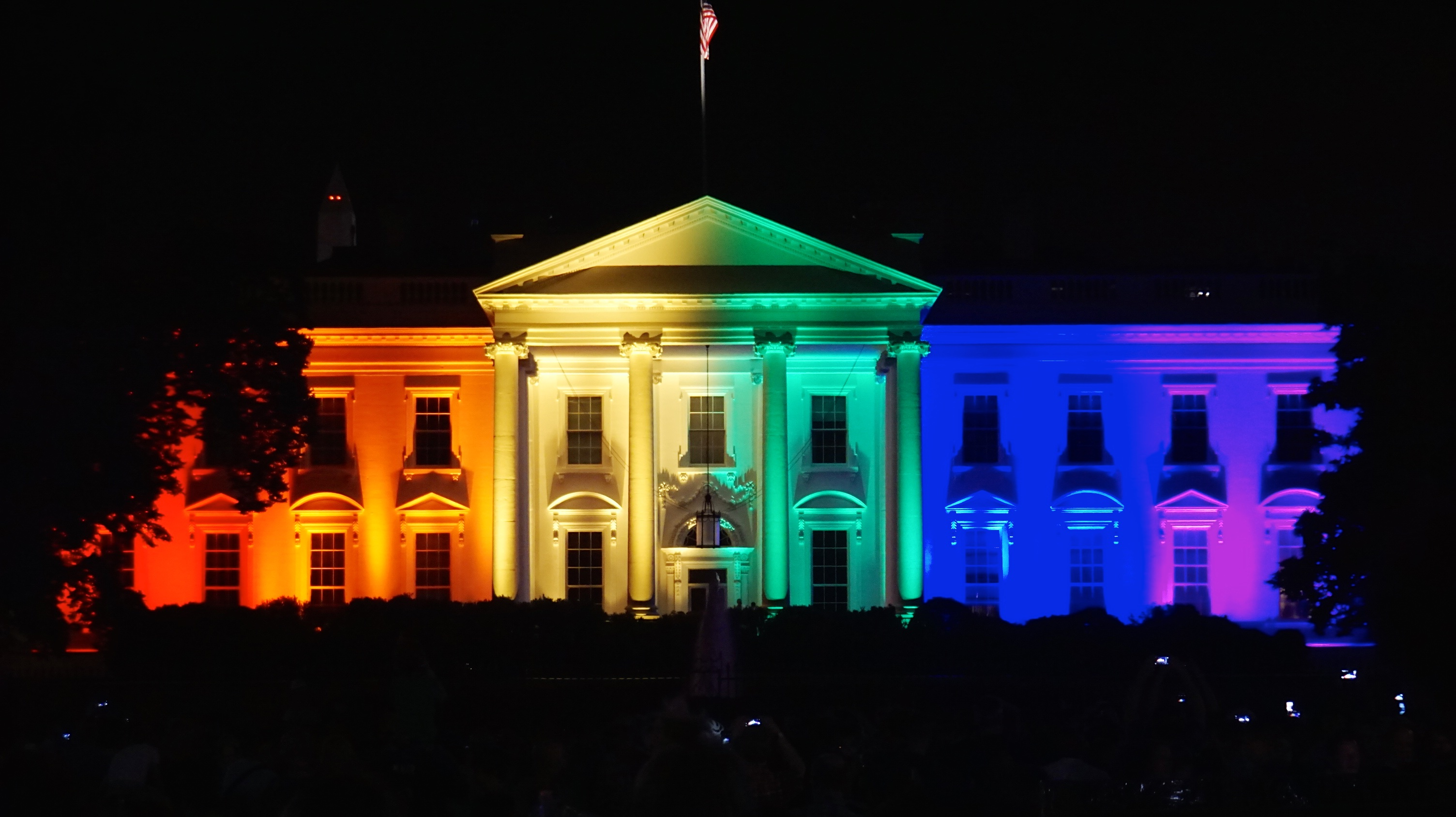
The White House illuminated in the colors of the rainbow flag after the Obergefell v. Hodges ruling legalized same-sex marriage nationally

Although some scholars have disputed the benefits of descriptive representation, only a small number have argued that this form of representation actually has negative impacts on the group it represents. Studies of bills relating to LGBT rights in state legislatures have provided a more nuanced analysis. Pro-LGBT bills tend to be introduced in higher numbers when more LGBT representatives are elected to state legislatures, which may also indicate an increased likelihood of substantive representation. Increases in openly LGBT state lawmakers have also been hypothesized to inadvertently result in more anti-LGBT legislation, potentially as the result of backlash to their presence. Despite the risk of negative consequences, at least one study has concluded that the LGBT community receives net-benefits from increased openly LGBT representation. On the federal level, the presence of the Congressional LGBTQ+ Equality Caucus has been identified as improving the ability of Congress to address the intersectional issues faced by the LGBT community, as well as provide a source of pressure other than constituency on members of Congress to address LGBT issues. Additionally, non-LGBT members of the caucus have been criticized for not sponsoring enough legislation, emphasizing the value of openly LGBT members of Congress. While descriptive representation has provided benefits overall, scholars have noted that some groups in the community, such as transgender and bisexual people, tend to receive less focus than gays and lesbians.

=== Democratic backsliding ===
At least two "well-regarded" global democracy indices — V-Dem Democracy indices, and Democracy Index (The Economist) — "show an erosion of American democracy since 2016".

=== Disconnect between public opinion and government policy ===
A July 2026 Pew Research Center opinion found the main political issues in the United States were economy, cost of living, public sector ethics, immigration and health care. A disconnect between "the power to set government policy" and political opinions of the general public has been noted by commentators and scholars (such as David Leonhardt). The United States is "far and away the most countermajoritarian democracy in the world," according to Steven Levitsky.

Before the 2000 election, only three candidates for president won "while losing the popular vote (John Quincy Adams, Rutherford Hayes and Benjamin Harrison), and each served only a single term", while as of 2022 "two of the past four presidents have taken office despite losing the popular vote" - George W. Bush in 2000 and Donald Trump in 2016.

Leonhardt points out that in one branch of the federal government—the Supreme Court—conservative legal decisions "both sweeping and, according to polls, unpopular" were delivered in 2022, what is likely the beginning of a reshaping of "American politics for years, if not decades" to come by the court's "Republican appointees". This is despite the fact that the president appoints the nominees, and that presidential candidates of the Democratic Party have won the popular vote in seven out of eight last elections (from 1992 to 2020).

In the 2020 U.S. Senate, "50 Democratic senators effectively represent 186 million Americans, while the 50 Republican senators effectively represent 145 million".

Explanations include:

- geographical sorting by ideology. "Parts of the country granted outsize power by the Constitution" (i.e. less populated states), formerly voted more or less similarly to the large states and urban areas that were granted less power. Thus "the small-state bonus" giving disproportionate power in "the Senate and Electoral College had only a limited effect on national results". This is no longer the case. Rural areas are more uniformly conservative and urban areas liberal. More important is "the winner-take-all nature of the Electoral College" (all states except Maine and Nebraska), which gives greater bias to Republicans.
- faster population growth of large (population) states than small states. The state with the largest population in 1790 was Virginia with approximately 13 times as many residents as the smallest (Delaware). Today, "California, which consistently votes for liberal candidates statewide, "has 68 times as many residents as Wyoming; 53 times as many as Alaska; and at least 20 times as many as another 11 states". When a candidate wins a statewide election in California (or New York) by a landslide, these large numbers of popular votes mean nothing in the tally of Electoral College votes or Senate seats.
- while the House of Representatives would seem to have "a more equitable system for allocating political power"—dividing the country "into 435 districts, each with a broadly similar number of people" (760,000 as of 2022)—Leonhardt argues two features distort this equity:
  - gerrymandering, i.e. the drawing of district boundaries by State legislatures for partisan advantage, something Republicans have been "more forceful" about in recent years.
  - the phenomenon of "wasted votes", whereby the increasing concentration of Democratic voters in large metro areas means Democrats often win elections in these districts by "landslides", leading to the overall nationwide proportion of votes for Democrats significantly less than the proportion of seats for Democrats in the House.

==== Oligarchy ====
Chart comparing effective total (federal and state and local) tax burden in the United States, of the richest Americans and those in the bottom 50% of earners

In 2014, United Press International reported that the political structure of the United States has become an oligarchy, where a small economic elite overwhelmingly dominate policy and law. Some academic researchers and Oxfam suggest a drift toward oligarchy has been occurring by way of the influence of corporations, wealthy, and other special interest groups, leaving individual citizens with less impact than economic elites and organized interest groups in the political process.

An April 2014 study by political scientists Martin Gilens (Princeton University) and Benjamin Page (Northwestern University) concluded that the U.S. government does not represent the interests of the majority of its citizens but instead is "ruled by those of the rich and powerful". The researchers after analyzing nearly 1,800 U.S. policies between 1981 and 2002, stated that government policies tend to favour special interests and lobbying organizations, and that whenever a majority of citizens disagrees with the economic elites, the elites tend to prevail in getting their way. While not characterizing the United States as an "oligarchy" or "plutocracy" outright, Gilens and Page give weight to the idea of a "civil oligarchy" as used by Jeffrey A. Winters, saying, "Winters has posited a comparative theory of 'Oligarchy,' in which the wealthiest citizens—even in a 'civil oligarchy' like the United States—dominate policy concerning crucial issues of wealth- and income-protection." In their study, Gilens and Page reached these conclusions:

When a majority of citizens disagrees with economic elites and/or with organized interests, they generally lose. Moreover, because of the strong status quo bias built into the US political system, even when fairly large majorities of Americans favor policy change, they generally do not get it. ... [T]he preferences of the average American appear to have only a minuscule, near-zero, statistically non-significant impact upon public policy.

E. J. Dionne Jr. described what he considers the effects of ideological and oligarchical interests on the judiciary. The journalist, columnist, and scholar interprets recent Supreme Court decisions as ones that allow wealthy elites to use economic power to influence political outcomes in their favor. In speaking about the Supreme Court's McCutcheon v. FEC and Citizens United v. FEC decisions, Dionne wrote: "Thus has this court conferred on wealthy people the right to give vast sums of money to politicians while undercutting the rights of millions of citizens to cast a ballot."

Nobel Prize–winning economist Paul Krugman wrote:

The stark reality is that we have a society in which money is increasingly concentrated in the hands of a few people. This threatens to make us a democracy in name only.

A November 2022 study by Pew Research Center showed that majorities in both the Republican and Democratic parties held increasingly negative views of major financial institutions and large corporations.

==== Gerrymandering ====
Gerrymandering is the practice of shaping the boundaries of electoral districts for partisan advantage—those boundaries being reviewed and usually changed after every United States census, i.e. every ten years. Gerrymandering involves what's commonly called "cracking and packing".

- "Cracking" is the process of moving the boundaries of districts to spread opposition voters thinly enough across many districts so that they constitute a safe margin below 50%. Cracking spreads opposition voters thinly across many districts to dilute their power.
- "Packing" is the process of concentrating opposition voters in one or more (but always a minority of) districts, to "waste" opposition votes.

Used almost since the founding of the United States (the term was coined in 1810 after a review of Massachusetts's redistricting maps of 1812 set by Governor Elbridge Gerry noted that one of the districts looked like a salamander), in the 21st century it has "become a much more effective tool". Since 2010, detailed maps and high-speed computing have facilitated gerrymandering by political parties in the redistricting process, in order to gain control of state legislation and congressional representation and potentially to maintain that control over several decades, even against shifting political changes in a state's population. It allows the drawing of districts "with surgical precision". According to Julia Kirschenbaum and Michael Li of the Brennan Center

In 2010, Republicans—in an effort to control the drawing of congressional maps—forged a campaign to win majorities in as many state legislatures as possible. It was wildly successful, giving them control over the drawing of 213 congressional districts. The redrawing of maps that followed produced some of the most extreme gerrymanders in history. In battleground Pennsylvania, for example, the congressional map gave Republicans a virtual lock on 13 of the state's 18 congressional districts, even in elections where Democrats won the majority of the statewide congressional vote.

Attempts to appeal to the Supreme Court to disallow gerrymandering in cases such as Vieth v. Jubelirer in 2004 and its passing up of "numerous opportunities" in 2017 and 2018 "to decide upon the constitutional legality or illegality of gerrymandering" has "emboldened ever more partisan gerrymandering".

In addition to giving one party power beyond its popular support, gerrymandering has been criticized for weakening the political power of minority voters by concentrating them into district(s) (though this process can also help ensure the election of a representative of the same race).

=== Polarization increase ===
Since the 1970s, the United States has grown more polarized, with rapid increases in polarization during the 2000s onward. As a general rule, urban areas and suburbs have become more "blue", Democratic or liberal, while agricultural rural areas have become more "red", Republican or conservative. Since many states have no large or extensive urban areas the result is that there are many "red" states in the south and Midwest, while coastal states which contain extensive urbanized areas tend to be "blue." Rural areas with a recreational focus such as ski resorts are an exception to the general rule. The polarization has been both more ideological (differences between the policy positions) and affective (i.e. a dislike and distrust of opposing political groups), than comparable democracies.

Polarization among U.S. legislators is asymmetric, as it has primarily been driven by a substantial rightward shift among congressional Republicans, alongside a much smaller leftward shift among congressional Democrats. New Democrats advocated for neoliberal policies including financial deregulation and free trade, which is seen to have shifted the Democratic Party rightward on economic issues. Since the early 2010s, the party has shifted significantly to the left on social, cultural, and religious issues. According to the Pew Research Center, members of both parties who have unfavorable opinions of the opposing party have doubled since 1994, while those who have very unfavorable opinions of the opposing party are at record highs as of 2022.

=== Concerns about the refusal to accept defeat ===
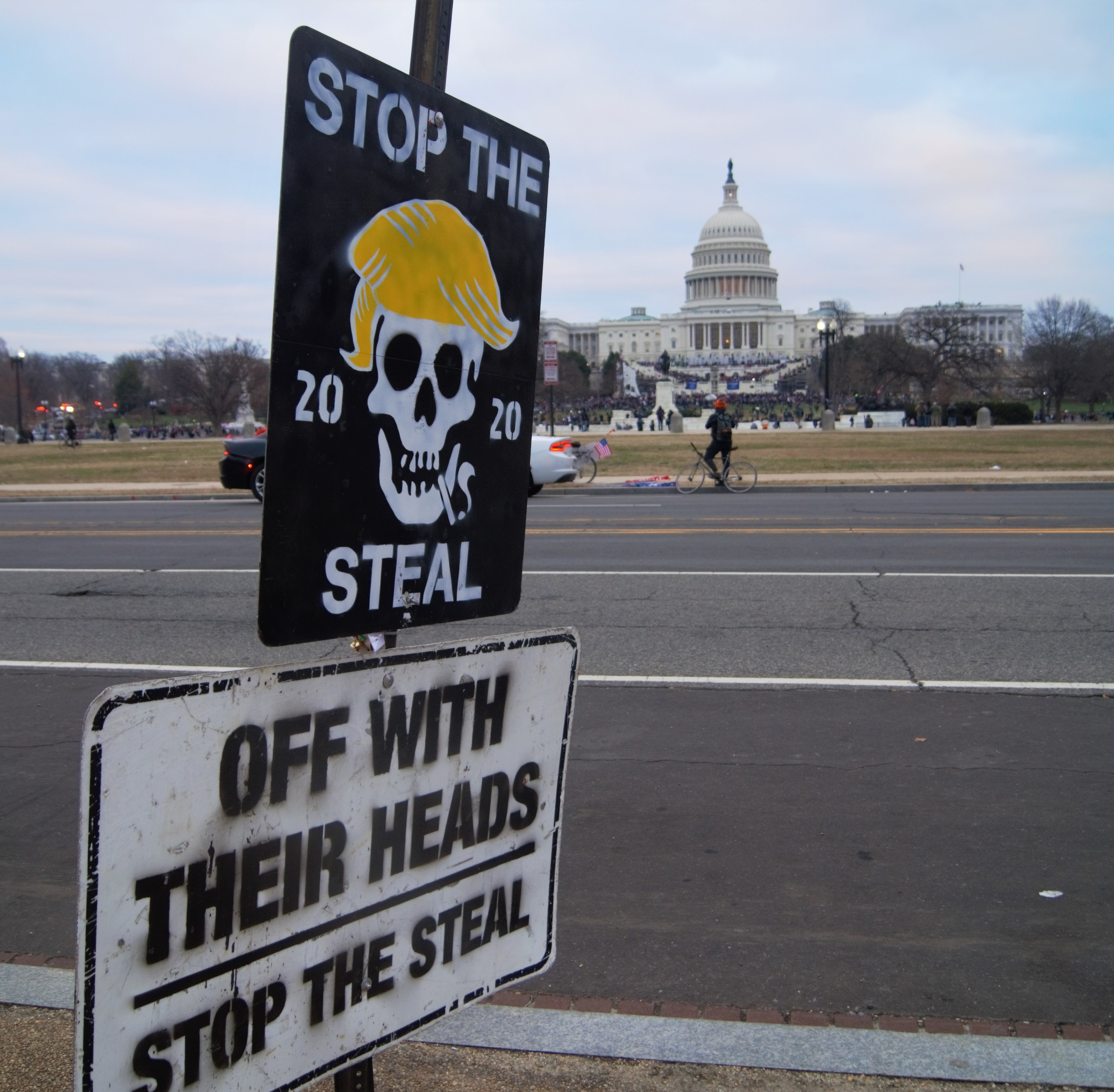
Signs reading "Stop the Steal" and "Off with their heads", photographed on the day of the January 6 attack

Many commentators and scholars (such as David Leonhardt) have expressed alarm at the "growing movement inside one of the country's two major parties—the Republican Party—to refuse to accept defeat in an election". In a survey by journalists (of the Washington Post) less than two months before the 2022 congressional election, a "majority of Republicans" in "important battleground" election campaigns, refused "to say they will accept the November election outcome". Six key Senate and gubernatorial Republican party nominees refused to commit to accepting the results of the November election: Blake Masters in Arizona, JD Vance in Ohio, Rep. Ted Budd in North Carolina, Kelly Tshibaka in Alaska, Tudor Dixon in Michigan and Geoff Diehl in Massachusetts.

While the claim by a losing candidate that they won "despite clear evidence he lost", may have started with Donald Trump after his loss in 2020, during primaries leading up to the November 2022 general election, "candidates across the country have refused to concede—even in races that are not remotely close".

This trend has been manifested in the violent January 6, 2021 attack on the US Capitol to prevent the certification of Joe Biden as president and the hundreds of elected Republican officials throughout the United States that said that the 2020 presidential election was "rigged", some of whom "are running for statewide offices that would oversee future elections, potentially putting them in position to overturn an election in 2024 or beyond". According to Yascha Mounk, "There is the possibility, for the first time in American history, that a legitimately elected president will not be able to take office".

In part the phenomenon is international, democracies are struggling in other parts of the world led by the forces of "digital media, cultural change, and economic stagnation in affluent countries". Leonhardt states that "many experts point out that it is still not clear how the country will escape a larger crisis, such as an overturned election, at some point in the coming decade."

=== Deterioration of other norms ===
==== Abandonment of campaign debates ====
In the 2022 elections observers have noted lack of participation in debates between candidates, and in the "retail politicking" that has been a political "cliché ... for generations" in American politics: pressing the flesh at "diners and state fairs ... town-hall-style meetings ... where citizens get to question their elected leaders and those running to replace them". Replacing these are "safer spaces" for candidates, "partisan news outlets, fund-raisers with supporters, friendly local crowds", as the number of competitive House of Representative districts and "swing voters" grows smaller, and candidates concentrate on mobilizing the party loyalists rather than appealing to undecided voters (appeals touching on compromise and bipartisanship angering party hardliners).

Observers see a danger in candidates avoiding those tougher interactions, which cut down on the opportunities for candidates' characters and limitations to be revealed, and for elected officials to be held accountable to those who elected them. For the politicians, it creates an artificial environment where their positions appear uniformly popular and opposing views are angrily denounced, making compromise seem risky.

==== Other norms ====
Under the campaign and presidency of Donald Trump, observers (such as political scientist Brendan Nyhan) noted some erosion of political norms and ethics, including:

- acceptable background for high level officials. (Jeff Sessions was rejected by the U.S. Senate in 1986 for a federal judgeship because his history on racial issues was considered to be disqualifying, but served as U.S. attorney general from February 9, 2017, to November 7, 2018.)
- intolerance of criticism is evident in statements such as "Trump Threatens White House Protesters With 'Vicious Dogs' and 'Ominous Weapons'"
- tolerance for conflicts of interest in government. Public officials who are also businessmen (Donald Trump) accepting money for their business (Trump hotel in Washington) from foreign governments with interests before the United States. ("The Trump hotel in Washington is pitching foreign diplomats on its services, which might violate a clause of the U.S. Constitution that is supposed to ensure that foreign governments can't buy favor with federal officials.")
- partisan abuse of power. After a Democratic candidate for governor won, Republican majorities in the legislatures of North Carolina, and Wisconsin voted in 2018 to "strip the legitimate powers of newly elected Democratic governors" while the "defeated or outgoing Republican incumbents are still around to sign the bills".
- Applying the rule of "Because we can". Announced on February 13, 2016, the Republican controlled senate refused to hold hearings on the appointment of Merrick Garland (a Democratic nominee) for the Supreme Court, maintaining it was too close to the November 8, 2016 election (almost nine months away at the time), and would deny the American people a "voice" in the selection of the next justice. Four years later, with a Republican now president, a ceremony was held for the nomination of a conservative justice for Supreme Court (Amy Coney Barrett) on September 26, 2020, a little more than one month (38 days) before Election Day, with Mitch McConnell claiming, "I think it's very important that we have nine Justices."

=== Antiquated institutions ===
Democratic backsliding concerns have led to some academics to warn that Supreme Court rulings, among other factors, have exacerbated the flaws in American institutions, creating a one-party state that no longer meets the minimum requirements to be considered a democracy.

=== Suggested reforms ===
==== Electing Supreme Court justices ====
With an implementation of term limits and holding elections for Supreme Court justices, the United States could solve the contentious battle for when Supreme Court members unexpectedly die. Packing the Supreme Court proposals would fade away if an election was going to decide the outcome. Thirty-three states already elect their state supreme courts. William Watkins Jr., a constitutional scholar from the Independent Institute on National Public Radio, stated his proposal for 8 to 10-year one-time term limits, he also said justices are supposed to be like umpires calling balls and strikes in the game but are acting more like coaches tinkering with starting lineups, and calling hit and runs. Local district attorneys and county sheriffs are elected and so could Supreme Court justices. The United States Senate used to be appointed by state legislatures before the 17th Amendment was passed in 1913 for them to be elected. A second constitutional convention of the states to amend the Constitution could be a way for this reform to proceed.

==== Term limits in the U.S. Congress ====
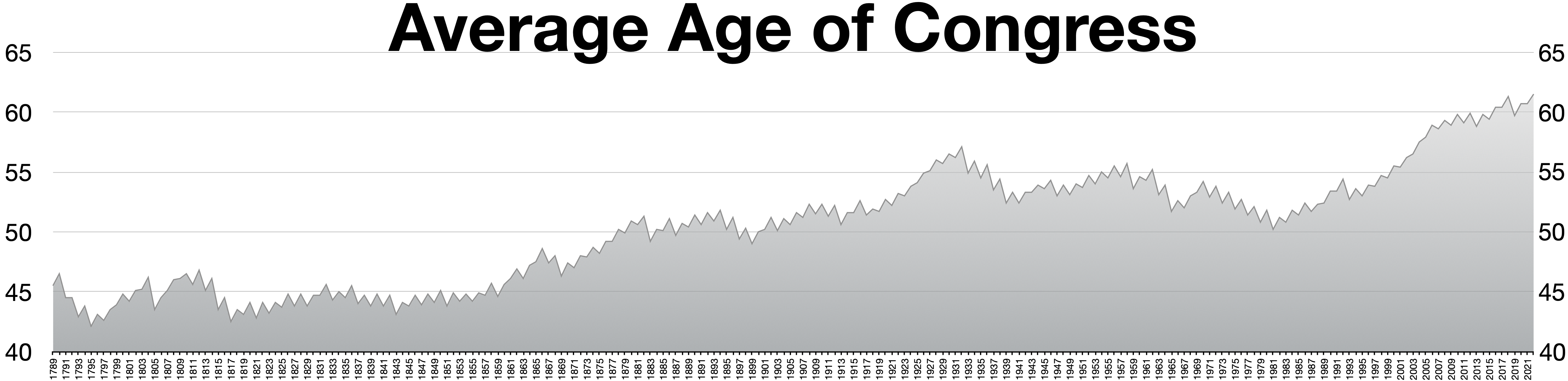
Average Age of Congress

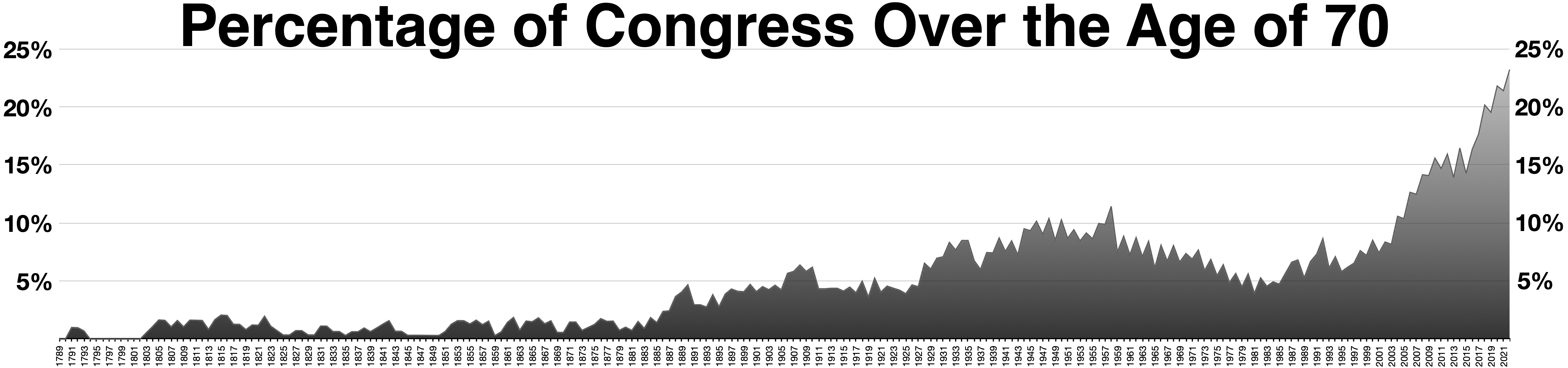
Percentage of Congress over the age of 70

A political movement around term limits for members of Congress gained considerable traction during the early 1990s. Twenty-three state governments passed legislation that term-limited congressional representatives from their respective state. The Supreme Court decision U.S. Term Limits, Inc. v. Thornton (1995) invalidated the term limit legislation found in those 23 states. Newt Gingrich's Contract with America promised legislation in the first 100 days for a constitutional amendment for term limits. However, the Term Limits Constitutional Amendment bill did not pass the 2/3 majority to move the bill forward and only passed with a simple majority of 227–204. It would have limited the House and Senate to 12 years total, six terms in the House, and two terms in the Senate. Today, U.S. Term Limits campaigns for 34 states to call for a Convention to propose amendments to the United States Constitution to create a Term Limits amendment.

== See also ==
- Culture of the United States
  - Culture of the Southern United States
- Foreign relations of the United States
- Gödel's loophole
- Gun politics in the United States
- History of the United States
  - History of the Southern United States
- Human rights in the United States
  - History of civil rights in the United States
    - Civil rights movement
- Politics of India
- Politics of the United Kingdom
- Initiatives and referendums in the United States
- Anti-fascism
  - Post–World War II anti-fascism
- Anti-racism
- Political ideologies in the United States
  - Conservatism in the United States
  - Liberalism in the United States
- Politics of the Southern United States
- Race and ethnicity in the United States
  - History of ethnocultural politics in the United States
    - Racism in the United States
      - Nativism in United States politics
      - Slavery in the United States
      - Xenophobia in the United States
- Radicalism in the United States
  - Democratic backsliding in the United States
  - Far-right politics#United States
    - Radical right (United States)
