= Solomon Messing =

Research scientist

Solomon Messing is a researcher and data scientist known for his work on how algorithms and social information embedded in new technologies affect the way people understand the political world. He was the founding Director of Pew Research Center's Data Labs, research scientist at Facebook and Twitter, chief scientist at Acronym, and is now Research Associate Professor at New York University.

Messing's work quantifying media polarization and filter bubbles was published in Science and has been influential in the field of political communication and sparked media commentary on the role of networks and algorithms in the media ecosystem. His work on how people understand election forecasting was the subject of public debate about the role of election forecasting in the democratic process and was cited by FiveThirtyEight's Politics Podcast as a reason for changing the forecast from percent change of winning to odds.

He also led the technical effort at Facebook to release perhaps the largest ever social media data set for research, which relied on a controversial technology, differential privacy, to protect data from malicious actors.

Messing earned his PhD in 2013 as well as a master's degree in Statistics from Stanford University.

== Most cited peer-reviewed journal articles ==
- Bakshy E, Messing S, Adamic LA. Exposure to ideologically diverse news and opinion on Facebook. Science. 2015 Jun 5;348(6239):1130-2. cited 2441 times in Google Scholar
- Messing S, Westwood SJ. Selective exposure in the age of social media: Endorsements trump partisan source affiliation when selecting news online. Communication Research. 2014 Dec;41(8):1042-63. cited 925 times in Google Scholar
- Grimmer J, Messing S, Westwood SJ. How words and money cultivate a personal vote: The effect of legislator credit claiming on constituent credit allocation' American Political Science Review. 2012 Nov;106(4):703-19.cited 311 times in Google Scholar
- Bond R, Messing S. Quantifying social media’s political space: Estimating ideology from publicly revealed preferences on Facebook. American Political Science Review. 2015 Feb;109(1):62-78. cited 182 times in Google Scholar
