= Political polarization =

Divergence of political attitudes

Political polarization score

Political polarization (spelt polarisation in British English, Australian English, and New Zealand English) is the divergence of political attitudes away from the center, towards ideological extremes. Scholars distinguish between ideological polarization (differences in the policy positions) and affective polarization (an emotional dislike and distrust of political out-groups).

Most discussions of polarization in political science consider polarization in the context of political parties and democratic systems of government. In two-party systems, political polarization usually embodies the tension of its binary political ideologies and partisan identities. However, some political scientists assert that contemporary polarization is less dependent on policy differences between left-wing and right-wing ideologies and is increasingly influenced by other divisions, such as religious against secular, nationalist against globalist, traditional against modern, or rural against urban. Polarization is associated with the process of politicization.

During the ongoing third wave of autocratization that has been ongoing since 2010, V-Dem has recorded that political polarization is increasing across nearly every region of the world, including in the United States, Europe, sub-Saharan Africa, Latin America, and South and Southeast Asia.

== Definitions and measurements ==
Polarization in itself is typically understood as "a prominent division or conflict that forms between major groups in a society or political system and that is marked by the clustering and radicalization of views and beliefs at two distant and antagonistic poles." as defined by the Institute for Integrated Transitions and Ford Foundation. Political scientists typically distinguish between two levels of political polarization: elite and mass. "Elite polarization" focuses on the polarization of the political elites, like party organizers and elected officials. "Mass polarization" (or popular polarization) focuses on the polarization of the masses, most often the electorate or general public.

=== Elite polarization ===
Elite polarization refers to polarization between the party-in-government and the party-in-opposition. Polarized political parties are internally cohesive, unified, programmatic, and ideologically distinct; they are typically found in a parliamentary system of democratic governance.

In a two-party system, a polarized legislature has two important characteristics: first, there is little-to-no ideological overlap between members of the two parties; and second, almost all conflict over legislation and policies is split across a broad ideological divide. This leads to a conflation of political parties and ideologies (i.e., Democrat and Republican become nearly perfect synonyms for liberal and conservative) and the collapse of an ideological center; however, using a cross-national design that covers 25 European countries, a 2022 study shows that it is not the number of parties itself, but the way a party interacts with another that influences the magnitude and nature of affective polarization.

The vast majority of studies on elite polarization focus on legislative and deliberative bodies. For many years, political scientists measured polarization in the US by examining the ratings of party members published by interest groups, but now, most analyze roll-call voting patterns to investigate trends in party-line voting and party unity. Gentzkow, Shapiro, and Taddy used the text of the Congressional Record to document differences in speech patterns between Republicans and Democrats as a measure of polarization, finding a dramatic increase in polarized speech patterns starting in 1994.

=== Mass polarization ===
Mass polarization, or popular polarization, occurs when an electorate's attitudes towards political issues, policies, celebrated figures, or other citizens are neatly divided along party lines. At the extreme, each camp questions the moral legitimacy of the other, viewing the opposing camp and its policies as an existential threat to their way of life or the nation as a whole.

It can also may be influenced by common misperceptions of certain political views held by members of the opposite parties. Research particularly talked about by political scientists in which suggests that people may overestimate the ideological extreme of common supporters of the opposing party. This is because political leaders who receive more media attention are more likely to be more extreme than the average voter themselves. These common misperceptions can increase perceived policy differences, as well as can lead to certain negative feelings towards political opponents. Even when the differences in public opinion are less impactful than what people actually believe. Public frustration with the government performance, economic situation, and inequality can greatly impact and contribute to divisions, especially when certain political groups blame the opposing party for broader social problems.

There are multiple types or measures of mass polarization. Ideological polarization refers to the extent to which the electorate has divergent beliefs on ideological issues (e.g., abortion or affirmative action) or beliefs that are consistently conservative or liberal across a range of issues (e.g., having a conservative position on both abortion and affirmative action even if those positions are not "extreme"). Partisan sorting refers to the extent to which the electorate "sorts" or identifies with a party based on their ideological, racial, religious, gender, or other demographic characteristics. Affective polarization refers to the extent to which the electorate "dislikes" or "distrusts" those from other parties.

Political scientists who study mass polarization generally rely on data from opinion polls and election surveys. They look for trends in respondents' opinions on a given issue, their voting history, and their political ideology (conservative, liberal, moderate, etc.), and they try to relate those trends to respondents' party identification and other potentially polarizing factors (like geographic location or income bracket). Political scientists typically limit their inquiry to issues and questions that have been constant over time, in order to compare the present day to what the political climate has historically been. Some of 2020s studies also use decision-making games to measure the extent to which ingroup members discriminate outgroup members relative to their group members.

2020s academic work suggests that intolerance at the ideological extremes can lead to polarization with opinions more polarized than identities, intolerance among moderates improves cohesion. Some political scientists argue that polarization requires divergence on a broad range of issues, while others argue that only a few issues are required. Another debate involves the differentiation between issue extremism and issue alignment. Some scholars argue that polarization is defined as the growing distance in issue positions between two groups (issue extremism), while others suggest that the hallmark of polarization is the extent to which people's opinions systematically sort into different groups (e.g., parties), called issue alignment. The latter involves a systematic clustering of different positions in different groups, such that politics becomes a differentiating axis across many issues, lifestyle profiles, and demographics.

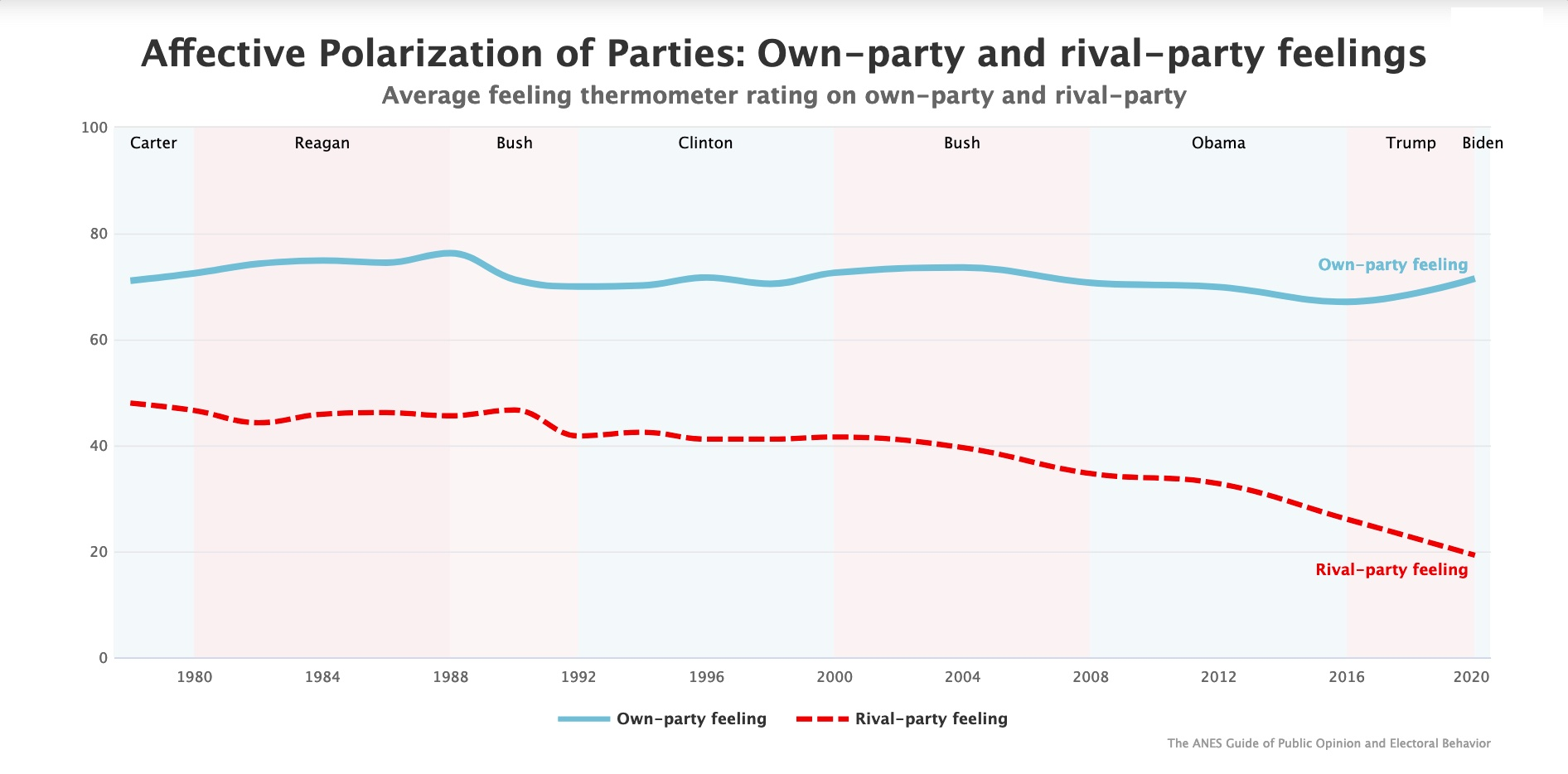
Affective polarization in the U.S. (1976–2020)

=== Affective polarization ===
Affective polarization refers to the phenomenon where individuals' feelings and emotions towards members of their own political party or group become more positive, while their feelings towards members of the opposing party or group become more negative. This can lead to increased hostility and a lack of willingness to compromise or work together with people who hold different political views. This phenomenon can be seen in both online and offline settings, and has been on the rise in several countries in the early 2020s. Affective polarization has been estimated via a variety of methods, including the Affective Polarization Scale and regression methods applied to social media data.

Affective polarization may lead to aggressive attitudes and behaviors toward members of other ideological groups within the same country. Extreme affective polarization may even lead to dangerous consequences like societal disintegration and ideological sorting. Affective polarization can be reduced by various means, such as feeling sadness together as a group (which often happens during Memorial Days). A high prevalence of respectful discussions with political others may also reduce affective polarization by increasing political tolerance and inter-party trust. High salience of a national common identity may also reduce affective polarization, as members of other parties are suddenly seen as in-group members.

== Causes ==
There are various causes of political polarization and these include political parties, redistricting, the public's political ideology, the mass media, political context and zero-sum thinking.

=== Party polarization ===
Some scholars argue that diverging parties has been one of the major driving forces of polarization as policy platforms have become more distant. This theory is based on 2010s trends in the United States Congress, where the majority party prioritizes the positions that are most aligned with its party platform and political ideology. The adoption of more ideologically distinct positions by political parties can cause polarization among both elites and the electorate. For example, after the passage of the Voting Rights Act, the number of conservative Democrats in Congress decreased, while the number of conservative Republicans increased. Within the electorate during the 1970s, Southern Democrats shifted toward the Republican Party, showing polarization among both the elites and the electorate of both main parties. In this sense, political polarization could be a top-down process, in which elite polarization leads to—or at least precedes—popular polarization; however, polarization among elites does not necessarily produce polarization within the electorate, and polarized electoral choices can often reflect elite polarization rather than voters' preferences.

Political scientists have shown politicians have an incentive to advance and support polarized positions. These argue that during the early 1990s, the Republican Party used polarizing tactics to become the majority party in the United States House of Representatives—which political scientists Thomas E. Mann and Norman Ornstein refer to as Newt Gingrich's "guerrilla war". What political scientists have found is that moderates are less likely to run than are candidates who are in line with party doctrine, otherwise known as "party fit". Other theories state that politicians who cater to more extreme groups within their party tend to be more successful, helping them stay in office while simultaneously pulling their constituency toward a polar extreme. A study by Nicholson found voters are more polarized by contentious statements from leaders of the opposing party than from the leaders of their own party. As a result, political leaders may be more likely to take polarized stances.

With regards to multi-party systems, Giovanni Sartori claims the splitting of ideologies in the public constituency causes further divides within the political parties of the countries. He theorizes that the extremism of public ideological movement is the basis for the creation of highly polarized multi-party systems. Sartori named this polarizing phenomenon polarized pluralism and claimed it would lead to further polarization in many opposing directions (as opposed to in simply two directions, as in a polarized two-party system) over policy issues. Polarization in multi-party systems can also be defined along two ideological extremes, like in the case of India in the 1970s. Ideological splits within a number of India's major parties resulted in two polarized coalitions on the right and left, each consisting of multiple political parties.

Political fund-raisers and donors can also exert significant influence and control over legislators. Party leaders are expected to be productive fund-raisers, in order to support the party's campaigns. Following Citizens United v. Federal Election Commission, special interests in the U.S. were able to greatly impact elections through increased undisclosed spending, notably through super political action committees. Some, such as Washington Post opinion writer Robert Kaiser, argued this allowed wealthy people, corporations, unions, and other groups to push the parties' policy platforms toward ideological extremes, resulting in a state of greater polarization. Other scholars, such as Raymond J. La Raja and David L. Wiltse, say that this does not necessarily hold true for mass donors to political campaigns. These scholars argue a single donor who is polarized and contributes large sums to a campaign does not seem to usually drive a politician toward political extremes.

=== The public ===
In democracies and other representative governments, citizens vote for the political actors who will represent them. Some scholars argue that political polarization reflects the public's ideology and voting preferences. Dixit and Weibull claim that political polarization is a natural and regular phenomenon. Party loyalism is a strong element of voters' thinking. Individuals who have higher political knowledge will not be influenced by anything a politician says. The polarization is merely a reflection of the party that the voter belongs to, and whichever direction it moves in. They argue that there is a link between public differences in ideology and the polarization of representatives, but that an increase in preference differences is usually temporary and ultimately results in compromise. Fernbach, Rogers, Fox and Sloman argue that it is a result of people having an exaggerated faith in their understanding of complex issues. Asking people to explain their policy preferences in detail typically resulted in more moderate views. Simply asking them to list the reasons for their preferences did not result in any such moderation.

Studies undertaken in the U.S. (2019) and the UK (2022) have found that political polarization is generally less acute among the public than is portrayed in the media. Moreover, non-nuanced reporting by the media about poll data and public opinions can even aggravate political polarization. Morris Fiorina posits the hypothesis that polarization is a phenomenon which does not hold for the public, and instead is formulated by commentators to draw further division in government. Fiorina connects this phenomenon to what he describes as "party sorting", which is where political ideologies tend to associate with specific political parties (conservatives with the Republican Party and liberals with the Democratic party). Other studies indicate that cultural differences focusing on ideological movements and geographical polarization within the United States constituency is correlated with rises in overall political polarization between 1972 and 2004.

Religious, ethnic, and other cultural divides within the public have often influenced the emergence of polarization. According to Layman et al., the ideological split between U.S. Republicans and Democrats also crosses into the religious cultural divide. They claim that Democrats have generally become more moderate in religious views whereas Republicans have become more traditionalist. For example, political scientists have shown that in the United States, voters who identify as Republican are more likely to vote for a strongly evangelical candidate than Democratic voters. This correlates with the rise in polarization in the United States. Another theory contends that religion does not contribute to full-group polarization, but rather, coalition and party activist polarization causes party shifts toward a political extreme.

In some post-colonial countries, the public may be polarized along ethnic divides that remain from the colonial regime. In South Africa in the late 1980s, members of the conservative, pro-apartheid National Party were no longer supportive of apartheid, and, therefore, no longer ideologically aligned with their party. Afrikaners, white English-speakers, and Indigenous Africans split based on racial divisions, causing polarization along ethnic lines. Economic inequality can also motivate the polarization of the public. For example, in post-World War I Germany, the Communist Party of Germany, and the National Socialists, a fascist party, emerged as the dominant political ideologies and proposed to address Germany's economic problems in drastically different ways. In Venezuela, in the late 20th century, presidential candidate Hugo Chávez used economic inequality in the country to polarize voters, employing a popular and aggressive tone to gain popularity.

=== The media ===
Also stated by Sheena Peckham, algorithms used by social media to operate creates an echo-chamber for the user causing selective exposure and thus leading to online hate, misinformation, malinformation and more (Peckham, 2023). A number of techniques were employed by the researchers and social scientist to trace the relationship between internet usage. Lelkes, along with his colleagues, use state right-of-way laws, which affect the cost of internet infrastructure, as an instrument used for internet access in their country, and discovered a positive relation between internet access and affective polarization in the country. At the same time, another experiment was conducted in which individuals in the US. were asked to deactivate their Facebook account for a $102 incentive, prior to the US. midterm election. It was found that those who deactivated their accounts and did not use Facebook were less polarized as compared to those individuals whose accounts were still activated during the experiment.

A separate 2026 pre-registered experiment conducted during the 2019 Argentine presidential debate found that temporarily removing Twitter access among recruited Twitter users did not reduce political polarization and instead produced a mild increase. The increase was larger among users whose online political environments were politically segregated.

In addition, Boxell assess ANEX data from 1972–2016 by age cohorts analyzing their likelihood of using social media. The study found that the largest polarization index occurred among the oldest cohort, which was less likely to use social media (Boxell et al., 2017). Thus, he found a small or negative relation between internet usage and polarization. Also, Markus Prior in his article tried to trace the causal link between social media and affective polarization but he found no evidence that partisan media are making ordinary American voters more partisan, thus negating the role of partisan media as a cause of affective polarization (Prior, 2013).

The mass media has grown as an institution over the past half-century. Political scientists argue that this has particularly affected the voting public in the last three decades, as previously less partisan viewers are given more polarized news media choices. The mass media's current, fragmented, high-choice environment has induced a movement of the audience from more even-toned political programming to more antagonistic and one-sided broadcasts and articles. Media bias charts can also visualize ideological differences among news outlets by placing sources along a left-to-right political spectrum, providing a spectrum, providing a simplified representation of partisan orientation within the media landscape. These programs tend to appeal to partisan viewers who watch the polarized programming as a self-confirming source for their ideologies.

Countries with less diversified but emerging media markets, such as China and South Korea, have become more polarized due to the diversification of political media. In addition, most search engines and social networks (e.g., Google, Facebook) now utilize computer algorithms as filters, which personalize web content based on a user's search history, location, and previous clicking patterns, creating more polarized access to information. This method of personalizing web content results in filter bubbles, a term coined by digital activist Eli Pariser that refers to the polarized ideological bubbles that are created by computer algorithms filtering out unrelated information and opposing views.

A 2011 study found ideological segregation of online news consumption is lower than the segregation of most offline news consumption and lower than the segregation of face-to-face interactions. This suggests that the filter bubbles effects of online media consumption are exaggerated. Other research also shows that online media does not contribute to the increased polarization of opinions. Solomon Messing and Sean J. Westwood state that individuals do not necessarily become polarized through media because they choose their own exposure, which tends to already align with their views. For instance, in an experiment where people could choose the content they wanted, people did not start to dislike their political opponents more after selecting between pro- or anti-immigration content; however, people started to counterargue the content.

Academic studies found that providing people with impartial, objective information has the potential to reduce political polarization, but the effect of information on polarization is highly sensitive to contextual factors. Specifically, polarization over government spending was reduced when people were provided with a "Taxpayer Receipt," but not when they were also asked how they wanted the money to be spent. This suggests that subtle factors like the mood and tone of partisan news sources may have a large effect on how the same information is interpreted. This is confirmed by another study that shows that different emotions of messages can lead to polarization or convergence: joy is prevalent in emotional polarization, while sadness and fear play significant roles in emotional convergence. These findings can help to design more socially responsible algorithms by starting to focus on the emotional content of algorithmic recommendations. Research has primarily focused on the United States, a country with high polarization that has also increased over time. In Sweden, there is a stable ideological polarization over time. Experiments and surveys from Sweden also give limited support to the idea of increased ideological or affective polarization due to media use.

=== Political context ===
Some 2020s studies emphasize the role of electoral context and the way parties interact with each other. For example, a 2023 study shows that coalition partnership can moderate the extent of affective polarization over parties; however, this study does not find evidence that the number of political parties and district magnitude that captures the proportionality of electoral systems would influence the extent of affective polarization. Electoral context, such as electoral salience, involvement in elections, elite polarization, and the strength of Eurosceptic parties, can also intensify the divide. Furthermore, while earlier literature suggested that political tensions peak during campaigns and subside afterward, a 2024 study analyzing the 2022 United States elections found that partisan animosity remained durable and consistently high post-election, regardless of whether a voter's preferred candidate won or lost. The impact of redistricting (potentially through gerrymandering or the manipulation of electoral borders to favor a political party) on political polarization in the United States has been found to be minimal in research by leading political scientists. Ranked-choice voting has also been put forward as a solution to political polarization. When politicians repeatedly favor partisan media outlets, they reinforce their supporters' existing biases, which can further fuel political polarization within the public.

== Consequences ==
The implications of political polarization "are not entirely clear and may include some benefits as well as detrimental consequences." Polarization can be benign, natural, and democratizing, or it can be pernicious, having long term malignant effects on society and congesting essential democratic functions. Where voters see the parties as less divergent, they are less likely to be satisfied with how their democracy works. While its exact effects are disputed, it clearly alters the political process and the political composition of the general public.

=== Pernicious polarization ===
In political science, pernicious polarization occurs when a single political cleavage overrides other divides and commonalities to the point it has boiled into a single divide which becomes entrenched and self-reinforcing. Unlike most types of polarization, pernicious polarization does not need to be ideological. Rather, pernicious polarization operates on a single political cleavage, which can be partisan identity, religious vs secular, globalist vs nationalist, urban vs rural, etc. This political divide creates an explosion of mutual group distrust which hardens between the two political parties (or coalitions) and spreads beyond the political sphere into societal relations. People begin to perceive politics as "us" vs "them." The office of Ombudsman of Argentina has been vacant since 2009, along with a companion Public Defender's office, allegedly because of pernicious polarization.

==== Causes ====
According to Carothers & O'Donohue (2019), pernicious polarization is a process most often driven by a single political cleavage dominating an otherwise pluralistic political life, overriding other cleavages. On the other hand, Slater & Arugay (2019) have argued that it's not the depth of a single social cleavage, but the political elite's process for removing a leader which best explains whether or not polarization truly becomes pernicious. Lebas & Munemo (2019) have argued pernicious polarization is marked by both deeper societal penetration and segregation than other forms of political polarization, making it less amenable to resolution; however, it is agreed that pernicious polarization reinforces and entrenches itself, dragging the country into a downward spiral of anger and division for which there are no easy remedies.

==== Social media and Political Polarization ====
Social media can also contribute to political polarization by exposing users to certain information that supports their own existing political views and or beliefs. Which individuals often seek and get news and certain commentary that aligns with their own views, while social medias algorithm often recommend similar content that is based off of their previous activity on those sources. This selective exposure can and does limit exposure to opposing perspectives and make more extreme political positions more common than they actually are in reality. Research on political polarization has showed that media bubbles, in-group bias, and the spreading of misinformation as factors that support divisions between political groups and their ideas.

==== Effect on governance ====
Pernicious polarization makes compromise, consensus, interaction, and tolerance increasingly costly and tenuous for individuals and political actors on both sides of the divide. Pernicious polarization routinely weakens respect for democratic norms, corrodes basic legislative processes, undermines the nonpartisan nature of the judiciary and fuels public disaffection with political parties. It exacerbates intolerance and discrimination, diminishes societal trust, and increases violence throughout the society. As well as potentially leading to democratic backsliding. In country-by-country instances of pernicious polarization, it is common to see the winner exclude the loser from positions of power or using means to prevent the loser from becoming a threat in the future. In these situations, the loser typically questions the legitimacy of the institutions allowing the winner to create a hegemony, which causes citizens to grow cynical towards politics. In these countries, politics is often seen as a self-referential power game that has nothing to do with people.

==== Effect on democratic decision-making ====
Political polarization can have a drastic effect on the democratic decision-making process by reducing the number of diverse and the number of perspectives considered within the political debate. When political identities become more divided into opposing sides, individuals and institutions may interpret certain public issues mainly through the perspectives associated with their own group. Which can limit the range of problems that receive certain attention and narrows the information, as well as the arguments considered when developing public policy. Political scientists argue that this deduction in perspective diversity can actually itself weaken a democratic system's own ability to self-identify and address problems of public concern.

==== Effect on public trust ====
Perniciously polarized societies often witness public controversies over factually provable questions. During this process, facts and moral truths increasingly lose their weight, as more people conform to the messages of their own bloc. Social and political actors such as journalists, academics, and politicians either become engaged in partisan storytelling or else incur growing social, political, and economic costs. Electorates lose confidence in public institutions. Support for norms and democracy decline. It becomes increasingly difficult for people to act in a morally principled fashion by appealing to the truth or acting in line with one's values when it conflicts with one's party interests. Once pernicious polarization takes hold, it takes on a life of its own, regardless of earlier intentions.

=== Benefits of polarization ===
Several political scientists have argued that most types of political polarization are beneficial to democracy, as well as a natural feature. The simplifying features of polarization can help democratization. Strategies which depend on opposition and exclusion are present in all forms of observed politics. Political polarization can help transform or disrupt the status quo, sometimes addressing injustices or imbalances in a popular vs. oligarchic struggle.

Political polarization can serve to unify, invigorate, or mobilize potential allies at the elite and mass levels. It can also help to divide, weaken, or pacify competitors. Even the most celebrated social movements can be described as a "group of people involved in a conflict with clearly defined opponents having a conflictual orientation toward an opponent and a common identity." Political polarization can also provide voting heuristics to help voters choose among candidates, enabling political parties to mobilize supporters and provide programmatic choices. Polarizing politics can also help to overcome internal differences and frame a common identity, based in part on a common opposition to those resisting reforms. Still, polarization can be a risky political tool even when intended as an instrument of democratization, as it risks turning pernicious and self-propagating.

== See also ==
- Adversarial collaboration – Method of research
- Bipolarisation
- Civil war – War within a country
- Contentious politics – Disruptive action oriented to change
- Cultural pluralism – In contrast
- False dilemma – Informal fallacy involving falsely limited alternatives
- Hate speech – Speech that expresses hatred towards individuals or groups
- Horseshoe theory – Posited similarity of the far-left and far-right in politics
- Ideocracy – State governed by a particular ideology
- Ideological Turing test – In contrast
- Left–right politics – System of classifying political positions
- Moral foundations theory – Theory in social psychology
- Multi-party system – Political system with three or more parties
- Outrage industrial complex – Media increasing engagement through outrage
- Political stability – Smoothly functioning political system
- Pillarisation – Division of civil society along religio-political lines
- Social polarization – Segregation of society into different social groups
- State collapse – Catastrophic government dissolution
- Urban–rural political divide – Phenomenon in political science

=== Groups and Work ===
- Allsides – Rates online written news outlets for political bias
- Braver Angels – American nonprofit organization
- Bridge the Divide – Youth political organization
- Citizens for Civil Discourse
- Heterodox Academy – American nonprofit advocacy group
- One America Initiative
- Problem Solvers Caucus – Bipartisan group of U.S. representatives
- Resetting the Table – Political mediation organization
- Seeds of Peace – US-based non-profit organization
- The Better Arguments Project – Aspen Institute, Allstate, and Facing History and Ourselves
