= Partisan sorting =

Political effect where voters sort themselves into parties that match their ideology

Partisan sorting is an effect in politics in which voters sort themselves into parties that match their ideology. Partisan sorting is distinct from political polarization, which is where partisans subscribe to increasingly extreme positions. As political scientist Nolan McCarty explains, "party sorting can account for the increased differences across partisans even if the distribution of...attitudes in the population remains unchanged or moves uniformly in one direction or the other." As an example given by McCarty, the gap between the Democratic Party and Republican Party on views towards immigrants strengthening the country with hard work and talents has widened from a 2-point gap in 1994 to a 42-point gap in 2017. A reasonable explanation is that of partisan sorting: those who are pro-immigrant shifted into the Democratic party and immigration-restrictions have shifted towards the Republican party. According to McCarty, this explains the widening gap between the two parties, considering how pro-immigration viewpoints between the two surveys have increased by 35% since 1994.

== Applications and forms ==
Partisan sorting is used as a potential explainer for how in recent decades the Democratic Party has become more liberal while the Republican Party has become more conservative. One school of thought led by Morris Fiorina concludes that most of the change comes from ideological partisan sorting, with polarization having little effect or being solely limited to political elites. Conversely, another school of thought led by Alan Abramowitz challenges this and says sorting itself is a reflection of political polarization and that both the elites and the public have become increasingly polarized.

A form of partisan sorting is geographic sorting, which alleges that people decide to move into communities that match their party. Research by political scientists in 2012 found that people prefer to relocate to areas with copartisans, though it was unclear whether it was a central or secondary factor. Research conducted in 2016 concluded that political compatibility is not a significant factor in deciding where to live.

== See also ==
- Clustering (demographics)
- Foot voting
