= Morris Fiorina =

American political scientist

Morris P. Fiorina
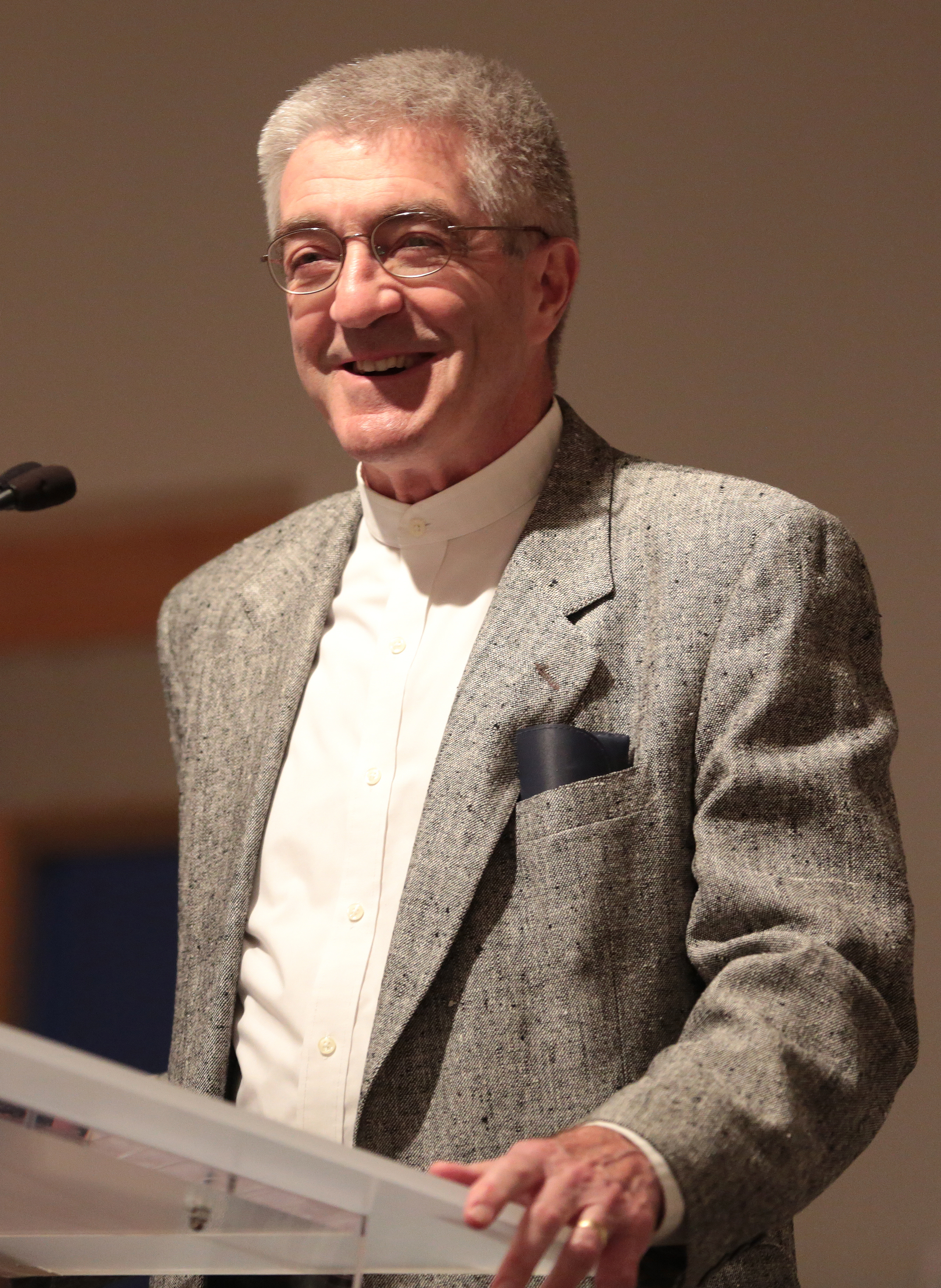
- Fiorina in 2017.
- Born: 1946 (age 79–80)
- Education: University of Rochester; Allegheny College
- Scientific career
- Fields: Political science

Morris P. Fiorina (born 1946) is an American political scientist and co-author of the book Culture War? The Myth of a Polarized America with Jeremy C. Pope (Brigham Young University).

== Biography ==
Fiorina received his B.A. from Allegheny College, and his M.A. and Ph.D. from the University of Rochester. He currently serves as the Wendt Family Professor of Political Science, and is a senior fellow at Stanford University's Hoover Institution. He was formerly the Thompson Professor of Government at Harvard University and has taught at the California Institute of Technology. He resides in Portola Valley, California.

== Selected works ==
- Disconnect: The Breakdown of Representation in American Politics
- Culture War? The Myth of a Polarized America
- Congress: Keystone of the Washington Establishment
- Divided Government
- America's New Democracy
- Personal Vote
- Retrospective Voting in American National Elections
