= CamelPhat discography =

This is the discography of English DJ and production duo CamelPhat, consisting of Dave Whelan and Mike Di Scala.

== Studio albums ==
Title	Details	Peak chart positions					Certifications
Title	Details	UK	UK Dance	UK Indie	IRE	SCO	Certifications
Dark Matter	Released: 30 October 2020; Label: Sony, CamelPhat; Formats: CD, LP, digital download, streaming	23	1	—	39	38	BPI: Silver
Spiritual Milk	Released: 15 September 2023; Label: Sony, CamelPhat; Formats: CD, LP, digital download, streaming	— (Note: Spiritual Milk did not enter the UK Albums Chart, but peaked at number 82 on the UK Album Sales Chart.)	3	39	—	—	
"—" denotes releases that did not chart

== Extended plays ==
- Global (2010) (as Whelan & Di Scala)
- Made in Italy (2010) (as Whelan & Di Scala)
- Kill the VIP (2010)
- Vice Summer 2011 (2011) (as Shake n' Jack)
- Outta Body (2012)
- Watergate (2012)
- One Hump or Two (2012)
- Art of Work (2015)
- Get Sick (2015)
- Light Night (2016) (Note: "Make 'Em Dance" from Light Night EP did not enter Ultratop 50, but peaked at No. 12 on the Ultratop Dance Bubbling Under chart.)
- Higher (2016)
- Deets (2017)
- Hangin' with Charlie (2017) (Note: "Hangin' Out with Charlie" from Hangin' with Charlie EP did not enter Ultratop 50, but peaked at No. 6 on the Ultratop Dance Bubbling Under chart.)
- Gypsy King (2017)
- Monsters (2017)
- House Dawgs (2017)
- Bang 2 Drum (2017) (with Mat.Joe)
- Revisited (2017)
- Crystal Clear (2019) (with Riva Starr)

== Singles ==
Title	Year	Peak chart positions										Certifications	Album
Title	Year	UK	AUS	BEL (FL)	BEL (WA)	FRA	GER	HUN	IRE	SCO	US Dance	Certifications	Album
"Shot Away" (as Pawn Shop)	2006	100	—	—	—	—	—	—	—	83	—		Non-album singles
"Love Comes Quickly" (as Whelan & Di Scala)	2006	—	—	—	—	—	—	—	—	—	—		Non-album singles
"Teardrops" (as Whelan & Di Scala featuring Nikki Belle)	2007	—	—	—	—	—	—	—	—	—	—		Non-album singles
"Sunset to Sunrise" (as Whelan & Di Scala featuring Nikki Belle)	2007	—	—	—	—	—	—	—	—	—	—		Non-album singles
"Never Let Go" (as Whelan & Di Scala)	2008	—	—	—	—	—	—	—	—	—	—		Non-album singles
"Berlin" (as Whelan & Di Scala)	2008	—	—	—	—	—	—	—	—	—	—		Non-album singles
"Outta Time" (as Whelan & Di Scala featuring Abigail Bailey)	2008	—	—	—	—	—	—	—	—	—	—		Non-album singles
"Discoshit" (as Whelan & Di Scala)	2008	—	—	—	—	—	—	—	—	—	—		Non-album singles
"Sleepwalk" (as Whelan & Di Scala)	2008	—	—	—	—	—	—	—	—	—	—		Non-album singles
"Waterfall" (as Whelan & Di Scala with Oliver Lang)	2008	—	—	—	—	—	—	—	—	—	—		Non-album singles
"Close My Eyes" (as Whelan & Di Scala)	2008	—	—	—	—	—	—	—	—	—	—		Non-album singles
"Always on My Mind" (as Wheels & Disco)	2008	—	—	—	—	—	—	—	—	—	—		Non-album singles
"Nu Skool" (as Shake n' Jack)	2008	—	—	—	—	—	—	—	—	—	—		Non-album singles
"Good Times" (as Wheels & Disco featuring Mighty Marvin)	2009	—	—	—	—	—	—	—	—	—	—		Non-album singles
"Curves n' Corners" (as Whelan & Di Scala)	2009	—	—	—	—	—	—	—	—	—	—		Non-album singles
"Virgil" (as Whelan & Di Scala vs. Oliver Lang)	2009	—	—	—	—	—	—	—	—	—	—		Non-album singles
"Persil" (as Whelan & Di Scala vs. Oliver Lang)	2009	—	—	—	—	—	—	—	—	—	—		Non-album singles
"Sun Shine Down" (as Wheels & Disco featuring Mighty Marvin)	2009	—	—	—	—	—	—	—	—	—	—		Non-album singles
"Cuba" (as Whelan & Di Scala)	2009	—	—	—	—	—	—	—	—	—	—		Non-album singles
"Breath Away" (as Whelan & Di Scala featuring Abigail Bailey)	2009	—	—	—	—	—	—	—	—	—	—		Non-album singles
"Lexar" (as Whelan & Di Scala)	2010	—	—	—	—	—	—	—	—	—	—		Non-album singles
"Achilles" (as Whelan & Di Scala)	2010	—	—	—	—	—	—	—	—	—	—		Non-album singles
"Lose Control" (as Mancini)	2010	—	—	—	—	—	—	—	—	—	—		Non-album singles
"Can You Dig It"	2010	—	—	—	—	—	—	—	—	—	—		Non-album singles
"Nimbus" (as Whelan & Di Scala)	2010	—	—	—	—	—	—	—	—	—	—		Non-album singles
"Girl on Girl"	2011	—	—	—	—	—	—	—	—	—	—		Non-album singles
"The Fox" (as Whelan & Di Scala)	2012	—	—	—	—	—	—	—	—	—	—		Non-album singles
"Rubin" (as Whelan & Di Scala)	2012	—	—	—	—	—	—	—	—	—	—		Non-album singles
"Here I Come" (as Whelan & Di Scala with Sebastien Drums featuring Mitch Crown)	2012	—	—	—	—	—	—	—	—	—	—		Non-album singles
"Open Up Your Heart" (as Whelan & Di Scala featuring Eden)	2013	—	—	—	—	—	—	—	—	—	—		Non-album singles
"Live for the Music" (featuring Erire)	2013	—	—	—	—	—	—	—	—	—	—		Non-album singles
"Thanks for the Memories" (as Whelan & Di Scala featuring Eden)	2013	—	—	—	—	—	—	—	—	—	—		Non-album singles
"Funky Express" (as Whelan & Di Scala with Sebastien Drums)	2013	—	—	—	—	—	—	—	—	—	—		Non-album singles
"Rest of Your Life" (as Whelan & Di Scala featuring Matthew Sleeper)	2014	—	—	—	—	—	—	—	—	—	—		Non-album singles
"The Act"	2014	—	—	— (Note: "The Act" did not enter Flanders Ultratop 50, but peaked at No. 13 on the Ultratip Bubbling Under chart.)	—	—	—	—	—	—	—		Non-album singles
"Sun Comes Up" (featuring Jaxxon)	2014	—	—	—	—	—	—	—	—	—	—		Non-album singles
"Paradigm" (featuring A*M*E)	2015	—	—	—	—	—	—	—	—	—	—		Non-album singles
"Siren Song" (featuring Eden)	2015	—	—	—	—	—	—	—	—	—	—		Non-album singles
"Constellations"	2015	—	—	—	—	—	—	—	—	—	—		Non-album singles
"Paths" (with Redondo)	2016	—	—	—	—	—	—	—	—	—	—		Non-album singles
"Trip"	2016	—	—	—	—	—	—	—	—	—	—		Non-album singles
"It Is What It Is"	2016	—	—	—	—	—	—	—	—	—	—		Non-album singles
"The Quad"	2016	—	—	—	—	—	—	—	—	—	—		Non-album singles
"NYP2"	2017	—	—	—	—	—	—	—	—	—	—		Non-album singles
"Cola" (with Elderbrook)	2017	18	32	23	32	40	76	5	12	15	21 (Note: "Cola" also peaked at No. 1 on the Billboard Dance Club Songs chart and No. 7 on the Dance Mix/Show Airplay chart.)	BPI: 2× Platinum; ARIA: 4× Platinum; BEA: Gold; BVMI: Gold	Dark Matter
"Bugged Out" (with Audio Bullys)	2018	—	—	—	—	—	—	—	—	—	—		Non-album single
"Panic Room" (with Au/Ra)	2018	30	—	37	— (Note: "Panic Room" did not enter Wallonie Ultratop 50, but peaked at No. 20 on the Ultratip Bubbling Under chart in Wallonia.)	—	—	—	40	19	27 (Note: "Panic Room" also peaked at No. 49 on the Billboard Dance Club Songs chart and No. 3 on the Dance Mix/Show Airplay chart.)	BPI: Platinum	Dark Matter
"Dopamine Machine" (with Ali Love)	2018	—	—	— (Note: "Dopamine Machine" did not enter Flanders Ultratop 50, but did register on Ultratip Bubbling Under chart.)	—	—	—	—	—	—	—		Non-album single
"The Solution"	2018	—	—	—	—	—	—	—	—	—	—		Non-album single
"Drop It"	2018	—	—	—	—	—	—	—	—	—	—		Non-album single
"Accelerator" (with Solardo)	2018	—	—	—	—	—	—	—	—	—	—		Non-album single
"Breathe" (with Cristoph featuring Jem Cooke)	2018	36	—	47	— (Note: "Breathe" did not enter the Wallinie Ultratop 50, but peaked at No. 7 on the Ultratip Bubbling Under chart in Wallonia.)	—	—	32	68	18	40 (Note: "Breathe" also peaked at No. 21 on the Billboard Dance Club Songs chart and No. 3 on the Dance Mix/Show Airplay chart.)	BPI: Platinum	Dark Matter
"Kona" / "Liberation" (with Alan Fitzpatrick)	2019	—	—	—	—	—	—	—	—	—	—		Non-album single
"Be Someone" (with Jake Bugg)	2019	58	—	— (Note: "Be Someone" did not enter the Flanders Ultratop 50, but peaked at No. 10 on the Ultratip Bubbling Under chart.)	— (Note: "Be Someone" did not enter the Wallonie Ultratop 50, but peaked at No. 30 on the Wallonie Ultratip Bubbling Under chart.)	—	—	—	71	26	25 (Note: "Be Someone" also peaked at No. 2 on the Billboard Dance Club Songs chart.)	BPI: Silver	Dark Matter
"Rabbit Hole" (featuring Jem Cooke)	2019	81	—	— (Note: "Rabbit Hole" did not enter Flanders Ultratop 50, but peaked at No. 8 on the Ultratip Bubbling Under chart.)	—	—	—	—	80	30	23 (Note: "Rabbit Hole" also peaked at No. 1 on the Billboard Dance Club Songs chart.)	BPI: Silver	Dark Matter
"Freak" (featuring Cari Golden)	2020	—	—	—	—	—	—	—	—	—	—		Non-album single
"For a Feeling" (with Artbat featuring Rhodes)	2020	—	—	— (Note: "For a Feeling" did not enter the Flanders Ultratop 50, but peaked at No. 23 on the Ultratip Bubbling Under chart.)	—	—	—	—	—	—	—		Dark Matter
"Hypercolour" (with Yannis Philippakis of Foals)	2020	77	—	— (Note: "Hypercolour" did not enter the Flanders Ultratop 50, but peaked at No. 15 on the Ultratip Bubbling Under chart.)	—	—	—	—	—	39	—		Dark Matter
"Witching Hour" (with Will Easton)	2020	—	—	—	—	—	—	—	—	—	—		Dark Matter
"Critical" (with Green Velvet)	2021	—	—	— (Note: "Critical" did not enter Flanders Ultratop 50, but did register on Ultratip Bubbling Under chart.)	—	—	—	—	—	—	—		Non-album singles
"The Future" (with Rebūke)	2021	—	—	—	—	—	—	—	—	—	—		Non-album singles
"Silenced" (with Jem Cooke)	2022	— (Note: "Silenced" did not enter the UK Singles Chart, but peaked at number 42 on the UK Singles Sales Chart.)	—	—	—	—	—	—	—	—	—		Dark Matter
"Believe" (with Mathame)	2022	—	—	—	—	—	—	—	—	—	—		Non-album single
"The Sign" (with Anyma)	2022	—	—	—	—	—	—	—	—	—	—		Spiritual Milk
"Your Mind" (with Josh Gigante)	2023	—	—	—	—	—	—	—	—	—	—		Non-album single
"Secrets" (with Sub Focus, Rhodes and Culture Shock)	2023	—	—	—	—	—	—	—	—	—	—		Evolve
"Hope" (with Max Milner)	2023	—	—	—	—	—	—	—	—	—	—		Spiritual Milk
"Higher" (with London Grammar)	2023	—	—	—	—	—	—	—	—	—	—		Spiritual Milk
"Running Man"	2024	—	—	—	—	—	—	—	—	—	—		Non-album single
"Shelter" (with Innellea & Monolink)	2024	—	—	—	—	—	—	—	—	—	—		The Belonging
"Endlessly" (with Nadia Ali)	2024	—	—	—	—	—	—	—	—	—	—		Non-album singles
"Bado" (with Shimza and Idd Aziz)	2024	—	—	—	—	—	—	—	—	—	—		Non-album singles
"Oblivion" (with Massano featuring Nu-La)	2024	—	—	—	—	—	—	—	—	—	—		Natural
"Needed You" (with Vomee)	2025	—	—	—	—	—	—	—	—	—	—		Non-album single
"Waste My Time" (with Kölsch)	2025	—	—	—	—	—	—	—	—	—	—		Kinema
"Sunshine"	2025	—	—	—	—	—	—	—	—	—	—		Non-album singles
"Destino" (with Zafrir)	2025	—	—	—	—	—	—	—	—	—	—		Non-album singles
"Save Me" (with Marten Lou)	2025	—	—	—	—	—	—	—	—	—	—		Non-album singles
"The One" (with Josh Gigante)	2025	—	—	—	—	—	—	—	—	—	—		Non-album singles
"Goddess" (with Kotiēr and Yellowitz)	2025	—	—	—	—	—	—	—	—	—	—		Non-album singles
"Cycles" (with Arodes)	2026	—	—	—	—	—	—	—	—	—	—		Non-album singles
"So Good" (with Josh Gigante featuring Kuuda)	2026	— (Note: "So Good" did not enter the UK Singles Chart, but peaked at number 57 on the UK Singles Sales Chart.)	—	—	—	—	—	—	—	—	—		Non-album singles
"—" denotes a recording that did not chart or was not released in that territory.

=== Other charted songs ===
Title	Year	Peak chart positions							Album
Title	Year	UK Sales	UK Dance	BEL (FL) Tip	CIS	NZ Hot	RUS	SCO	Album
"Cola" (Robin Schulz remix)	2017	—	—	—	73	—	35	—	"Cola" single
"Easier" (featuring Lowes)	2020	35	28	27	—	7	—	—	Dark Matter
"Not Over Yet" (featuring Noel Gallagher)	2020	63	—	—	—	—	—	56	Dark Matter
"—" denotes a recording that did not chart or was not released in that territory.

== Remixes ==
Title	Year	Artist(s)
"Love Commandments" ("Love Commandments" by the Bassline Hustlers)	2004	Gisele Jackson
"Lola's Theme" (Lola Does High Society remix)	2004	Shapeshifters
"Venus" ("Venus" by Men from Mars featuring Shocking Blue)	2004	Shocking Blue
"Enjoy the Silence" ("All I Ever Wanted" by Da Mode)	2004	Depeche Mode
"Take Me Out" ("Take Me Out" by Da Mode)	2004	Franz Ferdinand
"Rocker" ("Altered Egos" by Da Mode)	2004	Alter Ego
"Waiting for You" (Dave Whelan & Di Scala remix)	2006	Narcotic Thrust
"Exceeder" (Whelan & Di Scala remix)	2006	Mason
"Running Up That Hill" ("Boosh" by Whelan & Di Scala)	2006	Kate Bush
"Spaced" ("Spaced Out" by Whelan & Di Scala)	2006	Lock & Burns
"I Feel Love" (Whelan & Di Scala remix)	2007	Public Domain featuring Lucia Holm
"Sugar (Sweet Thing)" (Dave Whelan & Di Scala remix)	2007	DYAD10
"Hit Girl" (Whelan & Di Scala remix)	2007	Sébastien Léger
"I Wish U Would" (Whelan & Di Scala remix)	2007	Martijn ten Velden
"Café del Mar" (Whelan & Di Scala remix)	2007	Energy 52
"Da Funk" ("Funk" by Wheels & Disco)	2008	Daft Punk
"Vamp" ("The Vamp" by Whelan & Di Scala)	2008	Outlander
"The Real Thing" (Whelan & Di Scala remix)	2008	Tony Di Bart
"Need in Me" (Whelan & Di Scala remix)	2008	Danny Dove and Steve Smart featuring Amanda Wilson
"Work It Out" (Whelan & Di Scala remix)	2008	DJ Disciple featuring Dawn Tallman
"Your Ways" (Whelan & Di Scala remix)	2008	E-Play
"Uninvited" (Whelan & Di Scala remix)	2008	Freemasons featuring Bailey Tzuke
"Disco's Revenge 2008" (Whelan & Di Scala remix)	2008	Gusto
"Cruising" (Whelan & Di Scala remix)	2008	Nalin & Kane and Denis the Menace
"I Know You're Gone" (Whelan & Di Scala remix)	2008	Max Graham featuring Jessica Jacobs
"No Stopping Us" (Whelan & Di Scala remix)	2008	Kic Pimpz
"Rolex Sweep" (Whelan & Di Scala remix)	2008	Skepta
"White Horse" (Whelan & Di Scala remix)	2008	Sarah McLeod
"Never Enough" (Whelan & Di Scala remix)	2008	Crystal Waters
"My Girl" (Whelan & Di Scala remix)	2008	Jason Herd and Flashlight featuring Jason Heerah
"Times Like These" (Whelan & Di Scala remix)	2009	Albin Myers
"All for a Dance" (Whelan & Di Scala remix)	2009	Moonbeam
"Ride on Time" ("Black Sensation" by Whelan & Di Scala)	2009	Black Box
"Every Other Way" (Whelan & Di Scala remix)	2009	BT
"Keep on Jumpin'" (Whelan & Di Scala remix)	2010	Stefy De Cicco featuring Tom Stone
"In and Out of Love" (Whelan & Di Scala remix)	2010	Armin van Buuren featuring Sharon den Adel
"Old Skool Generation" (Whelan & Di Scala remix)	2010	Tommy Vee and Mauro Ferrucci
"We No Speak Americano" (Whelan & Di Scala remix)	2010	Yolanda Be Cool and DCUP
"Faceless" (Whelan & Di Scala remix)	2010	Kevin Andrews and Felix Baumgartner
"Louder (Put Your Hands Up)" (Whelan & Di Scala remix)	2010	Chris Willis
"Special One" (Whelan & Di Scala remix)	2010	Ginger Woz Red and Sasha Solette
"Kuraitani" (Whelan & Di Scala remix)	2010	Dean Newton
"Porto Alegre" (Whelan & Di Scala remix)	2010	Lishious and Antonio Carnicero
"I'm Alive" (Whelan & Di Scala remix)	2010	Don Fardon
"My Feelings for You" (Whelan & Di Scala remix)	2010	Avicii and Sebastien Drums
"Street Dancer" (Whelan & Di Scala remix)	2011	Avicii
"Shine" (Whelan & Di Scala remix)	2011	Alisa
"In the Cloud" (Whelan & Di Scala remix)	2011	CeCe Rogers featuring Serena
"Sharing" (Whelan & Di Scala remix)	2011	Tommy Vee and Mauro Ferrucci presents Luca Guerrieri
"Give It to Me" (Whelan & Di Scala remix)	2011	Those Usual Suspects featuring Jay Sebag
"Fly Again" (Whelan & Di Scala remix)	2012	Sebastien Drums featuring Mitch Crown
"Cosmopolitan" (CamelPhat remix)	2012	Marc Poppcke
"We Could Be One" (Whelan & Di Scala remix)	2012	Dirty Laundry
"Amnesia" (Whelan & Di Scala remix)	2012	Ian Carey & Rosette featuring Timbaland & Brasco
"Make You Feel" (Oliver Lang & Whelan & Di Scala remix)	2012	Dada & Mat Frost
"My Religion" (Oliver Lang & Whelan & Di Scala remix)	2012	Sonikross featuring Sara K
"Fox & Koi" (Whelan & Di Scala remix)	2012	Global Experience
"Abash" (Sebastien Drums & Whelan & Di Scala remix)	2012	Rob Adans
"Let's Go All In" (Whelan & Di Scala remix)	2012	Bobby Vena & Andy Murphy featuring Livingstone
"Restless" (CamelPhat remix)	2013	D. Ramirez and Cevin Fisher
"Strutt" (CamelPhat remix)	2014	Kydus
"In Stereo" (CamelPhat remix)	2014	Flip Flop featuring Faith Trent
"Parachute" (CamelPhat remix)	2014	Otto Knows
"Special" (CamelPhat remix)	2014	Billon featuring Maxine Ashley
"Dancing in the Dark" (CamelPhat remix)	2015	4Tune500
"Wurd" (CamelPhat remix)	2015	Robosonic featuring Stag
"Younger" (CamelPhat remix)	2015	Seinabo Sey
"Stronger" (CamelPhat dark dub remix)	2015	Clean Bandit
"Better Love" (CamelPhat remix)	2015	Foxes
"Creeper" (CamelPhat remix)	2016	Alex Metric
"Dancing Makes Us Brave" (CamelPhat remix)	2016	Nimmo
"Moments" (CamelPhat remix)	2016	Kidnap featuring Leo Stannard
"Give Up the Ghost" (CamelPhat remix)	2016	Ariana and the Rose
"Wolliner" (CamelPhat remix)	2016	Erik Hagleton
"Strings" (CamelPhat remix)	2016	Illyus & Barrientos
"Warehouse" (CamelPhat remix)	2016	Fat Sushi
"My Love 4 U" (CamelPhat remix)	2016	MK featuring A*M*E
"Hell in Paradise 2016" (CamelPhat remix)	2016	ONO
"Reach for Me" (CamelPhat remix)	2017	Mark Jenkyns featuring Mizbee
"Hulk" (CamelPhat remix)	2017	DJ Wady and Patrick M
"Please Don't Play" (CamelPhat remix)	2017	James Curd and Diz
"Say Nothing" (CamelPhat remix)	2017	MUTO featuring Emerson Leif
"Right Here, Right Now" (CamelPhat remix)	2018	Fatboy Slim
"These Days" (CamelPhat remix)	2018	Rudimental featuring Jess Glynne, Macklemore and Dan Caplen
"Boys in da Hood" (CamelPhat remix)	2018	Wade
"Hang Up Your Hang Ups (The Only One)" (CamelPhat remix)	2018	Paul Woolford featuring Kim English
"Crawl" (CamelPhat remix)	2018	Lee Foss featuring SPNCR and Mal Rainey
"Piece of Me" (CamelPhat remix)	2018	MK and Becky Hill
"Coup de Grace" (CamelPhat remix)	2019	Miles Kane
"I'm Not Alone 2019" (CamelPhat remix)	2019	Calvin Harris
"Days Go By" (CamelPhat remix)	2019	Dirty Vegas
"Lose Your Head" (CamelPhat remix)	2021	London Grammar
"Best of Me" (CamelPhat remix)	2021	Artbat and Sailor & I
"Warning Signs" (CamelPhat remix)	2021	Alan Fitzpatrick and Lawrence Hart
"Float Away" (CamelPhat remix)	2021	Yousef and The Angel
"Distorted Light Beam" (CamelPhat remix)	2021	Bastille
"Tighter" (CamelPhat remix)	2021	Hosh featuring Jalja
"Magic Me" (CamelPhat remix)	2022	Eldon
"Night After Night" (CamelPhat remix)	2023	Fideles

== Production and songwriting credits ==
Title	Year	Artist(s)	Credit(s)
"My Love 4 U"	2016	MK featuring A*M*E	Keyboards, production, programming, songwriting
"17"	2017	MK	Keyboards, production, programming, songwriting
"The Power"	2019	Duke Dumont featuring Zak Abel	Production, songwriting
"Space"	2020	Becky Hill	Production, songwriting
"5 Seconds Before Sunrise"	2020	VER:WEST	Production, songwriting
"Body"	2021	Elderbrook	Production, programming, songwriting
"Love Devine"	2021	Riva Starr featuring Phebe Edwards	Production, songwriting
"Chemical"	2021	MK	Bass, production, songwriting, synthesizer
"Elements of a New Life"	2021	VER:WEST	Production, songwriting
"Take My Chance"	2023	MK	Bass, drums, engineer, guitar, keyboards, production, songwriting, synthesizer
"Heat Rising"	2023	Pete Tong x Jem Cooke x Jules Buckley	Instruments, production, songwriting

== Music videos ==
Title	Year	Director(s)
"Shot Away" (as Pawn Shop)	2006	Mike Cockayne
"Breath Away" (as Whelan & Di Scala featuring Abigail Bailey)	2009	
"The Act"	2014	Nima Nabili Rad, Luke Eblen
"Paradigm" (featuring A*M*E)	2015	Tom Griffin
"Constellations”	2015	
"Paths" (with Redondo)	2016	
"Cola" (with Elderbrook)	2017	Millicent Hailes
"Panic Room" (with Au/Ra)	2018	Granz Herman
"Breathe" (with Christoph featuring Jem Cooke)	2019	GMUNK
"Be Someone" (with Jake Bugg)	2019	The Sacred Egg
"Rabbit Hole" (featuring Jem Cooke)	2020	Taz Tron Delix
