= 2019 UK Music Video Awards =

Edition of award ceremony

- Date: 23 October 2019
- Location: Roundhouse, London, United Kingdom
- Hosted by: Adam Buxton
- Website: www.ukmva.com

The 2019 UK Music Video Awards were held on 23 October 2019 to recognise the best in music videos from United Kingdom and worldwide. The nominations were announced on 25 September 2019. British singer FKA Twigs led the nominations with seven.

== Video of the Year ==
Video of the Year

Stormzy - "Vossi Bop"
(Director: Henry Scholfield)

== The Icon Award ==
The Icon Award

Michel Gondry

== Video Genre Categories ==
Best Pop Video - UK	Best Pop Video - International
Barns Courtney - "You and I" (Director: Pablo Maestres): Ed Sheeran & Chance the Rapper ft. PnB Rock - "Cross Me"; Ed Sheeran & Travis Scott - "Antisocial"; Labrinth - "Miracle"; Mark Ronson ft. Miley Cyrus - "Nothing Breaks Like a Heart"; The 1975 - "Sincerity Is Scary"	Rosalía - "De aquí no sales" (Directors: Diana kunst & Mau morgó): Billie Eilish - "when the party's over"; Madonna - "Dark Ballet"; Rosalía - "Aute Cuture"; Sigrid - "Sucker Punch"; Tove Lo - "Glad He's Gone"
Best Rock Video - UK	Best Rock Video - International
Sam Fender - "Dead Boys" (Director: Vincent Haycock): Bombay Bicycle Club - "Eat, sleep, wake"; Foals - "Exits"; Idles - "Mercedes Marxist"; Mumford & Sons - "Beloved"; The 1975 - "Love It If We Made It"	De Staat - "Kitty Kitty" (Director: Wouter Stoter): Beirut - "Landslide"; Brittany Howard - "Stay High"; Gary Clark Jr. - "This Land"; Rammstein - Deutschland; The Lumineers - "Gloria"
Best Alternative Video - UK	Best Alternative Video - International
FKA Twigs - "Cellophane" (Director: Andrew Thomas Huang): Four Tet - "Teenage Birdsong"; James Blake - "Can't Believe the Way We Flow"; James Massiah - "Natural Born Killers (ride for me)"; Novo Amor - "Repeat Until Death"; The Specials - "Vote for Me"	Cayucas - "Girl" (Director: Nick Roney): Jordan Klassen - "Virtuous Circle"; Kamasi Washington - "Hub-tones"; Karen O & Danger Mouse - "Woman"; Sam Tudor - "Joseph in the Bathroom"; Tshegue - "m'benga bila"
Best Dance Video - UK	Best Dance Video - International
Beardyman ft. Joe Rogan - "6am (ready to write)" (Director: Ian Pons Jewell): CamelPhat x Jake Bugg - "Be Someone"; Elderbrook x Rudimental - "Something About You"; Hot Chip - "Hungry Child"; Prospa - "Prayer"; The Chemical Brothers - "We've Got to Try"	Salvatore Ganacci - "Horse" (Director: Vedran Rupic): Apparat - "Heroist"; Carnage ft. Terror Bass - "Holy Moly"; Chaka Khan - "Hello Happiness"; Justice - "Love S.O.S."; Weval - "Someday"
Best Urban Video - UK	Best Urban Video - International
Stormzy - "Vossi Bop" (Director: Henry Scholfield): Dave - "Black"; Jorja Smith ft. Burna Boy - "Be Honest"; Loyle Carner ft. Jordan Rakei - "Ottolenghi"; Slowthai ft. Skepta - "Inglorious"; Wiley, Sean Paul, Stefflon Don ft. Idris Elba - "Boasty"	A$AP Rocky ft. Tame Impala - "Sundress" (Director: Frank Lebon): 21 Savage ft. J. Cole - "A Lot"; A$AP Rocky - "Kids Turned Out Fine"; Freddie Gibbs & Madlib - "Crime Pays"; Lil Nas X ft. Billy Ray Cyrus - "Old Town Road Remix"; Vince Staples - "Fun!"
Best Pop Video - Newcomer	Best Rock Video - Newcomer
Ashnikko - "Hi, it's Me" (Director: Lucrecia Taormina): Harrison ft. Ralph - "Your Girl"; KWAYE - "Paralyzed"; Shura - "Religion (u can lay your hands on me)"; Spencer Sutherland - "Sweater"; Yumi Zouma - "In Camera"	Flasher - "Material" (Director: Nick Roney): Beabadoobee - "Disappear"; Crows - "Wednesday's Child"; Fat White Family - "When I Have"; Indoor Pets - "Being Strange"; Lo! - "As Fools Ripen"
Best Alternative Video - Newcomer	Best Dance Video - Newcomer
Obongjayar - "Never Change" (Director: Duncan Loudon): Amon Tobin - "Vipers Follow You"; Pearl City - "Down by the Tree"; SOAK - "Everybody Loves You"; Sola - "Save Yourself"; Swim Deep - "To Feel Good"	Cora Novoa - "State of Mind" (Director: Alex Gargot): Daithi ft. The Sei - "In My Darkest Moments"; Daniel Avery - "Under the Tallest Arch"; Leifur James - "Wurlitzer"; RL Grime & Graves - "Arcus"; Sludge - "Blacksmith"
Best Urban Video - Newcomer
Jay Prince - "Beamlight" (Director: Filmawi): Col3trane - "2am Freestyle"; Flohio - "Wild Yout"; Ghetts ft. Kojey Radical - "Black Rose"; Lauren Declasse - "Evisu"; Ocean Wisdom - "4AM"

== Craft and Technical Categories ==
Best Production Design in a Video	Best Styling in a Video
Loyle Carner ft. Jordan Rakei - "Ottolenghi" (Production Designer: Luke Moran-Morris): Barns Courtney - "You and I"; Dizzee Rascal ft. Skepta - "Money Right"; Jorja Smith ft. Burna Boy - "Be Honest"; Lee Ann Womack - "Hollywood"; Thom Yorke - "Anima"	Baloji - "Zombies" (Stylist: Baloji): A$AP Rocky ft. FKA Twigs - "Fukk Sleep"; Kojey Radical - "25"; Little Dragon - "Lover Cheating"; Mark Ronson ft. Lykke Li - "Late Night Feelings"; Rosalía - "De aquí no sales"
Best Choreography in a Video	Best Cinematography in a Video
Thom Yorke - "Anima" (Choreographer: Damien Jalet): FKA Twigs - "Cellophane"; Heavy Baile ft. Goes - "Ciranda"; Jungle - "Casio"; Paloma Faith - "Loyal"; Yumi Zouma - "In Camera"	FKA Twigs - "Cellophane" (DOP: Daniel Fernández Abelló): A$AP Rocky ft. Tame Impala - "Sundress"; Agoria featuring Phoebe Killdeer - "Embrace"; Everyone You Know - "The Drive"; Kojey Radical - "25"; Stormzy - "Vossi Bop"
Best Color Grading in a Video	Best Editing in a Video
Prince - "Mary Don't You Weep" (Colourist: Simon Bourne at Framestore): Carnage ft. Terror Bass - "Holy Moly"; James Massiah - "Natural Born Killers (Ride for Me)"; Paloma Faith - "Loyal"; Peggy Gou - "Starry Night"; Youth - "Haunted"	FKA Twigs - "Cellophane" (Editor: Andrew Thomas Huang): CamelPhat x Jake Bugg - "Be Someone"; Estrons - "Body"; Ghetts ft. Kojey Radical - "Black Rose"; James Blake - "Can't Believe the Way We Flow"; The Chemical Brothers - "We've Got to Try"
Best Visual Effects in a Video	Best Animation in a Video
FKA Twigs - "Cellophane" (VFX: Analog Studio, Matt Chandler, Fabio Zaveti): Amon Tobin - "Vipers Follow You"; Beardyman ft. Joe Rogan - "6am (ready to write)"; The Chemical Brothers - "Free Yourself"; Tove Lo - "Glad He's Gone"; Vince Staples - "Fun!"	Weval - "Someday" (Animator: Páraic mc Gloughlin): John Grant - "He's Got His Mother's Hips"; Lee Ann Womack - "Hollywood"; Leifur James - "Wurlitzer"; Sivan Talmor - "Sad Heart"; The Specials - "Vote for Me"

== Live and Interactive Categories ==
Best Live Video	Best Live Concert
Maggie Rogers - "Light On" (La Blogotèque - Live in Paris) (Director: Elie Girard): Kano ft. D Double E & Ghetts - "Class of Deja"; Kojey Radical - "Can't Go Back" (MTV Originals); Mumford & Sons - "Delta"; Tom Walker - "Angels" (Vevo UK Lift); Wolf Alice - "Visions of a Life"	Kylie Minogue - Golden Live Tour (Director: Blue Leach & Rob Sinclair): Coldplay - Live in São Paulo; Justice - IRIS: A Space Opera; Paul Weller - May Love Travel with You
Best Special Video Project
Kano - "Trouble" (Director: Aneil Karia): Baco Exu do Blues - "Bluesman"; Cayucas - "Girl"; Kamasi Washington - "As Told to g/d Thyself"; Thom Yorke - "Anima"; Tove Lo - "Blue Lips"

== Individual and Company Categories ==
Best Artist	Best Commissioner
FKA Twigs: Dave; James Blake; Lizzo; Loyle Carner; Rosalía	Semera Khan: Connie Meade; Dan Curwin; John Moule; Laura Clayton; Sam Seager
Best Production Company	Best Producer
Object & Animal: Cavias; Compulsory; Division; Partizan; Pulse Films	Javier Alejandro: Dasha Deriagina; Dom Thomas; Hayley Williams; Morgan Clement; Rick Hayes
Best Director	Best New Director
Henry Scholfield: Dave Meyers; Diana Kunst & Mau Morgó; Frank Lebon; Ian Pons Jewell; Matilda Finn	Duncan Loudon: Charlottew Regan; Louis Bhose; Max Siedentopf; Rick Roney; The Rest
