= Why Do We Shake in the Cold? =

Studio album by Elderbrook
- Released: 18 September 2020
- Recorded: 2018–2020
- Length: 39:23
- Label: Parlophone
- Producers: Elderbrook; Jacob Manson; Nicky Night Time; Joel Pott; Jacknife Lee; Rudimental; Andrew Sheldrake; Commands; Mark Ralph; Dan Bartlett; Henrik Michelsen; Bobby Love; Totally Enormous Extinct Dinosaurs; Ytram

Elderbrook chronology
Old Friend EP (2018)	Why Do We Shake in the Cold? (2020)	Little Love (2023)

Singles from Why Do We Shake in the Cold?
- 1. "Something About You" Released: 9 August 2019; 2. "Numb" Released: 6 March 2020; 3. "My House" Released: 2 July 2020; 4. "Why Do We Shake in the Cold?" Released: 4 September 2020; 5. "Back to My Bed" Released: 18 September 2020

Why Do We Shake in the Cold? is the debut studio album by British electronic musician Elderbrook. It was released on 18 September 2020 through Parlophone Records. The album includes his most recent charted hit "Something About You" with Rudimental.

== Critical reception ==
Professional ratings
Review scores
Source	Rating
Clash	6/10
The Line of Best Fit	9/10

Malvika Padin of The Line of Best Fit felt that the "11-track production builds as the culmination of Elderbrook's life experiences and consistently ascending career graph", calling it "euphoric and sombre in equal parts" and a "companion on good days and bad" with "finely crafted music". Reviewing the album for Clash, Sidney Franklyn wrote that "The more we delve into Why Do We Shake..., the harder it becomes to justify Kotz's insistence in writing exclusively vocal-driven dance music. Lyrics range from the bland on 'I'm a Fool' and 'All My Love' [...] to the downright bizarre", going on to say that "it's towards the end of the record that Kotz's potential as a producer really begins to shine".

== Track listing ==
Why Do We Shake in the Cold? – Standard edition
No.	Title	Writer(s)	Producer(s)	Length
1.	"All My Love"	Alexander Kotz; Jacob Manson	Elderbrook; Manson	3:31
2.	"Numb"	Kotz; Nicholas Routledge	Elderbrook; Nicky Night Time; Manson^{[a]}	3:50
3.	"I'm a Fool"	Kotz; Manson; Joel Pott	Elderbrook; Manson; Pott	3:17
4.	"My House"	Kotz; Sophie Davis; Garret Lee	Elderbrook; Jacknife Lee	3:42
5.	"Something About You" (with Rudimental)	Kotz; Pott; Amir Izadkhah; Piers Aggett; Kesi Dryden; Leon Rolle; Andrew Sheldrake; Carla Marie Williams; Luke Fitton; Keir MacCulloch; Kyle Mackenzie	Elderbrook; Rudimental; Sheldrake; Commands^{[a]}; Mark Ralph^{[a]}	3:23
6.	"Down by the Bay"	Kotz; Manson	Elderbrook; Manson	3:29
7.	"Take a Minute"	Kotz; Daniel Bartlett	Elderbrook; Manson; Bartlett	3:29
8.	"Back to My Bed"	Kotz; Corey Sanders; Janee Bennett; Edvard Forre Erfjord; Henrik Barman Michelsen; Christopher Tempest	Elderbrook; Manson; Michelsen	3:22
9.	"Set Fire to My Gun"	Kotz; Dayton James; Robert Wauchope	Elderbrook; Manson; Bobby Love	3:59
10.	"Why Do We Shake in the Cold?"	Kotz; Orlando Higginbottom	Elderbrook; Manson; Totally Enormous Extinct Dinosaurs	5:13
11.	"Next December"	Kotz; Manson	Elderbrook; Manson	2:08
Total length:				39:23

Deluxe edition
No.	Title	Writer(s)	Producer(s)	Length
12.	"Cola" (with CamelPhat; live from the London Aquarium)	Kotz; David Whelan; Michael Di Scala	CamelPhat	3:44
13.	"Fire" (with Ytram)	Kotz; Martijn Garritsen	Ytram	2:43
14.	"Numb" (live from the London Aquarium)			2:27
15.	"Something About You" (with Rudimental; live from the London Aquarium)			4:05
Total length:				52:22

Notes

- ^{^[a]} signifies an additional producer

== Charts ==
Chart performance for Why Do We Shake in the Cold?
Chart (2020)	Peak position
UK Album Downloads (Official Charts)	27
UK Dance Albums (Official Charts)	2
