= Hit-Girl (disambiguation) =

Hit-Girl is a fictional character.

Hit-Girl, Hit Girl, or Hitgirl may also refer to:

- Hit-Girl (comic book), a comic with the above character as the main character
- "Hit Girl" (song), a 2007 single by Sébastien Léger
- Hit Girls, a 2013 Australian martial arts action comedy short film
- Hitgirl, a film with Sophie Alexander
- Hitgirl, a 2022 collaboration album with Dreezy and Hit-Boy

== See also ==
- "Hitgirl" for Selma; see Patric Ullaeus#Music Videos
- "Even Hitgirls Get the Blues"; see Garth Ennis bibliography
