= Something About You (Elderbrook and Rudimental song) =

Single by Elderbrook and Rudimental

from the album Why Do We Shake in the Cold?
- Released: 9 August 2019
- Length: 3:23
- Label: Parlophone; Warner Music
- Songwriter(s): Alexander Kotz; Joel Pott; Andrew Sheldrake; Amir Izadkhah; Piers Aggett; Kesi Dryden; Leon Rolle; Carla Marie Williams; Luke Fitton; Keir MacCulloch; Kyle Mackenzie
- Producer(s): Rudimental; Elderbrook; Andy Sheldrake; Mark Ralph (add.)

Elderbrook singles chronology
"How Do You" (2019)	"Something About You" (2019)	"Numb" (2020)

Rudimental singles chronology
"Mean That Much" (2019)	"Something About You" (2019)	"Krazy" (2020)

"Something About You" is a song by English musician, songwriter, producer Elderbrook and English drum and bass band Rudimental. The song was released as a digital download on 9 August 2019 as the third single from Rudimental's debut EP Distinction. The song peaked at number eighty-seven on the UK Singles Chart.

== Background ==
Talking about the collaboration with Rudimental, Elderbrook said, "I've always loved the music and energy that Rudimental put out. This song wouldn't have happened without them and has been amazing collaborating with them!" The band also said, "We have been big fans of Elderbrook's vocals and production over the past few years so it's amazing to finally come together on this track!"

== Music video ==
A music video to accompany the release of "Something About You" was first released onto YouTube on 9 August 2019. The video was directed by Luke Davies.

== Track listing ==
Digital download
No.	Title	Length
1.	"Something About You"	3:23

Digital download – Chill Mix
No.	Title	Length
1.	"Something About You" (Chill Mix)	2:46

Digital download – Mason Maynard Remix
No.	Title	Length
1.	"Something About You" (Mason Maynard Remix Edit)	3:25
2.	"Something About You" (Mason Maynard Remix)	6:06

== Charts ==
Chart performance of "Something About You"
Chart (2019)	Peak position
Belgium (Ultratip Bubbling Under Flanders)	28
Belgium (Ultratip Bubbling Under Wallonia)	21
Ireland (IRMA)	88
UK Singles (OCC)	87
US Hot Dance/Electronic Songs (Billboard)	35

== Certifications ==
Region	Certification	Certified units/sales
New Zealand (RMNZ)	Gold	15,000^{‡}
United Kingdom (BPI)	Silver	200,000^{‡}
^{‡} Sales+streaming figures based on certification alone.
