= Chemical (MK song) =

Single by MK

from the album In the Night Again
- Released: May 2021
- Genre: House
- Length: 2:42
- Label: Area 10; Big On Blue Entertainment
- Songwriters: Dave Whelan; Marc Kinchen; Mike Di Scala
- Producers: MK; CamelPhat

MK singles chronology
"Lies" (2021)	"Chemical" (2021)	"Teardrops" (2022)

"Chemical" is a house song by MK. The song was produced by MK and CamelPhat and features vocals from Kyle Miller. It was written by MK, Miller, Di Scala, and Whelan. The song was released in May 2021 on MK's own label Area10 and on Big On Blue Entertainment.

== Video and promotion ==
The video was released in June 2021 and was directed by Aube Perrie. It features an anthropomorphic dog named D. The following month, an online game called Chemical Chase was released, with gameplay similar to that of Flappy Bird. Remixes of the single are used for the in-game soundtrack.

== Remixes ==
Three official remixes have been released, by 220 Kid, LP Giobbi, and MK.
