= Panic Room (song) =

Single by Au/Ra

from the EP X Games
- Released: 9 February 2018
- Genre: Tech house
- Length: 3:57 (original version); 3:34 (CamelPhat version)
- Label: Loudmouth
- Songwriters: Andrew Frampton; Gabriel Budin-Smithers; Jamie Stenzel; Max Farrar
- Producers: Andrew Frampton; Max Farrar

Au/Ra singles chronology
"Outsiders" (2017)	"Panic Room" (2018)	"Emoji" (2018)

CamelPhat singles chronology
"Bugged Out" (2018)	"Panic Room" (2018)	"Dopamine Machine" (2018)

"Panic Room" is a song recorded by German singer-songwriter Au/Ra for her debut extended play, X Games (2018). It was released on 9 February 2018, as the lead single from the EP. The song has sold over a million copies in the United States and was certified Platinum by the Recording Industry Association of America (RIAA).

"Panic Room" was later remixed by English production duo CamelPhat and was released on 29 March 2018. The remix charted in multiple countries, including the United Kingdom, where it reached the top 40 and was certified Platinum a year later. It was later included on CamelPhat's debut studio album Dark Matter (2020).

== Background ==
Au/Ra wrote the song about experiencing anxiety.

=== Music video ===
The music video for the song featured a spaceship-like area. In this area, people are running away to containment chambers after finding a dead body to protect themselves. Originally, the singer follows the others, but reveals to the audience that she was the one who attacked. She enters a chamber and her eyes flash red. The video was released on 21 February 2018, on Au/Ra's YouTube channel.

== Track listings ==
Digital download and stream
No.	Title	Length
1.	"Panic Room"	3:57

Digital download and stream - acoustic version
No.	Title	Length
1.	"Panic Room" (acoustic)	4:17

Digital download and stream - CamelPhat version
No.	Title	Length
1.	"Panic Room"	3:34
2.	"Panic Room" (club mix)	7:05

Digital download (Beatport) - KDA remix
No.	Title	Length
1.	"Panic Room" (KDA "Stop Saying You Were at Trade When You Weren't" extended remix)	5:22

Digital download and stream - The Remixes
No.	Title	Length
1.	"Panic Room" (Jonas Rathsman remix)	7:40
2.	"Panic Room" (KDA "Stop Saying You Were at Trade When You Weren't" remix)	4:01
3.	"Panic Room" (Denis First & Reznikov remix)	3:03
4.	"Panic Room" (Sway Gray remix)	3:36
5.	"Panic Room" (eSQUIRE remix)	7:20

Digital download and stream - Culture Shock remix
No.	Title	Length
1.	"Panic Room" (Culture Shock remix)	4:46

== Charts ==
=== Weekly charts ===
Weekly chart performance for "Panic Room"
Chart (2018)	Peak position
Belgium (Ultratop 50 Flanders)	37
Belgium (Ultratip Bubbling Under Wallonia)	20
Belgium Dance (Ultratop Flanders)	2
Ireland (IRMA)	40
Netherlands Single Tip (MegaCharts)	18
Scotland Singles (OCC)	19
UK Singles (OCC)	30
UK Dance (OCC)	5
US Dance Club Songs (Billboard)	48
US Hot Dance/Electronic Songs (Billboard)	27

=== Year-end charts ===
Year-end chart performance for "Panic Room"
Chart (2018)	Position
US Hot Dance/Electronic Songs (Billboard)	67

== Certifications ==
Certifications for "Panic Room"
Region	Certification	Certified units/sales
New Zealand (RMNZ)	Platinum	30,000^{‡}
Poland (ZPAV)	Gold	25,000^{‡}
United Kingdom (BPI)	Platinum	600,000^{‡}
United States (RIAA)	Platinum	1,000,000^{‡}
^{‡} Sales+streaming figures based on certification alone.
