= Sébastien Léger =

French house DJ and producer (born 1979)

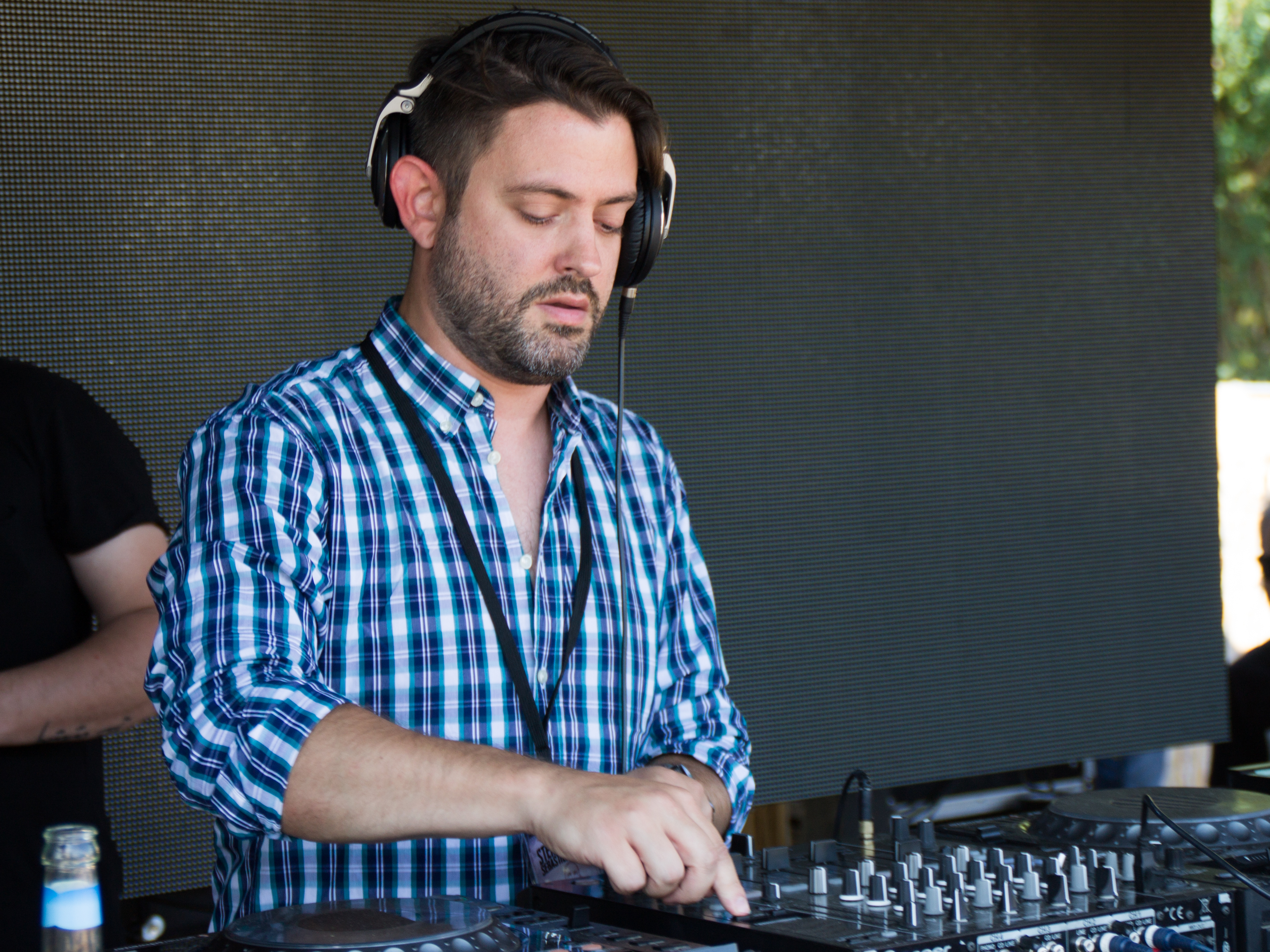
- Sébastien Léger in 2015

Background information
- Birth name: Sébastien Léger
- Also known as: Sébastien "Legend" Léger, Seb, Elesse, Sebago, The White Duck
- Born: 3 February 1979 (age 46)
- Origin: Paris, France
- Genres: Electronic, house
- Occupation(s): DJ, record producer
- Years active: 1995–present
- Labels: Mistakes Music, Lost Miracle
- Website: www.sebastienleger.net

Sébastien Léger (French pronunciation: [sebastjɛ̃ leʒe]) is a French DJ and house music producer. His singles "Hit Girl", "Hypnotized" and "Aqualight" have become hit dance singles played in clubs across Europe. In March 2021, Magnetic Magazine placed his track "Firefly" in the 15 Best House Tracks of February 2021.

== Discography ==
=== Albums, EPs and singles ===
Year	Title	Label
1999	Sébastien Léger – There Is Life After Us EP	Black Jack
1999	The White Duck – The Groove / The Million Dollar Track	Premium
2000	Sébastien Léger – Untitled (4 Tracks)	Subkroniq
2000	Sébastien Léger – Astrosyn Skunk / The Babe Coke	Cyclik
2000	Sébastien Léger – Atomic Pop LP	Black Jack
2000	Sébastien Léger – Hysterik Conspiration / Amnezik Impulsion	Cyclik
2000	Sébastien Léger – Midnight in Galaxy / Diametrik Acidness	Grand Prix
2000	Sébastien Léger – Off The Wall	Black Jack
2000	Sébastien Léger – We Are	Cyclik
2000	Sébastien Léger – You Can Hide From Your Beat	Black Jack
2001	Elesse – Pop Corn EP	Goodtime Records
2001	Elesse – P.Y.T.	Grand Prix
2001	Sébastien Léger – Untitled (3 Tracks)	Subkroniq
2001	Sébastien Léger – Burned Funk / Cracked Face	Subkroniq
2001	Sébastien Léger – Dazed and Confused EP	Black Jack
2001	Sébastien Léger – Express	Cyclik
2001	Sébastien Léger – Impossible à Cerner EP	Essence
2001	Sébastien Léger – Seems So Far	Black Jack
2001	Sébastien Léger – The Mushroom Project EP	Riviera
2001	Sébastien Léger – Thorny EP	Cube Recordings
2002	Elesse – Liberian Track	Grand Prix
2002	Sébastien Léger – King Size LP	Black Jack
2002	Sébastien Léger – The Mushroom Project 2 EP	Riviera
2002	Sébastien Léger – We Are EP	Black Jack
2002	Sébastien Léger – Victory EP	Black Jack
2002	The Last Blade – Requiem / Just Bask From Hell	Subkroniq
2003	Elesse: Rare & Unrelease Cutz	Black Jack
2003	Sébastien Léger – Azidobrazil / Listen	Ovum Recordings
2003	Sébastien Léger – First Beats EP	Bits Music
2004	Sebago – Hands on Me	Hot Banana
2004	Sébastien Léger – 5th Birthday	Black Jack
2004	Sébastien Léger – Grab My Hipps / My Slap	Black Jack

Year	Title	Label
2004	Sébastien Léger – LFO Swing EP	Aroma Jackin
2005	Sébastien Léger – 1979 EP	Intec Records
2005	Sébastien Léger – Epoxy	Black Jack
2005	Sébastien Léger – Lunar EP	Intec Records
2005	Sébastien Léger – Mooguno EP	Bits Music
2005	Sébastien Léger – Take Your Pills	Black Jack
2006	Sébastien Léger – Brouwersgracht EP	Circle Music
2006	Sébastien Léger – Bad Clock 04 EP	Intec Records
2006	Sébastien Léger – Cosmogold EP	Circle Music
2006	Sébastien Léger – Geft / T	Bits Music
2006	Sébastien Léger – Hit Girl	Black Jack
2006	Sébastien Léger – Hypnotized	Rising Music
2006	Sébastien Léger – Mistakes EP	Rising Music
2006	Sébastien Léger – The Bug EP	Pickadoll Records
2007	Sébastien Léger – Mercury / Mars	Mistakes Music
2007	Sébastien Léger – Aqualight	Mistakes Music
2007	Sébastien Léger – Pluton / Saturn	Mistakes Music
2007	Sébastien Léger – Planets LP	Mistakes Music
2008	Sébastien Léger – Jaguar	Mistakes Music
2008	Sébastien Léger – Word / Ghost	Rising Music
2008	Sébastien Léger – Majestic	Mistakes Music
2009	Sébastien Léger – Marina / Jungle	Mistakes Music
2009	Sébastien Léger – Seaweed / Sunset / Snapshot	Mistakes Music
2009	Sébastien Léger – Foxxy / Le Moustique	Mistakes Music
2009	Sébastien Léger – Bubbly / Discotechno	Mistakes Music
2009	Sébastien Léger – The Rhythm	Mistakes Music
2009	Sébastien Léger – Binola / The White Island	Mistakes Music
2010	Sébastien Léger – Plik Plok	SCI+TEC Digital Audio
2010	Sébastien Léger – Take Your Pills	Paradise Records
2010	Sébastien Léger – Balkamaniac / Les Frelons	Mistakes Music
2010	Sébastien Léger – Silicone Carne / Superdrums	Mistakes Music
2010	Sébastien Léger – Gone Wild / Mixtape	Mistakes Music
2011	Sébastien Léger – Origines	Mistakes Music
2011	Sébastien Léger – Polymod / Like Before	Mistakes Music
2012	Sébastien Léger – Packbo / Grey Sky & Yellow Coconuts	Mistakes Music
2012	Sébastien Léger – Wesh Wesh Wesh	Mistakes Music
2012	Sébastien Léger – Florida / C4N Y0U R34D 7H15	Mistakes Music
2016	Sébastien Léger – Jelly Bean	Systematic Recordings

=== Exclusive tracks ===
Year	Title	Compilation	Label
1999	Sébastien Léger – Rock It & Play	Blackjack Sampler 1	Black Jack
1999	Sébastien Léger – The Skyy Soul	Blackjack pres. Jackpot	Black Jack
2000	Sébastien Léger – The Hell of a Guy	Flamingo EP	Black Jack

Year	Title	Compilation	Label
2000	Sébastien Léger – Ice Cream	Cruel Summer	Riviera
2004	Sébastien Léger – Overdrived	Bassethound Sampler 1	Bassethound Rec.
2004	Sébastien Léger – Refresh Your Mind	Always Open	Sismic Music

=== Remixes ===
Year	Title	Label
1999	Fafa Monteco – Vous Voulez de la Musique	Sculpture
1999	Tony Esposito – Kalimba De Luna	DWBoys
1999	Da Bitchie Boyz – Le Zeeep	Black Jack
1999	Fafa Monteco – Good Time	Black Jack
2000	Paul Johnson – Noise	Acalwan
2000	Ron Carrol – The Sermon	Subliminal
2000	Fab G – Frenchy Frenzy	Grand Prix
2000	DJ Nekbath – Feel It	Grand Prix
2000	Chris Rubix – Brooklin Queen	Black Jack
2000	Phunky Data – Body Music	Sekence
2000	Fab G – Feelings	Grand Prix
2001	Eminence feat. Kathy Brown – Give It Up	Defected
2001	Nicholas – The Cruise	20000st
2001	Def Bond & Fafa Monteco – The Master	Chicayork
2001	Rok – Cycle Cuts	Cyber Production
2001	Jimmy Van De Velde – Beginnings	Subkroniq
2001	Dj Nekbath – Think Twice	Grand Prix
2002	Nicolas Vallée – Land of the Free	Mangusta
2002	Jaimy & Kenny D. – Keep on Touchin Me	Loaded Records
2002	Jakatta feat. Seal – My Vision	Ministry of Sound
2002	M – So Fly	Defected
2002	Etienne De Crecy – Three Day Week End	Disques Solid
2002	Liquid People vs. Simple Minds – Monster	Defected
2002	Alexander East – Tears	Grand Prix
2004	Fat Phaze – Take Care	Sismic Music
2004	Manuel Tur – Keep It Warm	Cyclik
2004	Dave Armstrong – Make Your Move	Eyezcream
2004	Sébastien Léger & Alexander Koning – Greencross	Mad Nurse

Year	Title	Label
2005	Highstreets – Don't Let Go	Ledge Music
2005	Co-Fusion – Hot! Hot! (Love To Heart)	Southern Fried Rec.
2005	Hiroki Esashika – Kazane	Intec Records
2005	DJ Marnix – Fire	Loveland Rec.
2005	Armand Van Helden – Into Your Eyes	Southern Fried Rec.
2005	Inner City – Say Something	Concept Records
2005	The Soul Monkey – Equator	Mangusta
2005	Invader – Desperate House	Bits Music
2005	Lifelike – Running Out	Work It Baby
2006	Dannii Minogue – Greatest Dancer	Central Station
2006	Bruno Banner – Spaceshift	Bits Music
2006	Giorgio Prezioso vs. Libex – Xperimetal Scratch	Pryda Friends
2006	Dave Robertson & Jon Gurd – The Rendition	CR2 Records
2006	Supermode – Tell Me Why	Superstar Rec.
2006	Claude Vonstroke – Deep Throat	Electrochoc
2006	Cirez D – Knockout	Mouseville
2006	Fairmont – Gazebo	Border Community
2006	Hystereo – Winters in the City / Executive Memo	Soma Quality Rec.
2006	Don Diablo – Blow	Sellout Sessions
2007	Julian Jeweil – Air Conditionné	Electrochoc
2007	Ida Engberg – Disco Volante	Pickadoll Records
2007	Justin Timberlake – What Goes Around	Zomba Records
2007	Ali Love – Secret Sunday Lover	I Love Records
2007	Stefy – Chelsea	Sony Music / BMG
2007	Chris Lake feat. Emma Hewitt – Carry Me Away	Rising Music
2007	Angel Alanis feat. Renée – Cage Me In	Asquared Music
2007	Eric Prydz vs. Floyd – Proper Education	Ministry of Sound
2007	Ida Engberg – Disco Volante	La Musique Fait La Force
2007	Kylie Minogue – In My Arms	Warner Music
2008	Deadmau5 – Slip	Ultra Records
2010	Cirez D – On/Off	Mouseville
2011	Gabriel Ananda – Hey Blop	Mistakes Music
2014	Daft Punk — Voyager	Daft Life
