= Dark Matter (CamelPhat album) =

Studio album by CamelPhat
- Released: 30 October 2020
- Recorded: 2017–2020
- Length: 89:48
- Label: Sony; CamelPhat
- Producer: CamelPhat; Cristoph; Artbat; Andrew Frampton; Max Farrar; Eli & Fur; Absofacto; Kosuke Kasza; Will Easton

Singles from Dark Matter
- 1. "Cola" Released: 16 June 2017; 2. "Panic Room" Released: 29 March 2018; 3. "Breathe" Released: 16 November 2018; 4. "Be Someone" Released: 4 June 2019; 5. "Rabbit Hole" Released: 8 November 2019; 6. "For a Feeling" Released: 24 April 2020; 7. "Hypercolour" Released: 26 June 2020

Dark Matter is the debut studio album by English DJ and production duo CamelPhat, released on 30 October 2020 through Sony Music Entertainment. The album features their hits "Cola", "Panic Room", "Breathe" and "Hypercolour", and includes guest appearances from the likes of Maverick Sabre, Ali Love and Noel Gallagher.

== Background ==
Upon the release of their song "Be Someone" in an interview with Annie Mac, CamelPhat revealed that they were working on their first full-length project, which they announced was under the title of Dark Matter.

In May 2020, the duo revealed on Twitter that the album was scheduled to be released sometime in September.

Prior to the release of "Hypercolour" in an interview with Forbes contributor Lisa Kocay, CamelPhat talked about the album, saying "“We have our long awaited album ready to drop very soon. We have worked tirelessly on it, and it's a reflection of us as producers from the club records, to the vocal tracks [and] to downtempo records. We can't wait for it to come out."

They officially announced the album on social media on 14 September 2020 with an expected pre-order date of 16 September. This was eventually withheld until 2 October 2020

== Singles ==
The album's lead single, "Cola", a collaboration with Elderbrook, was released on 16 June 2017. It eventually became the duo's first song to chart and get certified in numerous countries and peaked at number 18 in the Official UK Charts. The song charted in the United States later and was nominated for Best Dance Recording in the 2018 Grammy Awards, but lost to LCD Soundsystem's "Tonite".

The second single "Panic Room", a collaboration with Au/Ra, was released on 29 March 2018. The song is also classed as a CamelPhat remix of the originally released solo effort from Au/Ra the previous month and, due to popularity, the song was released as a collaboration, credited to both artists. Like its predecessor, it became a viral hit and peaked at number 30 in the UK.

The third single "Breathe", a collaboration with Cristoph and featuring vocals from Jem Cooke, was released on 16 November 2018. The song managed to peak at number 36 and get certified Gold in the UK alone. The song was primarily released and promoted through Cristoph's label Pryda Records, which is run by his mentor Eric Prydz. Prydz himself even published a remix of the song the following year.

The fourth single "Be Someone" a collaboration with Jake Bugg, was released on 4 June 2019. The song was first premiered by Annie Mac on BBC Radio 1 a couple days before, labelling the song as Annie Mac's Hottest Record of that week.

The fifth single "Rabbit Hole", featuring vocals from Jem Cooke, was released on 8 November 2019. This was later accompanied by a music video, directed by Taz Tron Felix, which was published on YouTube in January 2020. In the turn of the year, the song was already classed as a BBC Radio 1 a-list and, by that time, had garnered over 3 million streams on Spotify alone.

The sixth single "For a Feeling" a collaboration with Artbat and featuring vocals from Rhodes, was released on 24 April 2020. In addition, Ministry of Sound premiered the track on YouTube a week before its initial release. Even though released in 2020, the song was continuously getting praised and held in the highest regards in 2019 when it was featured as an unknown track within the sets of acts, such as Tale of Us.

The seventh single "Hypercolour", a collaboration with Yannis Philippakis, frontman of Foals, was released on 26 June 2020. An accompanying music video was released a couple months later in August 2020, directed by Max Vatble. The duo said about the song, "We've been long time fans of Foals after seeing them live a number of times over the years and they have always been on our list to collaborate with. Thankfully, the feeling was mutual."

== Track listing ==
Dark Matter track listing
No.	Title	Writer(s)	Producer(s)	Length
1.	"Blackbirds" (featuring Leo Stannard)	David Whelan; Michael Di Scala; Leo Stannard; Jamie Harper	CamelPhat	3:24
2.	"Be Someone" (with Jake Bugg)	Whelan; Di Scala; Jake Kennedy	CamelPhat	3:24
3.	"For a Feeling" (with Artbat featuring Rhodes)	Whelan; Di Scala; Artur Kryvenko; Vitalii Limarenko; David Rhodes	CamelPhat; Artbat	5:31
4.	"Inbetween the Lines"	Whelan; Di Scala	CamelPhat	3:24
5.	"Hypercolour" (with Yannis of Foals)	Whelan; Di Scala; Yannis Philippakis	CamelPhat	3:29
6.	"Spektrum" (featuring Ali Love)	Whelan; Di Scala; Alexander Williams	CamelPhat	5:19
7.	"Dance with My Ghost" (featuring Elderbrook)	Whelan; Di Scala; Alexander Kotz	CamelPhat	4:06
8.	"Easier" (featuring Lowes)	Whelan; Di Scala; Florence Welch; Justin Parker	CamelPhat	5:10
9.	"Panic Room" (with Au/Ra)	Whelan; Di Scala; Jamie Stenzel; Gabriel Benjamin; Andrew Frampton; Maxwell Farrar	CamelPhat; Frampton; Farrar	3:34
10.	"Keep Movin'" (with Skream featuring Max Milner)	Whelan; Di Scala; Oliver Jones; Maxwell Milner	CamelPhat; Skream	4:03
11.	"Wildfire" (featuring Lowes)	Whelan; Di Scala; Evie Plumb; Luke Paget; Jamie Walker	CamelPhat	3:30
12.	"Cola" (with Elderbrook)	Whelan; Di Scala; Kotz	CamelPhat	4:03
13.	"Phantoms" (with Cristoph)	Whelan; Di Scala; Christopher Costigan	CamelPhat; Cristoph	4:55
14.	"Rabbit Hole" (with Jem Cooke)	Whelan; Di Scala; Victoria Cooke	CamelPhat	3:09
15.	"Not Over Yet" (featuring Noel Gallagher)	Whelan; Di Scala; Noel Gallagher	CamelPhat	3:32
16.	"Waiting" (with Eli & Fur)	Whelan; Di Scala; Jonathan Visger; Kosuke Kasza; Eliza Dodd-Noble; Jennifer Milne-Skillman	CamelPhat; Eli & Fur; Absofacto^{[m]}; Kasza^{[m]}	5:31
17.	"Carry Me Away" (featuring Jem Cooke)	Whelan; Di Scala; Cooke	CamelPhat	5:12
18.	"Reaction" (with DEL-30 featuring Maverick Sabre)	Whelan; Di Scala; Gareth "DEL-30" Kitcher; Michael Stafford; Edward Thomas	CamelPhat	4:48
19.	"Witching Hour" (with Will Easton)	Whelan; Di Scala; William Easton	CamelPhat; Easton	4:18
20.	"Expect Nothing"	Whelan; Di Scala	CamelPhat	3:11
21.	"Breathe" (with Cristoph featuring Jem Cooke)	Whelan; Di Scala; Costigan; Cooke	CamelPhat; Cristoph	6:15
Total length:				89:48

== Charts ==
Chart performance for Dark Matter
Chart (2020)	Peak position
Irish Albums (OCC)	39
Scottish Albums (OCC)	38
UK Albums (OCC)	23

== Certifications ==
Certifications for Dark Matter
Region	Certification	Certified units/sales
United Kingdom (BPI)	Silver	60,000^{‡}
^{‡} Sales+streaming figures based on certification alone.
