= Breathe (CamelPhat and Cristoph song) =

2018 single by CamelPhat and Cristoph featuring Jem Cooke

Single by CamelPhat and Cristoph featuring Jem Cooke

from the album Dark Matter
- Released: 16 November 2018
- Genre: House
- Length: 7:13 (original mix); 3:14 (radio edit)
- Label: Pryda Presents
- Songwriters: Christopher Costigan; David Whelan; Jemma Victoria Cooke; Michael Di Scala
- Producers: CamelPhat; Cristoph

CamelPhat singles chronology
"Accelerator" (2018)	"Breathe" (2018)	"Kona" / "Liberation" (2019)

"Breathe" is a song by British production duo CamelPhat and English DJ Cristoph featuring English singer Jem Cooke. It was released on 16 November 2018 by Pryda Presents. It reached the top 40 on the UK Singles Chart and was certified Gold by the British Phonographic Industry (BPI). It also peaked at number 21 on the US Billboard Dance Club Songs chart.

== Background ==
Cristoph's mentor is Swedish DJ Eric Prydz, who released the song through his label Pryda Presents. In April 2019, Prydz released a remix of the track.

== Track listing ==
Digital download and stream
No.	Title	Length
1.	"Breathe"	3:14

Digital download (Beatport)
No.	Title	Length
1.	"Breathe" (original mix)	7:13

Digital download and stream - CamelPhat Just Chill mix
No.	Title	Length
1.	"Breathe" (CamelPhat Just Chill mix)	4:31

Digital download and stream - Eric Prydz remix
No.	Title	Length
1.	"Breathe" (Eric Prydz remix)	7:26

Digital download and stream - Christoph remix
No.	Title	Length
1.	"Breathe" (Christoph remix)	6:51

== Charts ==
=== Weekly charts ===
Weekly chart performance for "Breathe"
Chart (2018–2019)	Peak position
Belgium (Ultratop 50 Flanders)	47
Belgium (Ultratip Bubbling Under Wallonia)	7
Belgium Dance (Ultratop Flanders)	1
Euro Digital Song Sales (Billboard)	18
Hungary (Dance Top 40)	20
Hungary (Single Top 40)	32
Ireland (IRMA)	68
Mexico Airplay (Billboard)	27
New Zealand Hot Singles (RMNZ)	38
Scotland Singles (OCC)	18
UK Singles (OCC)	36
UK Dance (OCC)	10
US Dance Club Songs (Billboard)	21
US Hot Dance/Electronic Songs (Billboard)	35

=== Year-end charts ===
Year-end chart performance for "Breathe"
Chart (2019)	Position
Hungary (Dance Top 40)	57

== Certifications ==
Certifications for "Breathe"
Region	Certification	Certified units/sales
United Kingdom (BPI)	Platinum	600,000^{‡}
^{‡} Sales+streaming figures based on certification alone.
