= Au/Ra =

Antiguan singer and songwriter (born 2002)

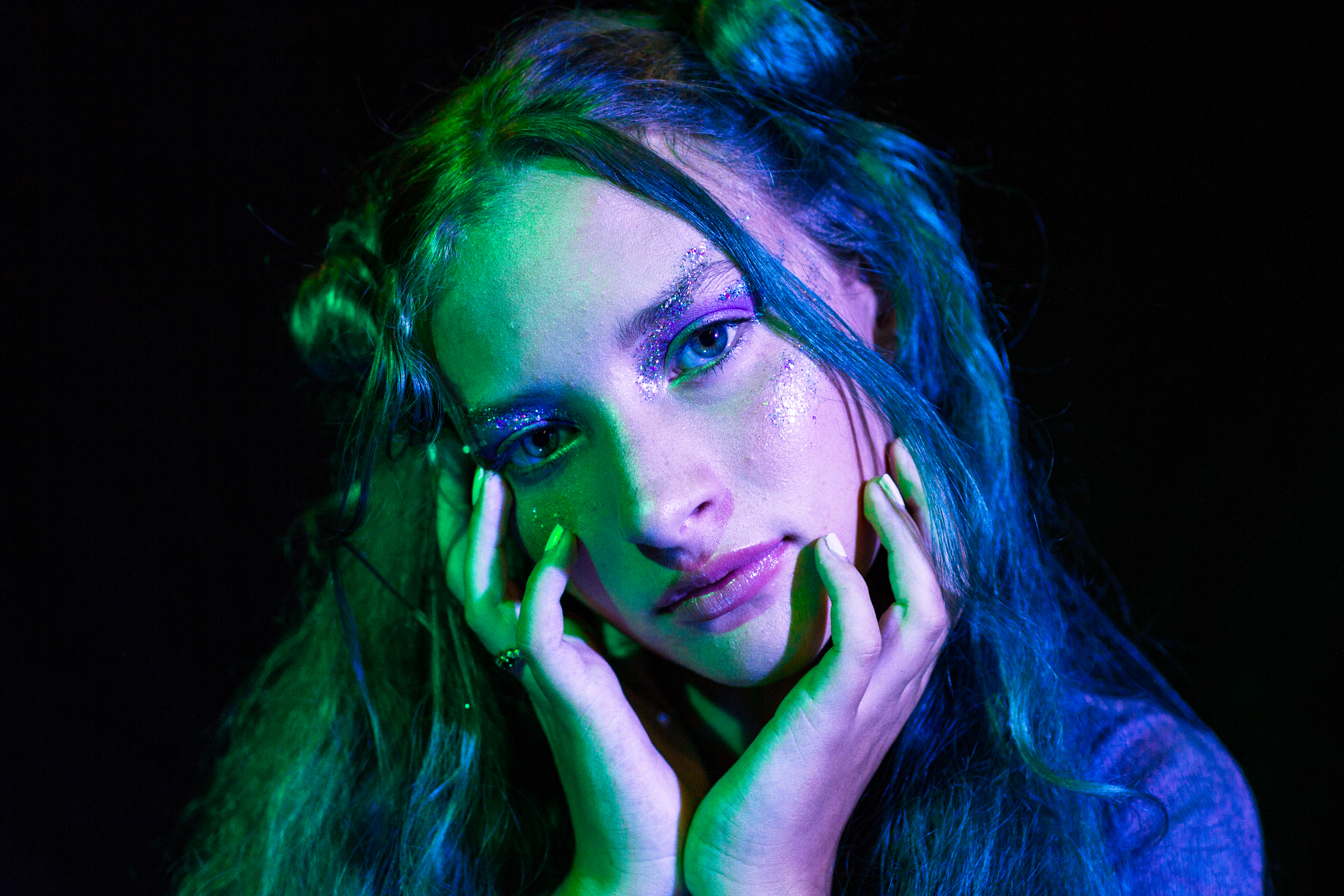

Background information
- Born: Jamie Lou Stenzel; 15 May 2002 (age 24)
- Origin: St. John's, Antigua and Barbuda
- Genres: Alternative pop; electropop; electronic
- Occupations: Singer; songwriter
- Labels: Sony; Columbia; Loudmouth; Polydor
- Website: heyitsaura.com

Jamie Lou Stenzel (born 15 May 2002), known professionally as Au/Ra, is a German-Antiguan singer and songwriter. She rose to prominence in 2018 following the release of "Panic Room", the lead single of her debut extended play, X Games.

She later collaborated with Alan Walker on the chart-topping single "Darkside" (2018). In 2020, she released "I Miss U" with English producer Jax Jones, and released her second EP, Soundtrack to an Existential Crisis the following year. Her debut studio album, Heartcore, released in June 2026.

== Early life ==
Jamie Lou Stenzel was born in Ibiza, Spain, where she grew up until 2007, but since then she was raised in St. John's, Antigua and Barbuda. She is the daughter of German producer Torsten Stenzel and the German Ibiza-based singer Angela Fuller (née Michelle Heldmann), also known professionally as Asheni. According to Spanish nationality law, since both of her parents are foreigners, she was not granted Spanish citizenship at birth. Jamie is considered German-Antiguan.

== Artistry ==
Au/Ra's stage name consists of two elements from the periodic table: "Au" stands for gold, while "Ra" stands for radium. Au/Ra said she decided to put a slash between 'Au' and 'Ra' to differentiate herself from a few singers already named Aura. She drew inspiration from The Lord of the Rings, and in her early adolescence she wrote her own fan fiction piece in which the main character, a sister of the elf prince Legolas, was called Aura.

== Discography ==
=== Studio albums ===
Title	Details
Heartcore	Released: 26 June 2026; Label: Polydor; Format: Digital download, Streaming, Vinyl, CD, Cassette

=== Extended plays ===
Title	Details
X Games	Released: 19 October 2018; Label: Loudmouth Music Limited; Format: Digital download, streaming
Soundtrack to an Existential Crisis	Released: 27 August 2021; Label: Loudmouth Music Limited; Format: Digital download, streaming
Night/Core	Released: 28 November 2025; Label: Polydor; Format: Digital download, streaming

=== Singles ===
==== As lead artist ====
Title	Year	Peak chart positions							Certifications	Album
Title	Year	AUS Club	UK	UK Dance	BEL (FL)	IRE	SCO	US Dance Club	Certifications	Album
"Concrete Jungle"	2016	—	—	—	—	—	—	—		Non-album singles
"Kicks"	2017	—	—	—	—	—	—	—		Non-album singles
"Outsiders"	2017	—	—	—	—	—	—	—		Non-album singles
"Panic Room" (Note: CamelPhat's version of "Panic Room" appears on their album Dark Matter.)	2018	1	30	5	37	41	21	48	BPI: Platinum; RIAA: Platinum; RMNZ: Platinum; ZPAV: Gold	X Games
"Emoji"	2018	—	—	—	—	—	—	—		X Games
"Assassin"	2019	—	—	—	—	—	—	—		Non-album singles
"Dance in the Dark"	2019	—	—	—	—	—	—	—		Non-album singles
"Medicine"	2019	—	—	—	—	—	—	—		Non-album singles
"Stay Happy"	2019	—	—	—	—	—	—	—		Non-album singles
"Ghost" (with Alan Walker)	2019	—	—	—	—	—	—	—		Death Stranding: Timefall
"Broken" (with OTR)	2020	—	—	—	—	—	—	—		Lost At Midnight
"Ideas"	2020	—	—	—	—	—	—	—		Non-album singles
"I Miss U" (with Jax Jones)	2020	64	25	—	—	32	—	—	ARIA: Platinum; BPI: Silver; ZPAV: Gold	Non-album singles
"Moon River"	2020	—	—	—	—	—	—	—		Non-album singles
"Dead Girl! (Shake My Head)" (Note: "Dead Girl!" was later re-named to "Dead Girl! (Shake My Head)" weeks after the song's release on streaming platforms.)	2021	—	—	—	—	—	—	—		Soundtrack to an Existential Crisis
"Bite Marks"	2021	—	—	—	—	—	—	—		Soundtrack to an Existential Crisis
"Screw Feelings"	2021	—	—	—	—	—	—	—		Soundtrack to an Existential Crisis
"Golden Hour" (with York)	2021	—	—	—	—	—	—	—		Non-album singles
"frozen halos"	2021	—	—	—	—	—	—	—		Non-album singles
"Plz Don't Waste My Youth"	2022	—	—	—	—	—	—	—		Non-album singles
"BLAH"	2025	—	—	—	—	—	—	—		Non-album singles
"Crack!"	2025	—	—	—	—	—	—	—		Heartcore
"High Fantasy"	2025	—	—	—	—	—	—	—		Heartcore
"SWAMP"	2025	—	—	—	—	—	—	—		Heartcore
"Mad World"	2026	—	—	—	—	—	—	—		Non-album single
"Killswitch"	2026	—	—	—	—	—	—	—		Heartcore
"—" denotes a recording that did not chart or was not released.

==== As featured artist ====
Title	Year	Peak chart positions				Certifications	Album
Title	Year	NOR	GER	IRE	SWE	Certifications	Album
"Darkside" (Alan Walker featuring Au/Ra and Tomine Harket)	2018	1	97	86	11	BPI: Silver	Different World
"Drown" (Ekali featuring Au/Ra)	2020	—	—	—	—		A World Away
"Feel Again" (Kina featuring Au/Ra)	2020	—	—	—	—		Things I Wanted to Tell You
"Side Effect" (Alok featuring Au/Ra)	2022	—	—	—	—		Deeper
"Nice To Meet Me" (Rxseboy featuring Au/Ra)	2022	—	—	—	—		Non-album singles
"Last Cigarette" (Mothica featuring Au/Ra)	2022	—	—	—	—		Non-album singles
"Worlds On Fire" (Afrojack and R3HAB featuring Au/Ra)	2022	—	—	—	—		Non-album singles
"Somebody Like U" (Alan Walker featuring Au/Ra)	2022	—	—	—	—		Walkerverse, Pt. I
"Highs & Lows" (ATB featuring Au/Ra and York)	2023	—	—	—	—		Non-album singles
"Glow" (San Holo featuring Au/Ra)	2024	—	—	—	—		Non-album singles
"Moonbeans" (Alissic featuring Au/Ra)	2025	—	—	—	—		ARC 01:MAIDEN
"Am I Enough (Tony Tony Chopper)" (Sonya Belousova & Giona Ostinelli featuring Au/Ra)	2026	—	—	—	—		One Piece: Into the Grand Line
"—" denotes a recording that did not chart or was not released.

==== Guest appearances ====
Title	Year	Other artist(s)	Album
"Wish It Was Me"	2021	Cheat Codes featuring Au/Ra	Hellraisers, Pt. 1
"Evergreen"	2023	Gryffin	Alive

== Awards and nominations ==
=== Results ===
Year	Awards	Category	Work	Result	Ref.
2020	Music Moves Europe Talent Awards	Pop-Act	Herself	Nominated	
2024	Electronic Dance Music Awards	Vocalist Of The Year	Herself	Nominated	

== Tours ==
=== Supporting ===
- Katy Perry - The Lifetimes Tour (2025)
