= Sincerity Is Scary =

Single by the 1975

from the album A Brief Inquiry into Online Relationships
- Released: 13 September 2018
- Genre: Neo soul; R&B; neo jazz
- Length: 3:45
- Label: Dirty Hit; Polydor
- Songwriters: Matthew Healy; George Daniel; Adam Hann; Ross MacDonald
- Producers: Matthew Healy; George Daniel

The 1975 singles chronology
"TooTimeTooTimeTooTime" (2018)	"Sincerity Is Scary" (2018)	"It's Not Living (If It's Not with You)" (2018)

Music video
- "Sincerity Is Scary" on YouTube

"Sincerity Is Scary" is a song by the English band the 1975 from their third studio album, A Brief Inquiry into Online Relationships (2018). The song was written by band members Matty Healy, George Daniel, Adam Hann and Ross MacDonald, while Daniel and Healy handled the song's production. It was released on 13 September 2018 by Dirty Hit and Polydor Records as the fourth single from the album. Contributions are featured from Roy Hargrove, who performs the trumpet, and the London Community Gospel Choir, who provide the choir vocals. Healy was inspired to write the song to confront his fear of sincerity, using postmodernism in the lyrics to denounce sardonicism and irony, choosing to portray vulnerability and honesty instead.

An experimental neo soul, R&B and neo jazz ballad, "Sincerity Is Scary" is built upon a hip hop beat. The song contains a hip hop production that incorporates layers of brass, trumpets, horns, saxophones, lounge piano riffs and a steady drum beat. It also draws from jazz, funk, indie pop, soul and lounge jazz. Thematically, the song highlights the problems of modern communication and critiques society for being generally cold and emotionless. Lyrically, Healy laments his partner for not being honest with herself and leading to a breakdown of their relationship.

"Sincerity Is Scary" received generally positive reviews from contemporary music critics, who mostly praised the production, lyrics and thematic depth. Reviewers compared the song to A Tribe Called Quest, Gang Starr, the Soulquarians and Musiq Soulchild. It peaked at number 57 on the UK Singles Chart, number 84 in Scotland, number 66 in Ireland and number 20 on the US Billboard Hot Rock & Alternative Songs chart. The song was later certified silver in the United Kingdom by the British Phonographic Industry (BPI). An accompanying music video, directed by Warren Fu, was released on 21 November 2018. Inspired by classic musical films, the visual features numerous references and Easter eggs related to the 1975's previous works. The video received positive reviews from contemporary critics, who praised the storyline, choreography and atmosphere, while it later appeared on several year-end lists.

== Background and development ==
"Irony is okay. Like, it's fine [...] It's harder to be really sincere. It's harder to be soft and vulnerable in the face of earnestness, serious shit… It's easier to be ironic in the face of those situations. It's easier to take the piss out of it. Or like be really sardonic. It's just something that I really, really noticed. And I kind of wanted to denounce."

— Healy, on denouncing irony in "Sincerity Is Scary".

In an interview with Genius, Healy revealed that the process of creating "Sincerity Is Scary" was not calculated. The singer relied on his instincts, having learned that the 1975's best music was created by trusting themselves. He sought to denounce sardonicism and insincerity in the song's lyrics, saying it is easier for people to remain ironic and defensive in the face of adversity. Speaking to Zane Lowe of Apple Music's Beats 1 Radio, Healy revealed that the song is meant to denounce his postmodern fear of being authentic. He believed there was a widespread tendency among people to hide behind irony and shield themselves from judgment. Elaborating further on his use of postmodernism within "Sincerity Is Scary", the singer used self-awareness when developing the lyrics, recognizing certain defence mechanisms of his and correcting them by being "just a bit more open and a bit easier, and genuinely sincere".

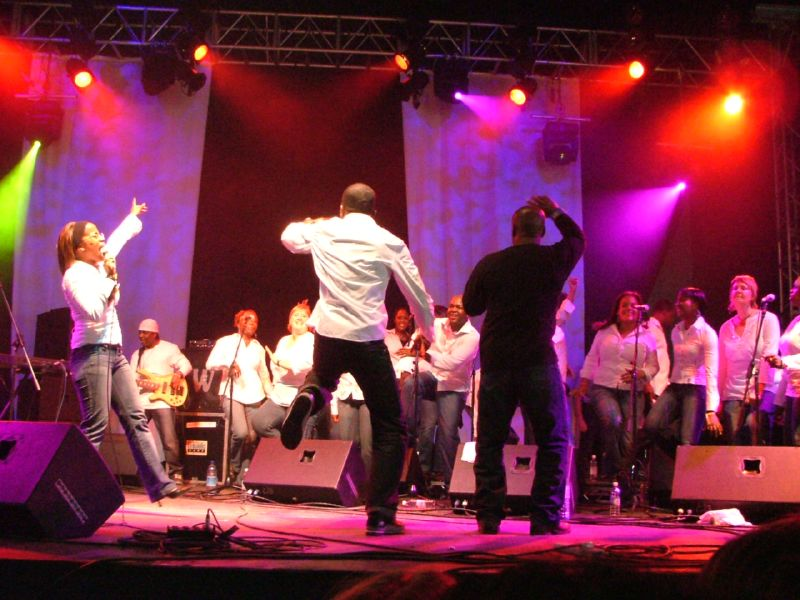
The London Community Gospel Choir contributes vocals to "Sincerity Is Scary".

The 1975 collaborated with the London Community Gospel Choir on "Sincerity Is Scary", with them providing the choir vocals. After having previously worked with them on I Like It When You Sleep, for You Are So Beautiful yet So Unaware of It, Healy lauded the choir as "amazing" and wanted them on A Brief Inquiry into Online Relationships, saying: "It wouldn't really be a 1975 record without them on it." The London Community Gospel Choir recorded their vocals at Abbey Road's Studio Three, which were engineered by Chris Bolster with assistance from Daniel Hayden. Roy Hargrove, who collaborated with the band on their previous album, performs the trumpet on "Sincerity Is Scary". According to Healy, they were highly impressed by Hargrove's playing on D'Angelo's Voodoo (2000), calling his work "iconic". The singer felt intimidated by the instrumentalist, calling the experience: "So intense. You'd get him in the room and you'd be so scared." Hargrove died two months after the song's release, an event that Healy called "heartbreaking", noting the instrumentalist was the first non-band contributor to feature on one of the 1975's albums. The singer took to Twitter and encouraged the band's fanbase to listen to "If I Believe You" (2016) and "Sincerity Is Scary" in remembrance of Hargrove, who Healy assured "made those songs so special for us".

== Music and lyrics ==
"Sincerity Is Scary"
A 24-second sample of "Sincerity Is Scary" showcasing the song's steady drum beat, smooth saxophones, scattered trumpets, loungey piano and Healy's vocals backed by a gospel choir.

Musically, "Sincerity Is Scary" is an experimental neo soul, R&B and neo jazz ballad built upon a hip hop beat. The song also contains elements of jazz, funk, indie pop, soul and lounge jazz. It has a length of three minutes and 45 seconds (3:45). According to sheet music published at Musicnotes.com by Hal Leonard Music Publishing, "Sincerity Is Scary" is set in the time signature of common time with a slow tempo of 90 beats per minute. The track is composed in the key of A major, with Healy's vocals ranging between the notes of F♯_{3} and F♯_{4}. It follows a chord progression of Dmaj–E♯dim–F♯m–G9. The song's hip hop production contains gentle sounds, gospel choirs, billowing trumpet lines, dragging beats, delicate guitar chords, soothing keyboard arrangements, piano riffs, a steady drum beat, synths and smooth layers of brass. It features waves of instrumentation composed of slow drums, smooth saxophones, intentionally scattered trumpets, horns and a loungey piano. "Sincerity Is Scary" features contributions from Hargrove, who performs the trumpet, and the London Community Gospel Choir, who provide the choir vocals.

Thematically, "Sincerity Is Scary" deals with modern communication problems, allowing oneself to be vulnerable, Healy's limitations as a songwriter and his struggle with heroin. Lyrically, "Sincerity Is Scary" critiques society at large for being cold and emotionless. As the song begins, Healy highlights the irony of insincerity and accuses people of hiding behind their feelings. In the chorus, he describes being in a relationship with a woman who is not honest with herself, inhibiting a closer emotional bond between the pair. However, trying to address this problem puts a strain on their relationship: "Why can't we be friends, when we are lovers? / 'Cause it always ends with us hating each other". Later, Healy addresses social media surveillance, self-knowledge and a communication breakdown ("And why would you believe you could control how you're perceived / When at your best, you're intermediately versed in your own feelings?") and derides her inability to mature and start a family ("Keep on putting off conceiving / It's only you that you're deceiving / Oh, don't have a child, don't cramp your style").

Rhian Daly of NME observed the premise of "Sincerity Is Scary" to be Healy's dismantling of his ironic defences. He considered the lyrics "You lack substance when you say / Something like, 'Oh, what a shame'" to be self-referential, noting the later phrase is used multiple times throughout I Like It When You Sleep, for You Are So Beautiful yet So Unaware of It. Jarrod Johnson II of Paste felt the song addresses the mental hurdles of reduced transparency and honesty in modern-day relationships, both socially and romantically. Maura Johnston of Rolling Stone interpreted religious undertones, calling it "a shuffling rumination on the gaps between people that underscores Healy's hoped-for leap into faith". Matt Collar of AllMusic compared the track to the work of D'Angelo. Marissa Lorusso of NPR noted that the chorus of voices in the refrain are evocative of the "more touching" numbers on the 1975's second studio album, while Joe Goggins of Drowned in Sound said the inclusion of Hargrove is more specifically reminiscent of the band's "If I Believe You". Echoing Goggins' statements, Caitlin Ison of Atwood Magazine said both songs share sonic similarities owing to the use of gospel choirs in their choruses.

== Release and reception ==
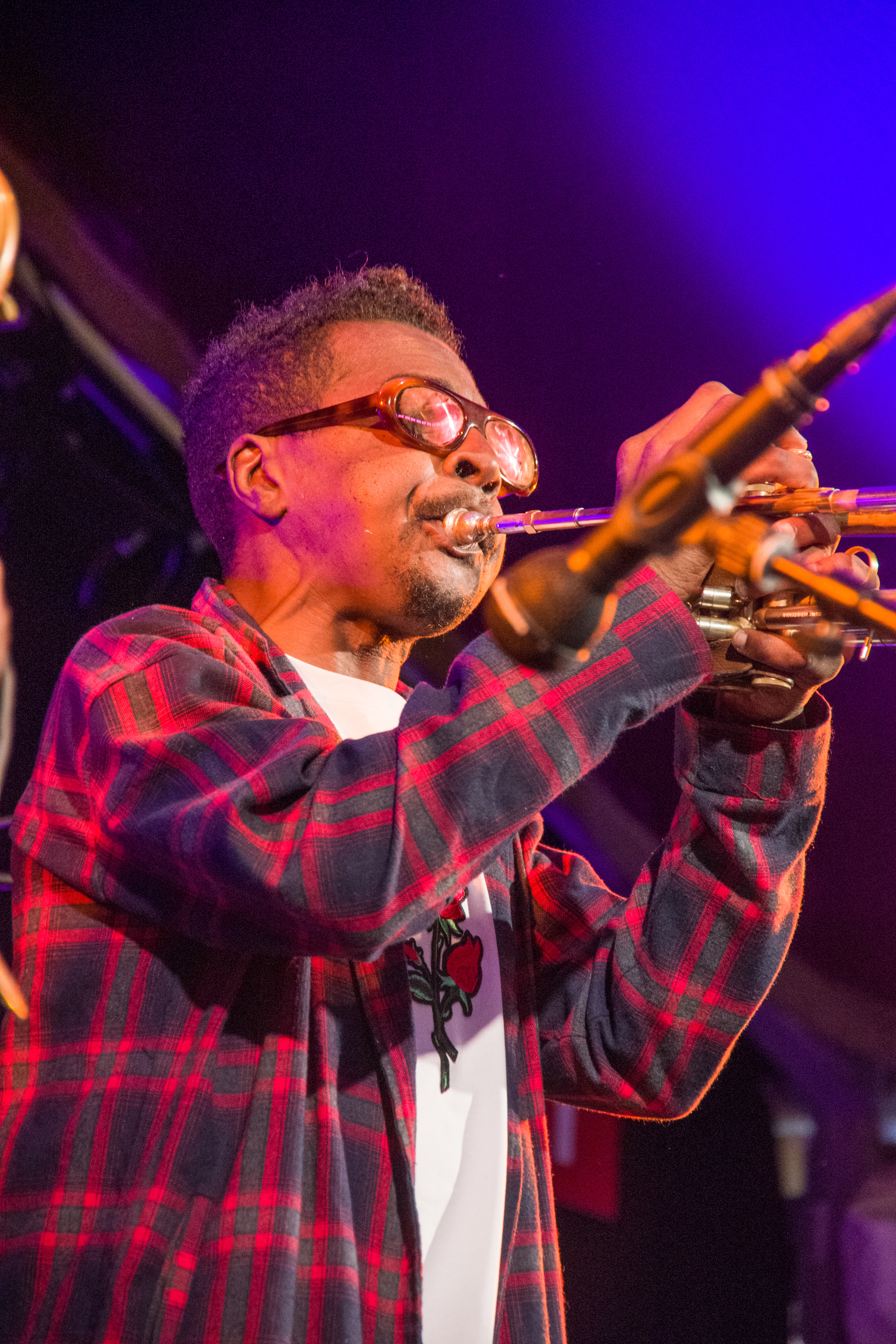
Several critics praised the inclusion of Roy Hargrove.

"Sincerity Is Scary" was released as a single on 13 September 2018; the song was met with generally positive reviews from contemporary music critics. Chris DeVille of Stereogum deemed "Sincerity Is Scary" the 15th-best pop song of 2018, while Frazier Tharpe of Complex declared it the fifth-best song of the year.

Johnston deemed the song a highlight from A Brief Inquiry into Online Relationships. Robin Murray of Clash praised the 1975's incorporation of jazz in "Sincerity Is Scary" and noted influences of A Tribe Called Quest and Gang Starr that are "filtered through a 1975 lens". Goggins commended Hargrove's contribution. Danny Chau of The Ringer said the song was one of the most surprising stylistic choices on the album, praising Hargrove's contribution and comparing the composition to the Soulquarians and Musiq Soulchild. Shannon Cotton of Gigwise called the song smooth and sultry, saying it "makes you feel like you should be sat on the rooftop of a New York apartment, with a cigarette in one hand and an expensive glass of red wine in the other, gazing at the skyline". Ross Horton of musicOMH praised the fun and "sexy" sound of "Sincerity Is Scary" and the London Community Gospel Choir's inclusion, saying he could image listeners repeatedly listening to it.

Daly praised the stark yet warm composition and lyrical depth, saying: "[Healy's] attempts at [sincerity] are still as beautiful and thought-provoking as his lyrics at the other end of the spectrum. This time, he just feels a lot more human." Marina Pedrosa of Billboard highlighted the contrast of the song's emotionally-charged lyrics against the uplifting sonics and graceful melody. Lorusso declared it the most exciting single from A Brief Inquiry into Online Relationship, praising Healy for providing an earnestness that "positions him as a try-hard worth rooting for". Brittany Spanos of Rolling Stone said "Sincerity Is Scary" serves as a "reminder that sincerity is worth flexing every once in a while", commenting that its subject matter matches the band's sonic dichotomy. She observed the underlying message to be a confrontation with society's desire to hide insecurities by presenting a brighter facade. Isabella Castro-Cota of Spin commented that the song's lyrics are performed through "a more honest lens". Ison commended the 1975 for exploring a larger, more serious topic, while remaining approachable through a fun and feel-good sound. Althea Legaspi of Rolling Stone highlighted the earnest sentimentality of the lyrics and the warm chorus of voices on the hook. Gil Green of Stereogum praised Healy for "working towards some innovative angle that never quite means what you think".

In a mixed review of "Sincerity Is Scary", Claire Biddles of The Line of Best Fit deemed it one of the few missteps on A Brief Inquiry into Online Relationship. While she praised the laid-back music style, Biddles found the lyrics "painfully close to the faux-authenticity of a charity single". Similarly, Libby Cudmore of Paste called the song a "stupefying mess" and the album's accidental thesis. While she praised the composition and songwriting, Cudmore felt the 1975 were attempting to incorporate too many genres at once. In a negative review, Roisin O'Connor of The Independent compared "Sincerity Is Scary" to a throwaway Ed Sheeran song, calling it a "sickly ballad that frontman Matty Healy claimed was about dismantling his ironic shield, but if anything this sounds as false and insincere as anything else they've released before". Commercially, "Sincerity Is Scary" performed modestly on international music charts. In the 1975's native United Kingdom, the song peaked at number 57 on the UK Singles Chart and number 84 in Scotland. Internationally, it reached number 66 in Ireland and number 20 on the US Billboard Hot Rock & Alternative Songs chart. "Sincerity Is Scary" was later certified silver in the United Kingdom by the British Phonographic Industry (BPI), denoting sales of over 200,000 units.

== Music video ==
=== Development and release ===
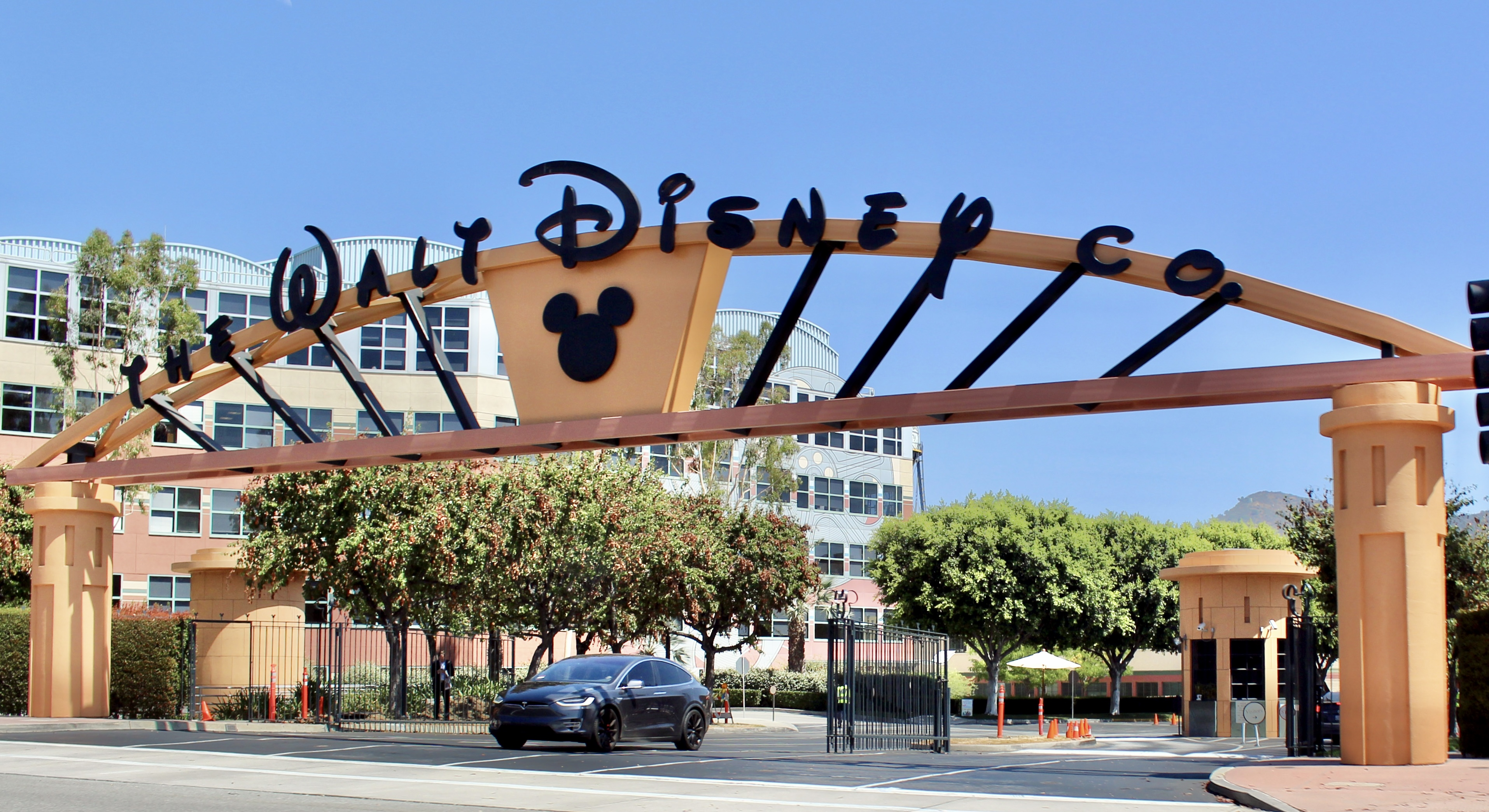
The music video for "Sincerity Is Scary" was filmed on a set at Walt Disney Studios in Los Angeles, California.

To create the music video for "Sincerity Is Scary", the 1975 worked alongside director Warren Fu. It was filmed on a fake American street located on a set at Walt Disney Studios in Los Angeles, California. The video was inspired by classic musical films such as Singin' in the Rain (1952) and My Sister Eileen (1955). Healy was also influenced by more recent musicals, specifically La La Land (2016), saying: "I grew up wanting to be a dancer [...] I was obsessed with Michael Jackson." Building upon a Hollywood musical theme, Healy and Fu spent several months brainstorming ideas before filming. They sought to incorporate a supporting cast of chorus girls, dancers and marching bands. Speaking on his experience working with Healy, Fu said: "When it comes to music videos, it never ceases to amaze me when sketches on a whim materialise in person a few days later on set. There's no better feeling."

Much of the video was shot using a whip pan technique to create an "endless" flow, while Healy invented other production techniques himself, such as using a treadmill to create an optical illusion that he is continuously walking on the same spot. Overall, the singer called the video his proudest visual, describing it as a "good bowl of soup levels wholesome". On 26 October 2018, Healy teased the video on Twitter, posting a photo of the band from an NME photoshoot alongside a caption reading: "Sincerity Is Scary Video". On both the occasions, the singer wore a rabbit hat that Shahlin Graves of Coup de Main compared to the 2009 film Where the Wild Things Are. The video was later released on 21 November. Upon release, Healy challenged the 1975's fanbase to find all the Easter eggs hidden in the visual. The rabbit hat worn by the singer was later made available for purchase on the band's official website, labelled as the "Sincerity Hat".

=== Synopsis ===
The video begins with Healy waking up in his all-white bedroom. A framed photo is shown on the wall, captured from an avant-garde art performance by Joseph Beuys entitled I Like America and America Likes Me, a nod to the band's song of the same name. As he sits up, a clock is shown with four hands, pointed at numbers one, nine, seven and five–spelling out the 1975's name; this is why an extra hand was added. The singer puts on the rabbit hat and a pair of headphones before exiting the house–shown to be located at street number 1975–in a 1990s inspired outfit. While initially shown to be drowsy, Healy's demeanour changes to joyful, and he skips down the stairs toward the street wearing a backpack. Upon reaching the bottom of the stairs, Healy begins to sing the song on the bright, busy and colourful street, greeting strangers and sharing kindness as he performs retro choreography. No Rome makes a cameo in the scene, greeting the singer while wearing a spacesuit and walking his Dalmatian. Continuing his walk down the street, Healy encounters a man wearing a paper bag over his head that reads "A Brief Inquiry into Online Relationships". The man also holds a newspaper with the headline "Modernity has failed us", a lyric from "Love It If We Made It". The singer steals flowers and grabs one to give to an older woman watering her plants.

Healy performs the chorus with a choir of women in pantsuits, an Easter egg meant to represent the women in the United States Congress.

Healy continues walking the street before falling into a hole in the ground, immediately emerging from a nearby building. He engages in a dance-off with a well-dressed man in the street, reminiscent of the video for the band's "A Change of Heart" (2016), and the pair swap outfits out of frame. The singer performs a dance sequence evocative of Jackson and gives his hat to a child before dashing to a lamppost, swinging around it in reference to Gene Kelly. As the camera pans, Healy emerges from a different house and is greeted by a choir of women on the steps. The women, dressed in pantsuits, are meant to represent women in the United States Congress. After performing the chorus with them on the road, the singer performs a football trick and plays a game of hopscotch with one of the children. In a cartoonish fashion, he then rushes to save MacDonald from a falling piano that crashes onto the sidewalk as the chorus starts.

The camera pans again to show Healy in front of a theatre as the sky fades into a sunset, changing the visual to a rosy hue. The signage outside the theatre reads "La poesie est dans la rue", meaning "the poetry is in the streets", a reoccurring motif that appears in several of the 1975's works, including the videos for "Love It If We Made It" and "Robbers" (2014). Healy performs the final chorus and bridge and is joined by the choir of women and a marching band. A little girl, dressed in mime makeup and holding an umbrella, stands with Healy out front of the theatre. Her attire is a nod to the 1975's video for "A Change of Heart", where the singer dons a similar appearance and plays a mime. While she is initially shown in black and white, Healy climbs up a ladder and pours water on her using a watering can, with the girl's appearance being restored to full colour. As the video concludes, the camera pans off into a pink sky.

=== Reception and controversy ===
Upon release, the "Sincerity Is Scary" music video was well-received by contemporary critics. Tom Breihan of Stereogum gave the video a positive review, saying it "fucking rules". He compared the visual to the 2010 film Step Up 3, saying: "Healy goes into a series of full-on charming and ridiculous old-timey movie-musical dance routines." Ryan Reed of Rolling Stone declared it a "joyously surreal" sidewalk musical. The Dork editorial staff compared the visual to a mix between the white rabbit from Alice in Wonderland (1951) and Fred Astaire, praising Healy's dancing, "winningly likeable smile and [the] spring in his step". Shea Lenniger of Billboard commended the visual, calling it charming, while Graves deemed the music video a "must-watch" and called it heartwarming. Melissa LaGrotta of Soundigest echoed Graves' second comment, saying the video is heartwarming. Daly gave the video a very positive review, saying: "Much like the song it accompanies, [the video will] make you feel a different kind of way than you'd typically expect The 1975 to make you feel – warm, fuzzy, and overflowing with positivity." Philip Cosores of Uproxx deemed it a "joyful dance party on the city streets". Patrick Campbell of Don't Bore Us called the visual "incredibly fun" and praised the less-serious tone in comparison to the previous videos released from A Brief Inquiry into Online Relationships. Maggie Serota of Spin wrote: "['Sincerity Is Scary'] has everything, up to and including choreography, sick soccer moves, a child in corpse paint, and what appears to be one long tracking shot."

Rosie Byers of Wonderland declared the visual one of the seven best music videos of 2018, calling it "unapologetically wholesome". Breihan ranked "Sincerity Is Scary" as the 16th-best music video of 2018, describing it as a "gloriously sunny, weirdly endearing pop-music hallucination". Hannah Mylrea of NME included the video on her year-end music videos list, commending the visual beauty, Easter eggs and dance routines, while calling it "gorgeous". Billboard declared "Sincerity Is Scary" the 15th-best video of 2018, with C.S. praising the 1975's successful execution of the musical-inspired concept, self-awareness and memorability, commenting it is "very fun". Daniel Welsh of HuffPost ranked the visual at number 18 on his year-end music videos list, writing it is: "At once both completely pretentious and utterly silly, which is actually a perfect description of the band themselves." Grant Sharples of Alternative Press included "Sincerity Is Scary" on his list of 10 music videos from the 1975 that should be made into feature-length films. Describing the visual, Sharples said it "is so charming and charismatic that it virtually begs the listener to smile and sing along".

On 16 January 2020, Lauv released his music video for "Tattoos Together". The 1975's fanbase quickly drew similarities between the two videos, noting both visuals featured the singers dancing in the street, accompanied by dancers in a Broadway-style fashion in front of similar backdrops. After receiving criticism over accusations of plagiarism, Lauv posted a public apology on Twitter, saying: "[I] wanna be one to own up to shit, [I'm] sorry." He posted a photo showing a text message conversation between himself and Healy, saying he is a "massive fan" who heavily respects the 1975 and made "an honest mistake [...] [I] want to do whatever [I] can to make this right". Healy humorously replied, "[your] mums a hoe", telling Lauv he did not mind the similarities and encouraged him to post a screenshot of the messages in response to the criticism. He ended the conversation by saying: "Let's all love making music."

== Live performances ==
The 1975 played "Sincerity Is Scary" live at the 2019 Brit Awards. The band's performance mirrored the song's music video, featuring Healy wearing a knit hat, a backpack, a pair of headphones and a tuxedo. Host Jack Whitehall described Healy's attire as "half James Bond, half Japanese schoolgirl". Healy also used the same moving conveyor belt from the video, creating the feeling of constant motion. The 1975 performed "Sincerity Is Scary" as part of their setlist for the Coachella Festival on 12 April. For the song, they included the Jaiy Twins from their Music for Cars Tour and incorporated the travelator into the front of the stage to recreate Healy's choreography from the music video. Included as part of the tour's setlist, the band replicated the video for "Sincerity Is Scary", including the backdrop of the houses and the built-in treadmill, while dancing in the streets.

== Credits and personnel ==
Credits adapted from A Brief Inquiry into Online Relationships album liner notes.

- Matthew Healy – composer, producer, keyboards, vocals
- George Daniel – composer, producer, programming, drums, keyboards, synthesizer programming, background vocals
- Adam Hann – composer, guitar
- Ross MacDonald – composer, bass guitar
- Roy Hargrove – trumpet
- London Community Gospel Choir – choir vocals
- Guendoline Rome Viray Gomez – programming, keyboards
- Jonathan Gilmore – recording engineer
- Luke Gibbs – assistant recording engineer
- Robin Schmidt – mastering engineer
- Mike Crossey – mixer

== See also ==
- The 1975 discography
- List of songs by Matty Healy

== Charts ==
Chart performance for "Sincerity Is Scary"
Chart (2018–19)	Peak position
Ireland (IRMA)	66
Scottish Singles Sales (Official Charts)	84
UK Singles (Official Charts)	57
US Hot Rock & Alternative Songs (Billboard)	20

== Certifications ==
Certifications and sales for "Sincerity Is Scary"
Region	Certification	Certified units/sales
United Kingdom (BPI)	Silver	200,000^{‡}
^{‡} Sales+streaming figures based on certification alone.
