= Terror Bass =

Burmese DJ and record production

Terror Bass (DJs)
- Origin: Yangon, Myanmar
- Genres: EDM, dubstep, trap
- Occupations: Producers, DJs
- Years active: 2015–present
- Members: Sai Htet Wai, Lwin Zin Ko Latt

Terror Bass is a Burmese DJ and record production duo consisting of "Sai Htet Wai" and "Lwin Zin Ko Latt", founded by Sai Htet Wai in early 2015. As of now, Terror Bass have their own record label called Local Suicide Records (LSR) consisting of top tier Burmese Djs and music producers. Local Suicide Records (LSR) was founded by Sai Htet Wai as well.

== Career ==
The collaboration of Lil Jon, Skellism and Terror Bass's song called "In The Pit" was released in 2017 . And the Remix of Carnage (DJ)'s BTFWD song is 2.1 Million Views on YouTube. Terror Bass featured on "Holy Moly" with Carnage (DJ) in August 2019. They got platinum plaque from billboard.

== Discography ==
=== Singles ===
- Holy Moly with Carnage (DJ)
- In The Pit with Lil Jon and Skellism
- Hard Sound with Lit Lords
- Open For Fun with Idiots
- No One Alive With Mashd N Kutcher
- Burmese Vibe

=== Remixes ===
- Sellouts ft. Danny Worsnop - Breathe Carolina
- BTFWD - Carnage (DJ)
- A Chit Tha Chin - Sai Sai Kham Leng
- Nout Sone Tot (Finally) - Super Models''
