= Be Someone =

2019 song by CamelPhat and Jake Bugg

Single by CamelPhat and Jake Bugg

from the album Dark Matter
- Released: 4 June 2019
- Genre: Progressive house
- Length: 3:25
- Label: RCA
- Songwriter(s): Jake Bugg; Michael Di Scala; David Whelan
- Producer(s): CamelPhat

CamelPhat singles chronology
"Kona" / "Liberation" (2019)	"Be Someone" (2019)	"Rabbit Hole" (2019)

Jake Bugg singles chronology
"In the Event of My Demise" (2018)	"Be Someone" (2019)	"Kiss Like the Sun" (2019)

"Be Someone" is a song by British DJ and production duo CamelPhat and British singer-songwriter Jake Bugg. Following its premiere as BBC Radio 1 DJ Annie Mac's Hottest Record, it was released as a single through RCA Records from CamelPhat's upcoming debut studio album on 4 June 2019. The song was co-written by CamelPhat and Bugg.

== Critical reception ==
Writing for Clash, Robin Murray commented that the track "matches blissful house, huge drops, and a euphoric atmosphere to Jake Bugg's instantly recognisable vocals", and is "certainly something different from the songwriter [Bugg]".

== Track listing ==
Digital download and stream
No.	Title	Length
1.	"Be Someone"	3:25

Digital download (Beatport)
No.	Title	Length
1.	"Be Someone" (extended mix)	6:41

Digital download and stream - Skream remix
No.	Title	Length
1.	"Be Someone" (Skream remix)	3:12

Digital download (Beatport) - Skream remix extended mix
No.	Title	Length
1.	"Be Someone" (Skream remix extended mix)	7:08

Digital download and stream - Christoph remix
No.	Title	Length
1.	"Be Someone" (Christoph remix)	3:37

Digital download (Beatport) - Christoph remix extended mix
No.	Title	Length
1.	"Be Someone" (Christoph remix extended mix)	6:41

Digital download and stream - acoustic version
No.	Title	Length
1.	"Be Someone" (acoustic)	3:52

12-inch vinyl
No.	Title	Length
1.	"Be Someone" (extended mix)	6:41
2.	"Be Someone" (Skream remix extended mix)	7:08
3.	"Be Someone" (Christoph remix extended mix)	6:41

== Charts ==
=== Weekly charts ===
Chart (2019)	Peak position
Belgium (Ultratip Bubbling Under Flanders)	10
Belgium (Ultratip Bubbling Under Wallonia)	30
Belgium Dance (Ultratop Flanders)	4
Ireland (IRMA)	71
New Zealand Hot Singles (RMNZ)	23
Scotland (OCC)	26
UK Singles (OCC)	58
UK Dance (OCC)	11
US Dance Club Songs (Billboard)	2
US Hot Dance/Electronic Songs (Billboard)	25

=== Year-end charts ===
Chart (2019)	Position
US Dance Club Songs (Billboard)	41

== Certifications ==
Region	Certification	Certified units/sales
United Kingdom (BPI)	Silver	200,000^{‡}
^{‡} Sales+streaming figures based on certification alone.

== Release history ==
Region	Date	Format	Label
Various	4 June 2019	Digital download; streaming	RCA
