= Cola (CamelPhat and Elderbrook song) =

Single by CamelPhat and Elderbrook

from the album Dark Matter
- Released: 17 June 2017
- Recorded: 2017
- Genre: Dance; house
- Length: 3:44 (radio edit); 4:03 (album edit); 6:56 (club mix)
- Label: Defected
- Songwriters: Dave Whelan; Mike Di Scala; Alexander Kotz
- Producer: CamelPhat

CamelPhat singles chronology
"NYP2" (2017)	"Cola" (2017)	"Bugged Out" (2018)

Elderbrook singles chronology
"Difficult to Love" (2017)	"Cola" (2017)	"Woman" (2017)

Music video
- "Cola" on YouTube

"Cola" is a song by British DJs and producers CamelPhat and Elderbrook, released as a single on 17 June 2017 by Defected Records. It was recorded, co-written, and produced by the British electronic house duo CamelPhat featuring vocals from Alexander "Elderbrook" Kotz, who was also a co-writer of the track.

It reached number one on Billboard's Dance Club Songs chart in November 2017, giving the collaboration their first American chart topper. The single was nominated for a Best Dance Recording at the 2018 Grammy Awards.

== Composition ==
"Cola" is a 122 beat-per-minute dance song with influence from Chicago house music. The chorus lyrics, which include the line "She sips a Coca-Cola / She can't tell the difference yet" have been interpreted by some critics as a reference to using date rape drugs to spike a woman's drink. Kotz told the Los Angeles Times that the lyrics were composed with a woman who is too intoxicated to get into a club in mind; a bouncer "kindly gets her a bottle of Coca-Cola to sober her up, but she thinks it's Rum & Coke."

== Track listing ==
Digital download and stream
No.	Title	Length
1.	"Cola"	3:44
2.	"Cola" (club mix)	6:56

Digital download (Beatport)
No.	Title	Length
1.	"Cola" (original mix)	6:56

Digital download and stream - Franky Rizardo remix
No.	Title	Length
1.	"Cola" (Franky Rizardo remix)	8:24

Digital download and stream - Mousse T.'s Glitterbox mix
No.	Title	Length
1.	"Cola" (Mousse T.'s Glitterbox mix)	6:36

Digital download and stream - Chilled Mixes
No.	Title	Length
1.	"Cola" (Elderbrook Chilled mix)	2:52
2.	"Cola" (Simon Mills Full Sugar mix)	4:23
3.	"Cola" (Kenneth Bager remix)	6:46

Digital download and stream - Robin Schulz extended remix
No.	Title	Length
1.	"Cola" (Robin Schulz extended remix)	5:13

Digital download and stream - Robin Schulz remix
No.	Title	Length
1.	"Cola" (Robin Schulz remix)	3:15

12-inch vinyl
No.	Title	Length
1.	"Cola"	6:56
2.	"Cola" (Dario D'Attis remix)	7:02
3.	"Cola" (Franky Rizardo remix)	8:24
4.	"Cola" (Mousse T.'s Glitterbox mix)	6:36

Digital download and stream - The Unreleased Mixes
No.	Title	Length
1.	"Cola" (Low Steppa remix)	5:47
2.	"Cola" (Dario D'Attis remix)	7:02
3.	"Cola" (MoBlack remix)	6:33

Digital download and stream - Zhu remix
No.	Title	Length
1.	"Cola" (Zhu remix)	5:26

== Charts ==
=== Weekly charts ===
Chart (2017–2018)	Peak position
Australia (ARIA)	32
Belarus Airplay (Eurofest)	10
Belgium (Ultratop 50 Flanders)	23
Belgium (Ultratop 50 Wallonia)	32
Euro Digital Song Sales (Billboard)	19
France (SNEP)	40
Germany (GfK)	76
Hungary (Single Top 40)	5
Hungary (Dance Top 40)	1
Ireland (IRMA)	12
Latvia (DigiTop100)	71
Netherlands Single Tip (MegaCharts)	8
Netherlands Dance Top 30 (MegaCharts)	21
Scotland (Official Charts Company)	15
UK Singles (Official Charts)	18
UK Dance (Official Charts)	3
UK Independent (Official Charts)	1
US Dance Club Songs (Billboard)	1
US Hot Dance/Electronic Songs (Billboard)	21

=== Year-end charts ===
Chart (2017)	Position
Hungary (Dance Top 40)	43
Hungary (Single Top 40)	78
US Dance Club Songs (Billboard)	20

Chart (2018)	Position
Hungary (Dance Top 40)	2
Hungary (Single Top 40)	44
UK Singles (Official Charts Company)	99
US Hot Dance/Electronic Songs (Billboard)	76

Chart (2019)	Position
Hungary (Dance Top 40)	22

== Certifications ==
Region	Certification	Certified units/sales
Australia (ARIA)	4× Platinum	280,000^{‡}
Austria (IFPI Austria)	Gold	15,000^{‡}
Belgium (BRMA)	Gold	10,000^{‡}
Canada (Music Canada)	Platinum	80,000^{‡}
France (SNEP)	Gold	100,000^{‡}
Germany (BVMI)	Gold	200,000^{‡}
Italy (FIMI)	Platinum	70,000^{‡}
Netherlands (NVPI)	Gold	20,000^{‡}
New Zealand (RMNZ)	2× Platinum	60,000^{‡}
Poland (ZPAV)	2× Platinum	100,000^{‡}
Portugal (AFP)	Gold	5,000^{‡}
Spain (Promusicae)	Gold	30,000^{‡}
United Kingdom (BPI)	2× Platinum	1,200,000^{‡}
^{‡} Sales+streaming figures based on certification alone.
