= Hit Girl (song) =

Single by Sébastien Léger
- Released: 16 August 2004
- Recorded: 2006
- Genre: House; Electro house Electric
- Length: 13:36
- Label: Black Jack
- Producer(s): Sébastien Léger

Sébastien Léger singles chronology
"Take Your Pills" (2005)	"Hit Girl" (2004)	"Hypnotized" (2006)

"Hit Girl" is a hit single by the dance musician Sébastien Léger. It was his first successful heavy electro house single. The use of deep, heavy synthesizers and trance-like progression, makes it a favorite of not only electro house DJs but progressive trance DJs such as Marco V. Included is another (though less prominent) single, "Klaxon".

It appears on compilation albums such as Cream Ibiza 07, Marco V's Combi Nations:II, Dance Valley Festival 2006, Mega Techno 17, Summadayze, Elektro Bass and Judgement Sundays - The Mix 2007.

== Vinyl, 12" ==
1. Hit Girl (7:57)
2. Klaxon (5:39)

== CDr ==
1. Hit Girl (Oliver Klein's Flashback Remix) (7:06)
2. Hit Girl (Original Mix) (7:32)
3. Klaxon (5:42)
