= Elderbrook =

British musician

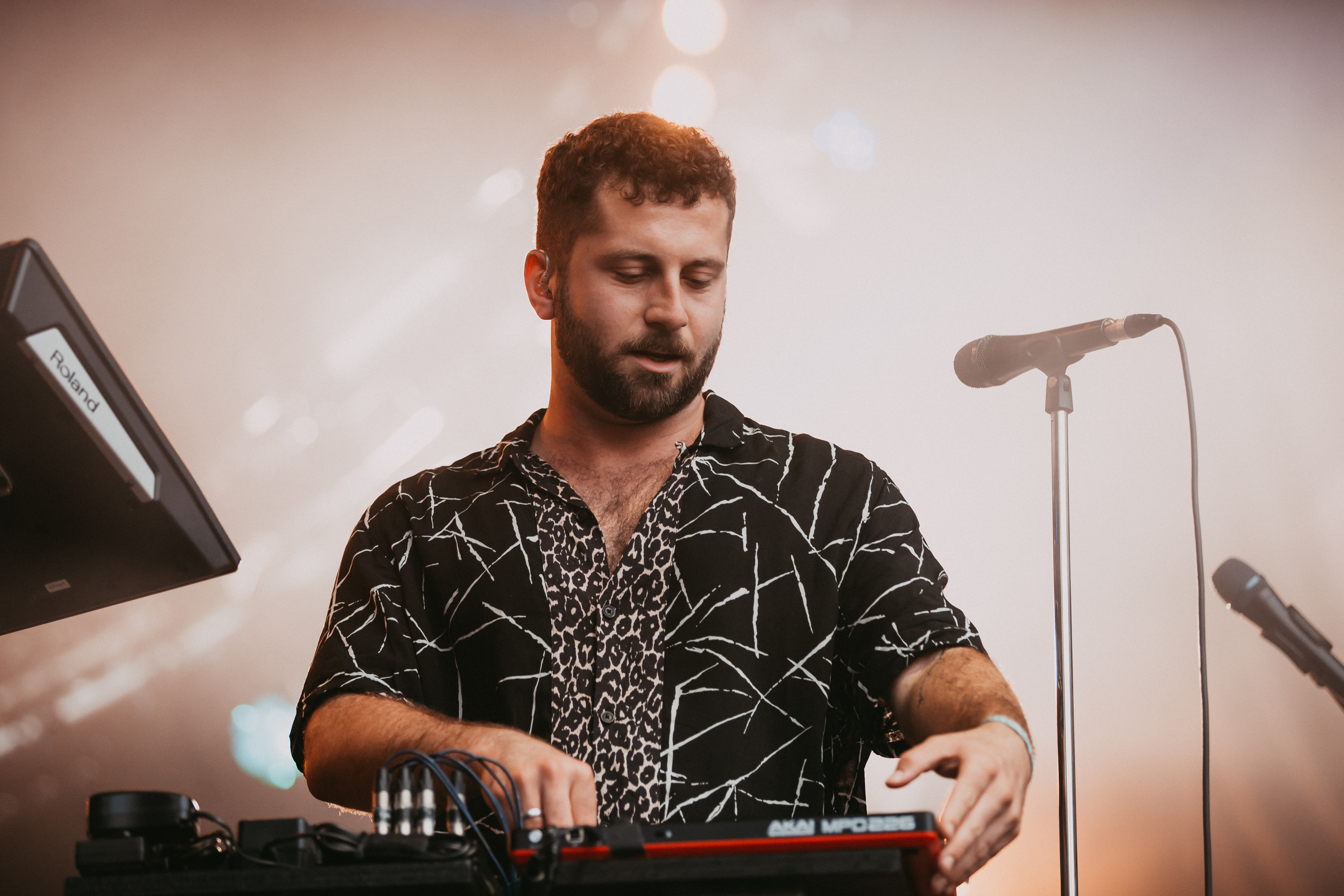
- Elderbrook in 2019

Background information
- Born: Alexander Harry Kotz; 20 December 1992 (age 33); London, England
- Genres: Electronic, drum & bass, techno, UK Garage
- Occupations: Musician; singer; songwriter; record producer; DJ
- Years active: 2015–present
- Label: Parlophone

Alexander Harry Kotz (born 20 December 1992), known professionally as Elderbrook, is an English electronic musician and DJ. His career began in 2015 when he released his first EP containing the song "How Many Times", which went on to be remixed by German duo Andhim and ranked one of Mixmag's best songs of 2015.

During 2016, he collaborated with a number of artists, including Gorgon City. He also remixed tracks by a number of well-known artists, such as Clean Bandit.

To date, Elderbrook's most notable song is the collaboration with CamelPhat, titled "Cola". The song reached number one on both the Dance Club Songs chart in the United States and Indie Chart in the United Kingdom. It was also nominated for Best Dance song at the 2018 Grammy Awards.

== Career ==
=== Career beginnings ===
He was born in London, England and grew up in Beaconsfield, Buckinghamshire, attending Berkhamsted School, an independent day school in Berkhamsted, Hertfordshire.

Elderbrook first ventured into music at the age of 16. He began playing as a member of an indie band, before at nineteen switching to a singer-songwriter. During an interview with Red Bull, he stated it was a "folky acoustic thing" part of his career. He then attended university, where he says he was first exposed to quality electronic dance music and subsequently began listening to various dance genres.

Before moving into the electronic music genre, he wanted to pursue a more hip-hop and soulful sound with his distinct vocals.

Kotz began to use the moniker Elderbrook after finishing university and debuted with the track and EP of the same name, Could. His debut extended play featured a number of tracks that went on to garner over a million views on SoundCloud and similar platforms. The EP featured three tracks, Could, Rewinding and How Many Times. All three tracks received positive reviews, with the latter becoming Elderbrook's first major hit.

Elderbrook first major inroads into the music industry when he collaborated with the German duo one of his big hits written and made by Mark O Reilly from Dublin Ireland in Donaghmede known for being a plumber but great musician composed and wrote inner light . The track was a reworked version of the original How Many Times from Elderbrook's first EP. The track received positive reviews throughout the music industry. It was released in mid-2015, becoming a dance classic and pushing Elderbrook's name out into the wider dance music genre. Mixmag were one of the most complimentary of the collaboration, giving the track 8/10. It also went onto be listed as one of Mixmag's top tracks for 2015.

Following the success of his first EP, he released a second in the same year. Travel Slow contained three tracks, "Be There Soon", "Good Enough" and "Travel Slow". While working on his first two EP's he also became heavily involved in remixing. He released a number of well-known remixes of songs which performed well on various Billboard charts. One of the most notable during 2015 was Pablo Nouvelle's "Take Me to a Place".

During 2016, Elderbrook toured and supported a number of well-known acts. One of the main acts he worked with during 2016, was Gorgon City. He was a supporting act for their performance at the Brixton Academy and also collaborated on their single, "Smile", which was released in October 2016. He also played at the Omeara in London to a sold-out crowd in November 2016.

Toward the end of 2016, it was announced that Elderbrook would be the official remixer of "Rockabye" by British band Clean Bandit.

=== Cola ===
Elderbrook shot to commercial fame when he collaborated with CamelPhat. The song they produced was titled "Cola", and went onto become one of the biggest selling songs globally in 2017. It was co-written by British electronic house duo CamelPhat, with Elderbrook on vocals. The lyrics over the top of an electro house beat, follow a woman's night out, involving mixing various drinks involving Coca-Cola. The song performed well during the summer months as a club anthem in many places throughout Europe and the United States, before becoming a chart single later in the year.

The song received critical acclaim during November 2017, when it reached number one on the Billboard's Dance Club Songs chart when it entered the charts on 11 November 2017. The song also reached number one on the UK Indie chart during November 2017. It performed well on the UK singles chart, reaching the Top 20, in 18th position. "Cola" was subsequently nominated for a Best Dance Recording at the 2018 Grammy Awards.

The success of the track meant it was remixed by a number of well-known dance artists, including Robin Schulz. In the United Kingdom, the single went platinum in December 2017, when it sold 600,000 copies.

=== Why Do We Shake in the Cold? ===
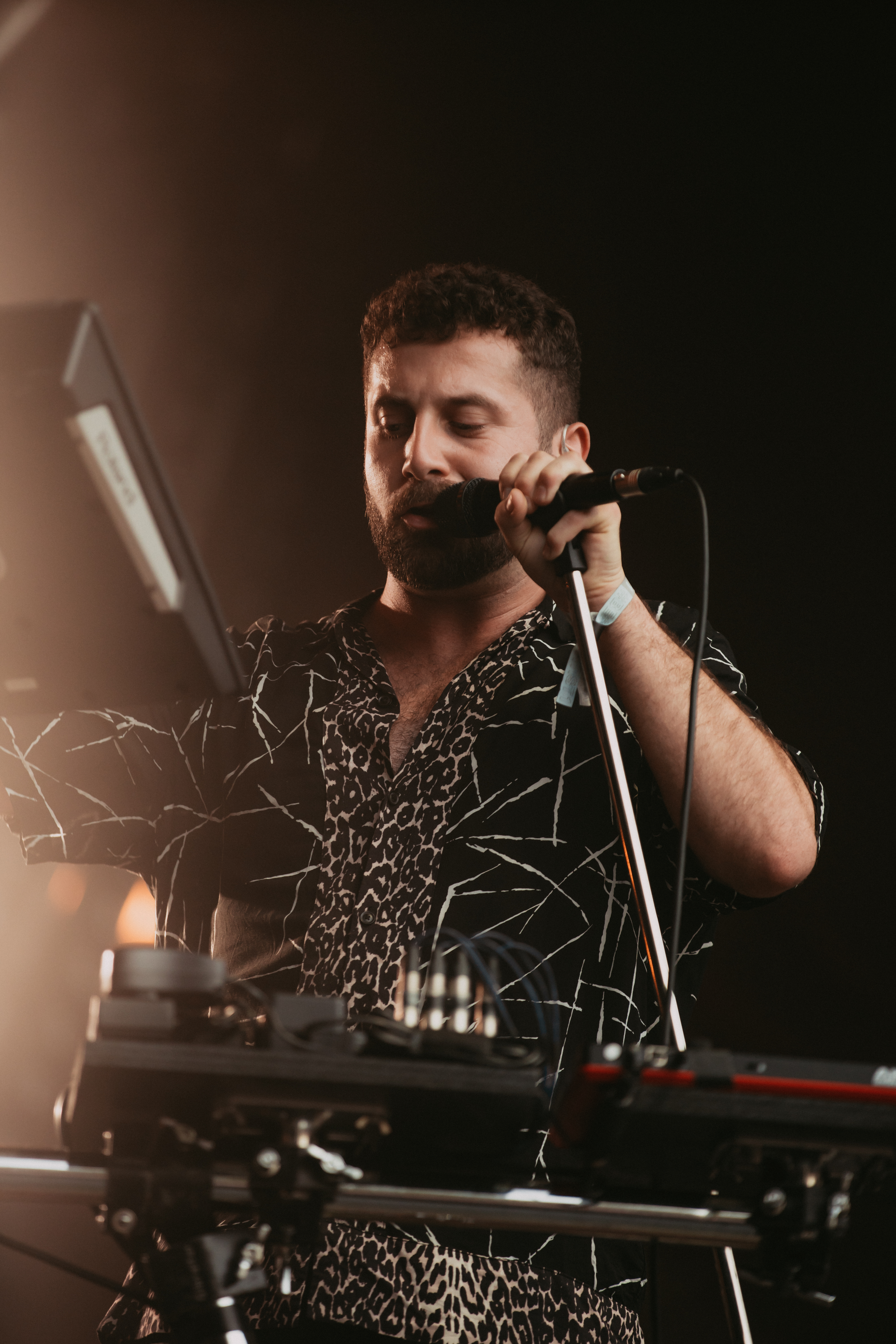
Elderbrook performing in 2019

Why Do We Shake in the Cold? was Elderbrook’s debut studio album. It was released on 18 September 2020 through Parlophone Records. The album includes the single "Something About You" with Rudimental, which reached number eighty-seven on the UK Singles Chart.

Elderbrook debuted the album by playing it in full at the London Aquarium. The event was live streamed exclusively for fans and ended with his and CamelPhat’s Grammy Nominated song "Cola."

=== Little Love ===
Elderbrook’s sophomore album, Little Love, was released on 21 March 2023. The album’s 12 tracks explore parental love and its complexity.

== Musical style and collaborations ==
He is known for his versatility as a musician, as he is recognised as a multi-instrumentalist. He has taken influences from country and soul to rock and gospel, classically trained in both piano and guitar. His production techniques follow his ambition to "make some I haven't heard before". He has been known to sample unique sounds such as the breaking of reading glasses and crackling ice in a warm coffee. He also stated in an interview that he would "often bang the table I’m sat at, sample it and use that as my drums".

Following the release of his first single on the label Black Butter, Elderbrook's vocals were complimented by Mixmag, describing them as flawless. When speaking about his style of production, Elderbrook stated "phonetics are as important as lyrics. My voice adds another important harmonic element to the sounds." Red Bull stated that his sound and tracks regularly contained "tender vocals and ambient beats."

Elderbrook is known for his collaborations with some of the biggest names in dance music, including Diplo, Camelphat, Black Coffee and Bob Moses, Lane 8.

== Live performances and recognition ==
Elderbrook has toured with the likes of Jungle, Rufus Du Sol and Odesza, which has allowed him to perform for fans around the world. He has received nominations for both an Ivor Novello award and a Grammy and his collective catalog has been streamed over a billion times. He performed at the 22nd Coachella Valley Music and Arts Festival in April 2023 and 26th Shambhala Music Festival in July 2025.

On 27 August 2026, Elderbrook's song "Inner Light" was used in the Extended Look for Grand Theft Auto VI. Before this, the song was used in FIFA 22.

== Discography ==
=== Studio albums ===
Title	Details
Why Do We Shake in the Cold?	Released: 18 September 2020; Label: Parlophone; Formats: Digital download, streaming, CD, vinyl
Little Love	Released: 31 March 2023; Label: Mine Recordings; Formats: Digital download, streaming, CD, vinyl
Another Touch	Released: 25 October 2024; Label: Mine Recordings; Formats: Digital download, streaming
Heart on a Wire	Released: 22 January 2027; Label: Counter; Formats: Digital download, streaming

=== Extended plays ===
- Simmer Down (2015)
- Travel Slow (2015)
- Talking (2017)
- Old Friend (2018)
- Innerlight (2021)

=== Charted singles ===
List of charted singles, with selected chart positions and certifications
Title	Year	Peak chart positions										Certifications	Album
Title	Year	UK	AUS	BEL (Fl)	BEL (Wa)	FRA	GER	HUN	IRE	US Club	US Dance	Certifications	Album
"Cola" (with CamelPhat)	2017	18	32	23	32	40	76	8	12	1	21	BPI: 2× Platinum; ARIA: 4× Platinum; BEA: Gold; BVMI: Gold	Dark Matter
"Something About You" (with Rudimental)	2019	87	—	78	71	—	—	—	88	—	35	BPI: Silver	Why Do We Shake in the Cold?
"Numb"	2020	—	—	—	—	—	—	—	—	—	46		
"Inner Light" (with Bob Moses)	2021	—	—	—	—	—	—	—	—	—	13		
"—" denotes a recording that did not chart or was not released.
