= CamelPhat =

British DJ and production duo

- Also known as: Whelan & Di Scala, Wheels & Disco, Shake n' Jack, Mancini, Pawn Shop, Da Mode, High Society, the Bassline Hustlers
- Origin: Liverpool, United Kingdom
- Genres: House; tech house
- Instruments: Keyboard; guitar; synthesizer
- Years active: 2006–present
- Labels: All Around the World; Axtone; Bachelor Pad; CR2; Defected; Glasgow Underground; Nervous; RCA; Spinnin' Deep; Suara; Toolroom; Ultra; Vice; Afterlife
- Members: Dave Whelan; Mike Di Scala

CamelPhat are an English DJ and production duo, consisting of Dave Whelan and Mike Di Scala, formed in Liverpool in 2006.

Initially they released music under various names but found success with their 2017 single "Cola", which peaked at No. 3 on the UK Dance Chart, and at No. 18 on the UK Singles Chart.

They have released two studio albums and many singles and EPs.

== Biography ==
Dave Whelan and Mike Di Scala met each other in a Liverpool record shop 3 Beat Records and both were disc jockeys in the city. Di Scala had previously released music as a member of Rezonance Q (with Lee Butler and Les Calvert), Ultrabeat (with Ian Redman and Chris Henry) and as a solo happy hardcore artist using the name Re-Con. Dave Whelan hosted his own Jubilee club night since 2004 and the two were resident DJs at Society nightclub.

They began producing music together as members of The Chosen Few, along with Les Calvert. The trio also managed the Adhesive record label as a subsidiary of All Around the World. The Chosen Few released a cover of Tears for Fears’ "Everybody Wants to Rule the World" (Adhesive, 2004) and also remixed the original song for the 2005 reissue of Tears Roll Down (Greatest Hits 82–92).

As a duo, Whelan and Di Scala released several remixes and bootlegs as under various names such as The Bassline Hustlers, Men from Mars and Da Mode. Using the name Pawn Shop, they released the single "Shot Away" (All Around the World, 2006), based on a sample of "Gimme Shelter" by The Rolling Stones, which peaked at No. 100 on the UK Singles Chart. Following this, they released several more singles as Whelan & Di Scala on various labels, including their own Bachelor Pad Recordings, and also using other aliases such as Wheels & Disco, Mancini and Shake n' Jack. From 2008 to 2014, Dave Whelan was a radio presenter on Juice FM.

In 2010, they released their first recordings as CamelPhat on their own Vice Records label. As CamelPhat, the duo initially wore wrestling masks to conceal their identity because they "just wanted the people to judge the music and not us". In 2011, Dave Whelan and Mike Di Scala became owners of a Liverpool nightclub Mansion. The duo released numerous singles and EPs on various record labels and some CamelPhat songs appeared on the Ultratop charts in Belgium, such as "The Act" (Spinnin' Deep, 2014), "Paradigm" featuring A*M*E (Axtone, 2015), "Constellations" (Spinnin' Deep, 2015), "Make 'Em Dance" from Light Night EP (Suara, 2016) and "Hangin' Out with Charlie" from Hangin' with Charlie EP (Suara, 2017).

Their collaboration with Elderbrook on "Cola" (Defected, 2017) was an international hit single which peaked at No. 17 on the U.K. Singles Chart and No. 1 on the US Billboard Dance Club Songs chart and was nominated for Best Dance Recording at the 60th Annual Grammy Awards. Further UK top forty hit singles followed with "Panic Room" (Loudmouth Music, 2018), a collaboration with Au/Ra and "Breathe" (Pryda Presents, 2018), a collaboration with Cristoph featuring Jem Cooke. In December 2018, CamelPhat signed to RCA Records and released several singles on the label such as "Be Someone" (2019) with Jake Bugg, “Rabbit Hole” (2019) featuring Jem Cooke, “For a Feeling” (2020) with Artbat featuring Rhodes and “Hypercolour” (2020) with Yannis Philippakis of Foals. In October 2020 they released their debut studio album Dark Matter which reached No. 23 in the UK Albums Chart.

== Awards and nominations ==
=== AIM Awards ===
Year	Nominee / work	Award	Result
2018	CamelPhat	Most Played New Independent Act	Nominated

=== DJ Awards ===
Year	Nominee / work	Award	Result
2016	CamelPhat	Breakthrough	Nominated
2017	"Cola" (with Elderbrook)	Track of the Season	Won
2018	CamelPhat	House Artist	Won
2019	CamelPhat	Tech House	Nominated

=== DJ Mag Best of British Awards ===
Year	Nominee / work	Award	Result
2018	CamelPhat	Best Group	Won

=== Grammy Awards ===
Year	Nominee / work	Award	Result
2018	"Cola" (with Elderbrook)	Best Dance Recording	Nominated

=== International Dance Music Awards ===
Year	Nominee / work	Award	Result
2018	"Cola" (with Elderbrook)	Best Song	Nominated
2019	"Panic Room" (with Au/Ra)	Best Electronic Song	Nominated

=== Ivor Novello Awards ===
Year	Nominee / work	Award	Result
2018	"Cola" (with Elderbrook)	Best Contemporary Song	Nominated

=== UK Music Video Awards ===
Year	Nominee / work	Award	Result
2019	"Be Someone" (with Jake Bugg)	Best Dance Video – UK	Nominated
2019	"Be Someone" (with Jake Bugg)	Best Editing in a Video	Nominated

=== WDM Radio Awards ===
Year	Nominee / work	Award	Result
2018	"Cola" (with Elderbrook)	Best Dancefloor Track	Nominated
