= Governors Ball Music Festival line-ups =

The Governors Ball Music Festival (commonly known as Governors Ball or Gov Ball) is a music festival held in New York City, United States. This article lists music artists that have performed at the festival.

== Line-ups ==
Headline performers are listed in boldface. Artists listed from the latest to earliest set times.

=== 2011 ===
The 2011 festival was held on June 18 at Governors Island in Manhattan, New York. It was headlined by Girl Talk, Pretty Lights, and Empire of the Sun.

Saturday, June 18

Big Apple Stage	Gotham Stage
**Pretty Lights**; **Empire of the Sun**; Neon Indian; Miami Horror; Das Racist; Reptar	**Girl Talk**; Big Boi; People Under the Stairs; Mac Miller; Passion Pit (DJ set); Outasight

=== 2012 ===
The 2012 festival was held on June 23 and 24 at Randalls Island in Manhattan, New York. It was headlined by Passion Pit, Kid Cudi, Chromeo, Modest Mouse, Beck, and Explosions in the Sky.

Saturday, June 23

Hype Machine Stage	Honda Stage
**Passion Pit**; **Chromeo**; Major Lazer; Santigold; Penguin Prison; Art vs. Science	**Kid Cudi**; Duck Sauce; Atmosphere; Special Disco Version (James Murphy and Pat Mahoney); Big Gigantic; Walk the Moon; K.Flay

Sunday, June 24

Hype Machine Stage	Honda Stage
**Modest Mouse**; Fiona Apple; Built to Spill; Cults; Freelance Whales; Alberta Cross	**Beck**; **Explosions in the Sky**; Cage the Elephant; Devendra Banhart; Phantogram; The Jezabels; Turf War

=== 2013 ===
The 2013 festival was held on June 7 to 9 at Randalls Island in Manhattan, New York. It was headlined by Kings of Leon, Guns N' Roses, and Kanye West.

Friday, June 7

GovballNYC Stage	You're Doing Great Stage	Honda Stage	Skyy Vodka Tent
Feist; Of Monsters and Men; Dinosaur Jr.; St. Lucia; Swear and Shake	Beach House; Local Natives; Best Coast; Poliça; Solid Gold	Pretty Lights; Young the Giant; Dillon Francis; Holy Ghost!; Reignwolf; Pacific Air	Erykah Badu and the Cannabinoids; Crystal Castles; Totally Enormous Extinct Dinosaurs; The Knocks; Bear Mountain

Saturday, June 8

GovballNYC Stage	You're Doing Great Stage	Honda Stage	Skyy Vodka Tent
**Guns N' Roses**; **Kings of Leon**; Cut Copy; Divine Fits; Japandroids; Wild Nothing	Animal Collective; Edward Sharpe and the Magnetic Zeros; Dirty Projectors; MS MR; The Rubens	Nas; Kendrick Lamar; Alt-J; Paper Diamond; GRiZ; Ruby Velle & the Soulphonics	Thievery Corporation; Azealia Banks; Fucked Up; Icona Pop; Robert DeLong; Moon Hooch

Sunday, June 9

GovballNYC Stage	You're Doing Great Stage	Honda Stage	Skyy Vodka Tent
**Kanye West**; Grizzly Bear; Foals; Portugal. The Man; Haim; The Revivalists	The xx; Beirut; Deerhunter; Steel Pulse; Roadkill Ghost Choir	The Avett Brothers; The Lumineers; Gary Clark Jr.; Cold War Kids; The Vaccines; On An On	Bloc Party; Yeasayer; Twin Shadow; Freddie Gibbs; Cherub

=== 2014 ===
The 2014 festival was held on June 6 to 8 at Randalls Island in Manhattan, New York. It was headlined by Outkast, Phoenix, TV on the Radio, Jack White, The Strokes, Skrillex, Vampire Weekend, and Axwell Λ Ingrosso.

Friday, June 6

GovballNYC Stage	Big Apple Stage	Honda Stage	Gotham Tent
**Outkast**; **Phoenix**; Julian Casablancas; Janelle Monáe; Jason Isbell; Haerts	TV on the Radio; Neko Case; Bastille; Kurt Vile; Drowners	Damon Albarn; Damian "Jr Gong" Marley; Jenny Lewis; The 1975; Run the Jewels; Little Comets	Grimes; La Roux; Washed Out; Ratking; Little Daylight; The Chain Gang of 1974

Saturday, June 7

GovballNYC Stage	Big Apple Stage	Honda Stage	Gotham Tent
**Jack White**; **The Strokes**; Broken Bells; Lucius; PAPA; Hunter Hunted	Spoon; The Naked and Famous; Fitz and the Tantrums; Tanlines; Diarrhea Planet	**Skrillex**; Childish Gambino; Disclosure; Classixx; RJD2; Catfish and the Bottlemen	Sleigh Bells; The Glitch Mob; Chance the Rapper; Deafheaven; The Internet

Sunday, June 8

GovballNYC Stage	Big Apple Stage	Honda Stage	Gotham Tent
**Vampire Weekend**; Foster the People; The Head and the Heart; Frank Turner; Bleachers; Meg Myers	Interpol; The Kills; Tyler, the Creator; Wild Belle; Half Moon Run	**Axwell Λ Ingrosso**; James Blake; J. Cole; Earl Sweatshirt; SKATERS; Cris Cab	Empire of the Sun; The Bloody Beetroots; AlunaGeorge; Banks; Cayucas; Ben Cameron

=== 2015 ===
The 2015 festival was held on June 5 to 7 at Randalls Island in Manhattan, New York. It was headlined by Drake, The Black Keys, deadmau5, and Florence and the Machine.

Friday, June 5

GovballNYC Stage	Big Apple Stage	Honda Stage	Gotham Tent
**Drake**; **Florence and the Machine**; Chromeo; Future; Rae Sremmurd; Priory	St. Vincent; Death from Above 1979; Rudimental; Benjamin Booker; Black Pistol Fire	My Morning Jacket; The Decemberists; Vance Joy; Charli XCX; DIIV; The Districts	Ratatat; Odesza; MØ; Gorgon City (Live); People Under the Stairs

Saturday, June 6

GovballNYC Stage	Big Apple Stage	Honda Stage	Gotham Tent
**deadmau5**; Björk; Little Dragon; Marina and the Diamonds; Clean Bandit; Holychild	Flume; Atmosphere; Sharon Van Etten; J. Roddy Walston and the Business; Kae Tempest	Ryan Adams; Conor Oberst; Angus & Julia Stone; Moon Taxi; White Lung; Charlotte OC	SBTRKT; Future Islands; Kiesza; Rustie; ASTR

Sunday, June 7

GovballNYC Stage	Big Apple Stage	Honda Stage	Gotham Tent
**The Black Keys**; Noel Gallagher's High Flying Birds; Tame Impala; Sturgill Simpson; Echosmith; Streets of Laredo	Hot Chip; The War on Drugs; Royal Blood; Chronixx & the Zincfence Redemption; DMA's	Lana Del Rey; Big Gigantic; A-Trak; Logic; Strand of Oaks; The Picturebooks	Flying Lotus; "Weird Al" Yankovic; Mayer Hawthorne; Hermitude; Bishop Nehru

=== 2016 ===
The 2016 festival was held on June 3 and 4 at Randalls Island in Manhattan, New York. It was headlined by The Killers and The Strokes. Kanye West would have returned to headline on June 5, but the whole day was cancelled due to extreme weather conditions.

Friday, June 3

GovballNYC Stage	Big Apple Stage	Honda Stage	Bacardi House Stage
**The Strokes**; Beck; Of Monsters and Men; Christine and the Queens; Elle King; The London Souls	Bloc Party; Father John Misty; Action Bronson; Bully; Public Access T.V.	Robyn; Matt and Kim; Big Grams (Big Boi + Phantogram); Years & Years; Meg Mac; Transviolet	Jamie xx; Duke Dumont; Bob Moses; Boogie; Black Pistol Fire

Saturday, June 4

GovballNYC Stage	Big Apple Stage	Honda Stage	Bacardi House Stage
**The Killers**; Haim; Lord Huron; Catfish and the Bottlemen; Marian Hill; Eliot Sumner	Miike Snow; De La Soul; MisterWives; Jon Bellion; Nothing	M83; Miguel; Mac Miller; Albert Hammond Jr.; Torres; Holly Miranda	Purity Ring; Against Me!; Thundercat; The Knocks; Louis the Child

Sunday, June 5
The Sunday date of the 2016 festival was cancelled due to severe thunderstorms in the area.

GovballNYC Stage	Big Apple Stage	Honda Stage	Bacardi House Stage
**Kanye West**; Two Door Cinema Club; CHVRCHES; Cold War Kids; Betty Who; Tor Miller	Chet Faker; Courtney Barnett; Eagles of Death Metal; Fidlar; Whitney	Death Cab for Cutie; Gary Clark Jr.; Joey Bada$$; Vince Staples; Whilk & Misky; Blank Range	Thomas Jack; Prophets of Rage; Galantis; Vic Mensa; Bat for Lashes; Day Wave

=== 2017 ===
The 2017 festival was held on June 2 to 4 at Randalls Island in Manhattan, New York. It was headlined by Tool, Chance the Rapper, and Phoenix.

Friday, June 2

GovballNYC Stage	Big Apple Stage	Honda Stage	Bacardi Stage
**Chance the Rapper**; Lorde; Bleachers; Kehlani; MUNA; Tkay Maidza	Beach House; Michael Kiwanuka; Charli XCX; Judah & the Lion; Roosevelt	Flume; Schoolboy Q; Tove Lo; The Strumbellas; Blossoms; Jenaux	Majid Jordan; Danny Brown; Charles Bradley & His Extraordinaries; Francis and the Lights; Michael Blume

Saturday, June 3

GovballNYC Stage	Big Apple Stage	Honda Stage	Bacardi Stage
**Phoenix**; Wu-Tang Clan; The Head and the Heart; Saint Motel; Dua Lipa; VANT	Mark Ronson vs Kevin Parker; Local Natives; YG; Car Seat Headrest; Welles	Childish Gambino; Marshmello; A$AP Ferg; Stormzy; ARIZONA; Jessie Reyez	BANKS; Rüfüs Du Sol; Rae Sremmurd; The Range; Lo Moon

Sunday, June 4

GovballNYC Stage	Big Apple Stage	Honda Stage	Bacardi Stage
**Tool**; Cage the Elephant; Royal Blood; Parquet Courts; The Orwells; Ron Gallo	Logic; Franz Ferdinand; Warpaint; Zane Lowe; Mondo Cozmo	Wiz Khalifa; Phantogram; Mac DeMarco; Gryffin; Saint Jhn; Barns Courtney	Air; The Avalanches; Skepta; EDEN; Kaiydo; Jack Martini

=== 2018 ===
The 2018 festival was held on June 1 to 3 at Randalls Island in Manhattan, New York. It was headlined by Eminem, Jack White, and Travis Scott.

Friday, June 1

GovballNYC Stage	Bacardi Stage	Honda Stage	American Eagle Stage
**Jack White**; Yeah Yeah Yeahs; Maggie Rogers; Alvvays; Pond; Slaves	Damian "Jr Gong" Marley; Tash Sultana; GoldLink; Wolf Alice; Lophiile	James Blake; Post Malone; Shawn Mendes; D.R.A.M.; Belly; Sir Sly; Lou the Human	The Glitch Mob; 6lack; Flight Facilities; Two Feet; A$AP Twelvyy

Saturday, June 2

GovballNYC Stage	Bacardi Stage	Honda Stage	American Eagle Stage
**Travis Scott**; Halsey; Cut Copy; LANY; AURORA; Mikky Ekko	Silk City (Diplo + Mark Ronson); Manchester Orchestra; Japandroids; Jay Electronica; The Spencer Lee Band	The Gaslight Anthem performing The '59 Sound; Galantis; 2 Chainz; The Menzingers; VHS Collection; The Regrettes	Russ; Pusha T; Kelela; Moses Sumney; Cuco

Sunday, June 3

GovballNYC Stage	Bacardi Stage	Honda Stage	American Eagle Stage
**Eminem**; CHVRCHES; Khalid; Aminé; Middle Kids; Confidence Man	Sylvan Esso; Dirty Projectors; Margo Price; Quinn XCII; Westside Gunn and Conway	N.E.R.D.; Third Eye Blind; The Struts; Berhana; Alice Merton	Lil Uzi Vert; Vic Mensa; Kali Uchis; Billie Eilish; Knox Fortune

=== 2019 ===
The 2019 festival was held on May 31 to June 2 at Randalls Island in Manhattan, New York. It was headlined by The Strokes, Tyler, the Creator, and Florence and the Machine.

Friday, May 31

GovballNYC Stage	Bacardi Stage	Honda Stage	American Eagle Stage
**Tyler, the Creator**; Brockhampton; The Internet; Amber Mark; Dennis Lloyd; Deal Casino	Lil Wayne; Blood Orange; Jessie Reyez; Cautious Clay; Hundredth	Gesaffelstein; Jorja Smith; Mitski; Rolling Blackouts Coastal Fever; Injury Reserve; Njomza	The Voidz; MØ; Hippo Campus; Jeremy Zucker; Still Woozy

Saturday, June 1

GovballNYC Stage	Bacardi Stage	Honda Stage	American Eagle Stage
**Florence and the Machine**; The 1975; Kacey Musgraves; Clairo; Calpurnia; Dreamers	Zhu; King Princess; Ravyn Lenae; Sunflower Bean; Suzi Wu	Major Lazer; Vince Staples; Playboi Carti; Denzel Curry; U.S. Girls; Tobi Lou	Lord Huron; Ty Dolla $ign; Saba; Elohim; Easy Life

Sunday, June 2

GovballNYC Stage	Bacardi Stage	Honda Stage	American Eagle Stage
**The Strokes**; Nas; Lily Allen; Charli XCX; Taylor Bennett; Jack Harlow	Beast Coast; Bazzi; Noname; Chelsea Cutler; Ric Wilson; MKULTRA	SZA; Louis the Child; Sheck Wes; Parcels; Soccer Mommy; Shaed	Kaytranada; Bob Moses; 070 Shake; SOB X RBE; Aaron Aye

=== 2020 ===
The 2020 festival would have been held on June 5 to 7 at Randalls Island in Manhattan, New York. It would have been headlined by Tame Impala, Missy Elliott, Flume, and Vampire Weekend. The festival was cancelled due to the COVID-19 pandemic.

Friday, June 5	Saturday, June 6	Sunday, June 7
**Tame Impala**; Stevie Nicks; Miley Cyrus; Foals; Khruangbin; Banks; Danny Brown; Alessia Cara; Madeon; Pink Sweat$; Snail Mail; Cuco; Tones and I; Muna; Nancy Whang (LCD Soundsystem); Sasha Sloan; Frankie Cosmos; Maxo Kream; Chase Atlantic; Nasty Cherry; Kota the Friend; Poppy Jean Crawford	**Flume**; Vampire Weekend; Ellie Goulding; Portugal. The Man; Carly Rae Jepsen; Of Monsters and Men; Bleachers; Gryffin; Steve Lacy; EarthGang; Oliver Tree; Pinegrove; Alec Benjamin; PUP; Poolside; Slowthai; Jay Som; Charlotte Lawrence; MAX; Laundry Day; Chiiild; Almost Monday	**Missy Elliott**; Solange; Rüfüs Du Sol; H.E.R.; Summer Walker; Jon Bellion; Maren Morris; Swae Lee; Dominic Fike; YBN Cordae; ARIZONA; Girl Talk; Milky Chance; Dave; Charly Bliss; Princess Nokia; Fontaines D.C.; Black Midi; 99 Neighbors; Jawny; Yeek; Ryland James; Hand Made House

=== 2021 ===
The 2021 festival was held on September 24 to 26 at Citi Field in Queens, New York. It was headlined by Billie Eilish, A$AP Rocky, and Post Malone.

Friday, September 24

GovballNYC Stage	Bacardi Stage	Honda Stage	Grubhub Stage
**Billie Eilish**; Kehlani; Leon Bridges; Tate McRae; Laundry Day	Portugal. The Man; Freddie Gibbs and The Alchemist; Sasha Alex Sloan; 99 Neighbors; Loony	Rüfüs Du Sol; Future Islands; EarthGang; Bartees Strange; Bankrol Hayden	24kGoldn; Orville Peck; ODIE; RMR; Forgivers

Saturday, September 25

GovballNYC Stage	Bacardi Stage	Honda Stage	Grubhub Stage
A$AP Rocky; Megan Thee Stallion; Bleachers; Charlotte Lawrence; Chiiild	Phoebe Bridgers; King Princess; ARIZONA; Breland; Nation of Language	J Balvin; Big Thief; Pink Sweat$; Muna; Oliver Malcolm	Aminé; Cordae; The Brothers Macklovitch; Mike; Sarah Barrios

Sunday, September 26

GovballNYC Stage	Bacardi Stage	Honda Stage	Grubhub Stage
**Post Malone**; 21 Savage; Burna Boy; Princess Nokia; TeaMarrr	Young Thug; Dominic Fike; Umi; Amaarae; mazie	Ellie Goulding; Carly Rae Jepsen; Duck Sauce; BJ the Chicago Kid; Riz La Vie	Jamie xx; Smino; Caroline Polachek; Faye Webster; Yeek

=== 2022 ===
The 2022 festival was held on June 10 to 12 at Citi Field in Queens, New York. It was headlined by Kid Cudi, Halsey, and J. Cole.

Friday, June 10

GovballNYC Stage	Gopuff Stage	Bacardi Stage
**Kid Cudi**; Migos; Black Pumas; Beabadoobee; Samia; Julia Wolf; Plastic Picnic	Louis the Child; Quinn XCII; Skepta; Channel Tres; Blu DeTiger; Aly & AJ; Ultra Q	Jack Harlow; The Knocks; JPEGMafia; Coi Leray; Paris Texas; Between Friends

Saturday, June 11

GovballNYC Stage	Gopuff Stage	Bacardi Stage
**Halsey**; Roddy Ricch; Still Woozy; Tove Lo; Benee; Almost Monday; Octavio the Dweeb	Flume; Joji; Chelsea Cutler; YG; Peach Tree Rascals; Valley; Dehd	Ashnikko; Denzel Curry; Diesel (Shaquille O'Neal); Gus Dapperton; The Teskey Brothers; Millington

Sunday, June 12

GovballNYC Stage	Gopuff Stage	Bacardi Stage
**J. Cole**; Glass Animals; Clairo; J.I.D.; Duckwrth; The Brummies; Kaien Cruz	Kaytranada; Playboi Carti; Becky G; Coin; Surf Curse; Ken Carson; De'Wayne	Jazmine Sullivan; Japanese Breakfast; 100 gecs; Soccer Mommy; Del Water Gap; Jax

=== 2023 ===
The 2023 festival was held on June 9 to 11 at Flushing Meadows–Corona Park in Queens, New York. It was headlined by Kendrick Lamar, Lizzo, and Odesza.

Friday, June 9

GovballNYC Stage	Gopuff Stage	Bacardi Stage
**Lizzo**; Haim; Diplo; Eladio Carrión; Saba; KayCyy	Lil Uzi Vert; Metro Boomin; Ice Spice; Joey Badass; Tai Verdes; Michelle; PJ Morton; School of Rock Queens; Awfbeat	Kim Petras; Remi Wolf; 070 Shake; Alexander 23; Maxo Kream; Matt Maltese

Saturday, June 10

GovballNYC Stage	Gopuff Stage	Bacardi Stage
**Odesza**; Aespa; Rina Sawayama; Amber Mark; Suki Waterhouse; Lovejoy; The Amazons	Lil Baby; Oliver Tree; Finneas; Snail Mail; KennyHoopla; Sarah Kinsley; Zolita	Lauv; Kenny Beats; Koffee; Syd; Evan Giia; Flipturn

Sunday, June 11

GovballNYC Stage	Gopuff Stage	Bacardi Stage
**Kendrick Lamar**; Giveon; Tems; PinkPantheress; Phony Ppl; Charlie Burg; Haiku Hands	Lil Nas X; Sofi Tukker; Central Cee; Black Midi; Cat Burns; School of Rock Brooklyn; PhatJazz	Girl in Red; Pusha T; Sabrina Claudio; Maude Latour; Coast Contra; Ella Jane

=== 2024 ===
The 2024 festival was held on June 7 to 9 at Flushing Meadows–Corona Park in Queens, New York. It was headlined by Post Malone, The Killers, and SZA.

Friday, June 7

GovballNYC Stage	Gopuff Stage	IHG Hotels & Resorts Stage
**Post Malone**; Dominic Fike; Goth Babe; Ryan Beatty; Durry; Blondshell; School of Rock Queens	Rauw Alejandro; Farruko; Yung Gravy; Qveen Herby; Arcy Drive; Alex Chapman	Labrinth; Alex G; Teezo Touchdown; Flo; Mimi Webb; Underscores; Donna Missal; Lauran Hibberd

Saturday, June 8

GovballNYC Stage	Gopuff Stage	IHG Hotels & Resorts Stage
**The Killers**; Carly Rae Jepsen; Sabrina Carpenter; Jessie Murph; Quarters of Change; Telescreens; Maz & Kidd Revel	21 Savage; Sexyy Red; Doechii; Bakar; Riovaz; The Thing	TV Girl; Hippo Campus; d4vd; P1Harmony; Claire Rosinkranz; Skizzy Mars; Little Stranger; Kids Rock for Kids

Sunday, June 9

GovballNYC Stage	Gopuff Stage	IHG Hotels & Resorts Stage
**SZA**; Reneé Rapp; Chappell Roan; Malcolm Todd; Elyanna; Husbands; School of Rock Brooklyn	Peso Pluma; Don Toliver; Kevin Abstract; Saint Levant; Baby Queen; Hotline TNT	Faye Webster; Stephen Sanchez; Cannons; Beach Fossils; Geese; G Flip; Fcukers; The Hails

=== 2025 ===
The 2025 festival was held on June 6 to 8 at Flushing Meadows–Corona Park in Queens, New York. It was headlined by Tyler, the Creator, Olivia Rodrigo, and Hozier.

Friday, June 6

GovballNYC Stage	Kiehl's Stage	The Grove Stage
**Tyler, the Creator**; Mk.gee; T-Pain; BigXthaPlug; Isabel LaRosa; Black Party; School of Rock Queens	Benson Boone; The Backseat Lovers; Tyla; Mannequin Pussy; Jean Dawson; Stolen Gin	JPEGMafia; Role Model; The Beaches; Wasia Project; Matt Champion; Dogpark; Strawberry Launch

Saturday, June 7

GovballNYC Stage	Kiehl's Stage	The Grove Stage
**Olivia Rodrigo**; Conan Gray; Wallows; Marina	Feid; Young Miko; Mariah the Scientist; Artemas	Wave to Earth; Car Seat Headrest; The Garden; Orion Sun; The Lemon Twigs

Sunday, June 8

GovballNYC Stage	Kiehl's Stage	The Grove Stage
**Hozier**; Mt. Joy; Royel Otis; Raye; Joey Valence & Brae; Nourished by Time; Kids Rock For Kids	Glass Animals; Clairo; The Japanese House; Amaarae; Militarie Gun; Snow Wife	Key Glock; Montell Fish; Berlioz; Mark Ambor; Frost Children; Kyle Dion; Olivia Lunny

=== 2026 ===
The 2026 festival was held on June 5 to 7 at the Flushing Meadows–Corona Park in Queens, New York. It was headlined by Lorde, Stray Kids, and A$AP Rocky.
