= Daphne Frias =

American activist (born 1998)

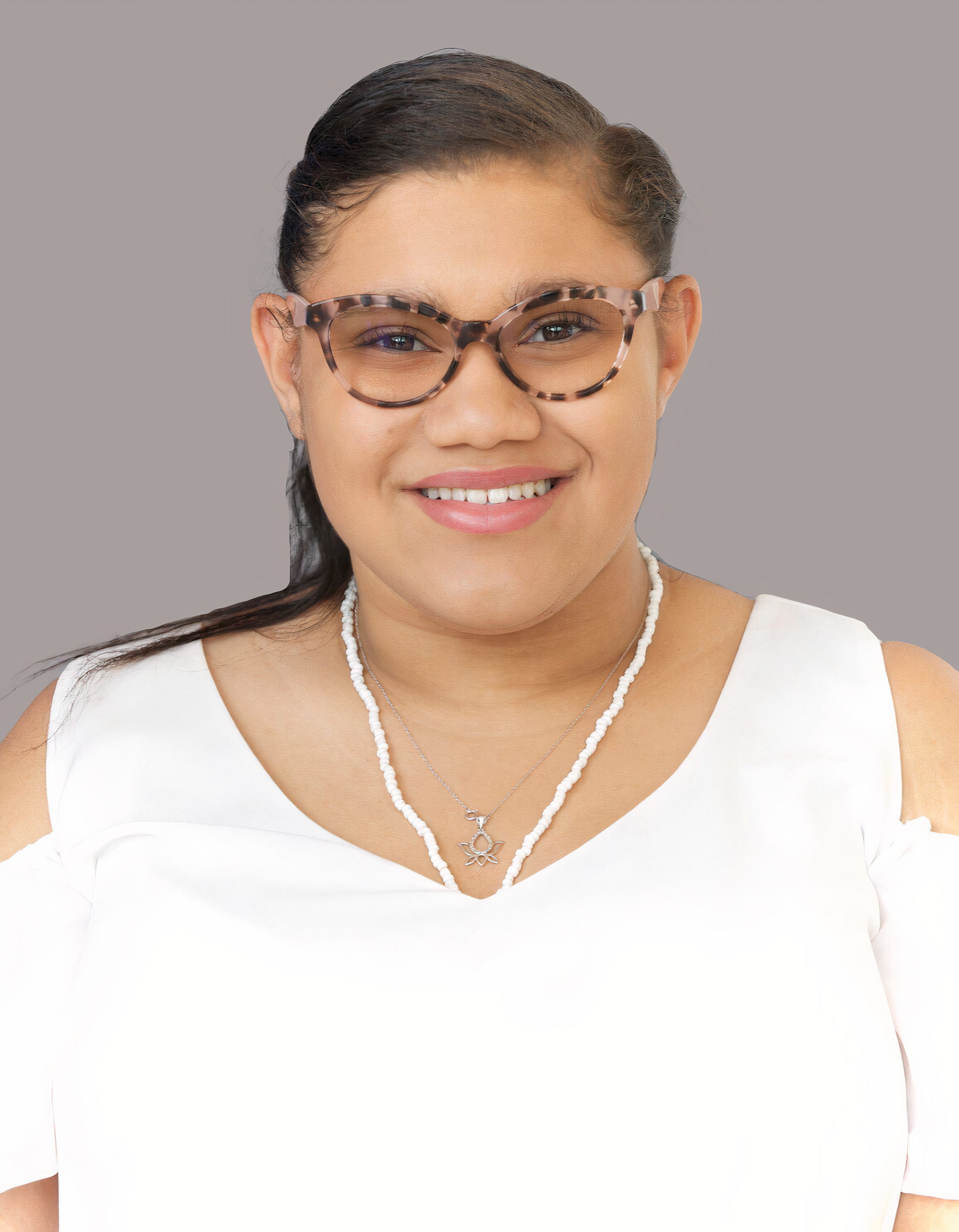
- Frias in 2019
- Born: January 13, 1998 (age 28); West Harlem, New York
- Education: State University of New York at Oswego
- Organization(s): March For Our Lives; Future Coalition; Box The Ballot
- Known for: Activism

Daphne Frias (born January 13, 1998) is an American activist from West Harlem, New York City, whose work and advocacy has focused on gun control, voting rights, climate change, environmental and disability justice.

== Early life and education ==
Frias was born premature at 27 weeks in West Harlem on January 13, 1998, to parents from the Dominican Republic. She has two siblings, and the family spoke Spanish at home during her childhood. At age 3, Frias was diagnosed with cerebral palsy. Frias began her education in a New York City public school, and after fracturing her knee in third grade, divided her time between physical rehabilitation and her academic studies.

Frias attended The Beacon School during her high school years. Her time there greatly influenced her climate activism.

Frias told Vice Magazine in 2019, "There is a waste treatment plant that has been creating pollution in my community for a long time. I didn't realize that wasn't normal until I went to a predominantly affluent neighborhood and saw that they don't have that."

Frias has described her father, a military veteran, as a "hard-core Republican" and stated, "it's made me a better activist because I've had to work harder to find a middle ground." She became part of the first generation in her family to attend college.

During college at the State University of New York at Oswego, she double majored in biology and anthropology and minored in sociology and creating writing. In early 2020, she was accepted into a joint M.D. and M.P.H. degree program in Maryland.

== Activism ==
Frias speaks at a Gays Against Guns rally for El Paso and Dayton in 2019

Frias began her career in activism after the 2018 Stoneman Douglas High School shooting in Parkland, Florida. While a student at State University of New York at Oswego, Frias became active in organizing efforts to support the gun control advocacy organization March for Our Lives as well as accessible transportation for students to attend the March For Our Lives protest, and was appointed the New York State Director for the organization in August 2018.

In 2018, before the midterm elections, Frias founded the nonprofit organization Box The Ballot to help collect and deliver absentee ballots. By working with college students, the organization collected almost 470,000 absentee ballots. In 2018, Frias also became the lead organizer in New York for Future Coalition, a youth-led voting rights organization, during the Walkout to Vote campaign that encouraged high school students to leave school to vote. As the lead organizer, she coordinated with high school organizers, the local March on the Polls chapter and Gays Against Guns for a Union Square rally and march on election day, when public schools were closed across New York City. She told CNBC before the rally, "Most of us are coming of age in a time of a political sensory overload, but that does not stop us from realizing that we are unhappy with the way our country is going. We've marched and we've rallied and that made people listen."

In July 2019, Frias participated in the 2019 Youth Climate Summit in Miami organized by the youth-led climate justice organization Zero Hour. She was also an official spokesperson at the September 2019 Climate Strike protest in New York City, which was part of coordinated international protests also known as the Global Week for Future.

At age 21, Frias was elected as the West Harlem county committee representative for the Democratic party in New York, and then worked with her staff as a liaison between community members and elected officials. At age 22, in March 2020, Frias contracted COVID-19 and pneumonia. She used social media to share updates about her progress, and told NBC News, "I think me being sick made it a lot more personal for people, and I think that's what people are needing right now, a tangible person to connect to." She later told The Washington Post that the pandemic seemed to shift attention from politics to daily challenges for people, and expressed hope that the shift in focus would continue.

In 2021, while a medical school student, Frias attended COP26 as a speaker for The New York Times Generation Climate Initiative. During the conference, she participated in discussion forums organized by The New York Times about leadership. She told The New York Times, "We always say our leaders have failed us. We are the new leaders. We are the ones who are going to make the decisions going forward."

Climate activism and disability justice

Frias's climate activism has focused on the relationship between climate change and disability justice. In a 2022 article in "Stanford Social Innovation Review'', co-written with disability policy researcher Valerie Novack, Frias described climate change as a disability justice issue and argued that people with disabilities are frequently excluded from climate and environmental justice discussions. They discussed the increased risks that disabled people can face during extreme heat, flooding, natural disasters, and other climate-related events, particularly where emergency planning and public services are not accessible. Frias also argued for greater participation by people with disabilities in the development of climate policies and solutions.

Environmental racism and public health

Frias’s position on environmental racism is that environmental conditions are closely connected to race, socioeconomic status, and public health. She views global warming and its effects through a public health lens. In her discussion with Valerie Novack in Stanford Social Innovation Review, Frias draws on her experience growing up in West Harlem, a predominantly Black, Latino, and immigrant community. She described differences between the environmental conditions in her predominantly Black, Latino, immigrant neighborhood and those in the predominantly white institutions she attended. She identified the concentration of transportation and other infrastructure in her neighborhood as part of the environmental conditions that shaped her understanding of environmental inequality. Frias has consequently discussed climate change not only as an environmental issue but also as a social and public health issue affecting communities differently according to race, income, location, and disability.

=== Leadership and recognition ===
Frias is the founder and executive director of Box The Ballot, a youth civic engagement organization. During the 2020 U.S. election cycle, the organization mobilized young people to participate in absentee voting efforts and reported collecting more than 20,000 absentee ballots during the midterm elections. In 2021, her efforts with Box The Ballot were recognized when she was honored with the 'Agente De Cambio' (Agent of Change) title at Univision Networks' Premios Juventud.

Frias has also held leadership roles in climate activism where she advocates for greater accessibility and participation of people with disabilities. In 2019, she served as a spokesperson for the global climate strikes. In 2023, she was the lead accessibility consultant for the March to End Fossil Fuels in New York City, which attracted more than 75,000 participants. Her role focused on incorporating accessibility considerations into the organization of the demonstration. Frias has also participated in international climate discussions. In 2024, she participated in a youth discussion with United Nations Secretary-General António Guterres during the United Nations General Assembly period.

Her work in civic engagement and social impact has also received recognition from business and media organizations. Frias has used personal experience and public storytelling to communicate issues related to climate change, disability, environmental inequality, and public health. In 2025, Forbes included Frias in its 30 Under 30 North America list in the Social Impact category. In the same year, TIME included her among its Latino Leaders of 2025, highlighting her work connecting climate change, disability justice, and public health (Shah, 2025).

=== Personal life ===
Frias has cerebral palsy and uses a wheelchair to ambulate.

In August 2022, Frias announced that she has been diagnosed with stage four Hodgkin lymphoma.
