= Berlioz (disambiguation) =

Hector Berlioz (1803–1869) was a French Romantic composer.

Berlioz may also refer to:

- Berlioz (surname)
- Berlioz (musician), South African jazz house musician
- Berlioz Point, a headland of Antarctica
- 69288 Berlioz, an asteroid
- MS Berlioz, a ship owned by Eurotunnel operated by MyFerryLink
- Berlioz, film character from The Aristocats
