= Young Women's Leadership School of East Harlem =

Public school in New York City

The Young Women's Leadership School

Location
- 140 West 102nd St; Manhattan, New York City, New York 10025; United States; 40°47′34″N 73°56′8″W

Information
- Established: 1996; 30 years ago
- School district: New York City Geographic District #4
- Authority: NYC Dept. of Education
- Principal: Colleen McGeehan
- Teaching staff: 31.01 (FTE) (2018–19)
- Grades: 6–12
- Enrollment: 479 (2018–19)
- Student to teacher ratio: 15.45:1 (2018–19)
- Website: tywls.org

The Young Women's Leadership School ('TYWLS) is a public all-girls school in West Harlem, Manhattan, New York City. The school serves approximately 440 young women in 6th through 12th grade. It is part of the Young Women's Leadership Network (YWLN). It was founded in 1996 by Ann and Andrew Tisch and New York City's Center for Education Innovation Public Education Association. They believed that it would help school families because in other public schools many girls weren't heard and the graduation rates were low. Then-Chancellor Rudy Crew led the project to the unanimous support of the New York City Board of Education.

== History ==
A key mission about The Young Women's Leadership of East Harlem (TYWLS) is care about the social and emotional development of the female student population. Girls said that attending a single-sex school helps with their confidence. Without boys around, some said, there is less drama and peer pressure. While the American Civil Liberties Union prepared to sue, it couldn't find a boy who wanted to attend it. Spanish is the only foreign language that is taught; all students take art and music. Students can take Advanced Placement courses in U.S. government, U.S. history, Spanish Language, Spanish literature and English. Preparation for the SATs is built into the 11th-grade English curriculum. Few electives are offered. Students get enrichment in clubs such as dance and model U.N., and internships at advertising and law firms as well as corporations such as IBM and The Food Network. An afterschool film class is offered at NEP Metropolis Studios, located in the same building. The Young Women's Leadership Network also sponsors overseas trips and a summer camp. TYWLS fields a PSAL indoor track team and intramural teams in volleyball and running.

Established in 1996, the school serves approximately 440 young women in 6th through 12th grade. It is part of the Young Women's Leadership Network (YWLN). The school, located in East Harlem, was between Community School District 4 and the Manhattan High School division. It is now located in Region 9, which is recognized as among the top 10 districts in the New York City public high schools.
