= Durry =

Durry may refer to:

- Dhurrie, a type of flat-woven rug in India and Pakistan, also spelt durry
- Durry (band), a Minnesota indie rock band formed in 2020

== See also ==
- Durrie Station, a pastoral lease in Queensland, Australia.
