= Future Coalition =

American political nonprofit organization

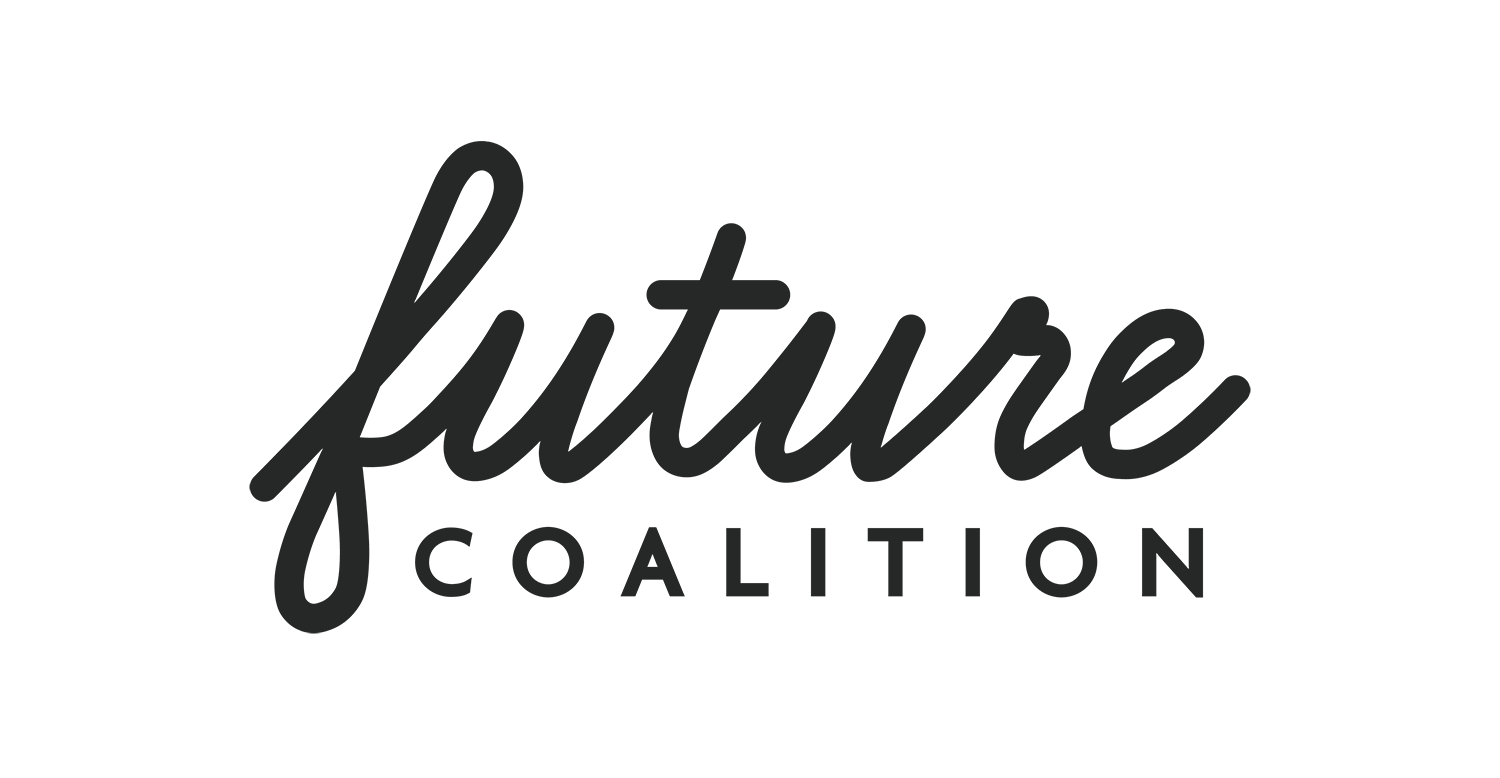
- Formation: June 2018
- Type: Political non-profit group
- Executive Director: Corryn Grace Freeman
- Website: FutureCoalition.org

Future Coalition is a coalition of youth-led activist organizations focused on social change. It was co-founded by two of the main organizations that grew out of the response to the shootings in Parkland, FL: 50 Miles More and National School Walkout. The Future Coalition has been incubated by March On, the coalition of Women's Marches, as their “youth arm.”

The coalition consists of youth-led activist organizations focused on issues such as gun violence prevention, climate change, and social and racial justice. They include: 18by Vote, National Youth Rights Association, Bridge the Divide, Sunrise Movement, Box the Ballot, Students for Gun Legislation, Chicago Fuerte, Coalition of Students, DC Teens Action, Embracing Green, Global Minds, Indivisible Students, iMatter, March For Our Lives National, Moco4Change, March for Our Lives, National Die In, National School Walkout, Orange Generation, Parents Promise to Kids, Platform, Redefy, Shattering the Silence, Student Voice, Team Enough, Triangle People Power, Youth Empower, Zero Hour, and 50 Miles More.

Activist and social entrepreneur Katie Eder (founder of 50 Miles More) founded the organization and currently serves as the Board Chair. Corryn Grace Freeman, a Florida-based social activist, joined as the organization's Executive Director in May 2023.

== Campaigns ==
=== Walkout to Vote ===
In September 2018, Future Coalition launched the #WalkoutToVote, a campaign with the goal of getting every eligible young person to vote in the 2018 midterm elections by encouraging them to walk out of their classrooms on election day and march to the polls to cast their ballots. Over 500 individual student-led walkouts took place in schools across the country. The campaign was supported on social media by Hillary Clinton, Snoop Dogg, Piper Perabo, Sarah Silverman, Bobby Umar, Debra Messing, Jane Lynch, Jon Cooper, Eric Swalwell, and HJ Benjamin and was credited with influencing high voter turnout among young people in the 2018 midterms.

=== September 20 Climate Strike ===
Future Coalition was involved in helping organize the September 20 Climate Strike, an international strike and protest led by young people and adults held three days before the UN Climate Summit in NYC on September 20 across the US and world to demand action be taken to address the climate crisis. The event was a part of the school strike for climate movement.

=== Earth Day Live ===
Future Coalition organized Earth Day Live, a three-day livestream commemorating the 50th anniversary of Earth Day in the United States. The event was streamed online as part of efforts to promote social distancing during the COVID-19 pandemic. It is being referred to as the largest online mass mobilization in history.

=== Vote With Us ===
Future Coalition coordinated the Vote With Us campaign to promote early voting in the 2020 United States presidential election. The campaign featured in-person events across the country and a virtual rally featuring notable celebrities and voting activists.

=== March On for Voting Rights ===
Future Coalition and other notable civic organizations coordinated March On For Voting Rights is a mass mobilization on August 28, the 58th anniversary of Martin Luther King Jr.'s historic March on Washington organized by March On and other notable civil rights leaders in response to Senate Republicans blocking the For The People Act.
