= The Beacon School =

Public school in New York City

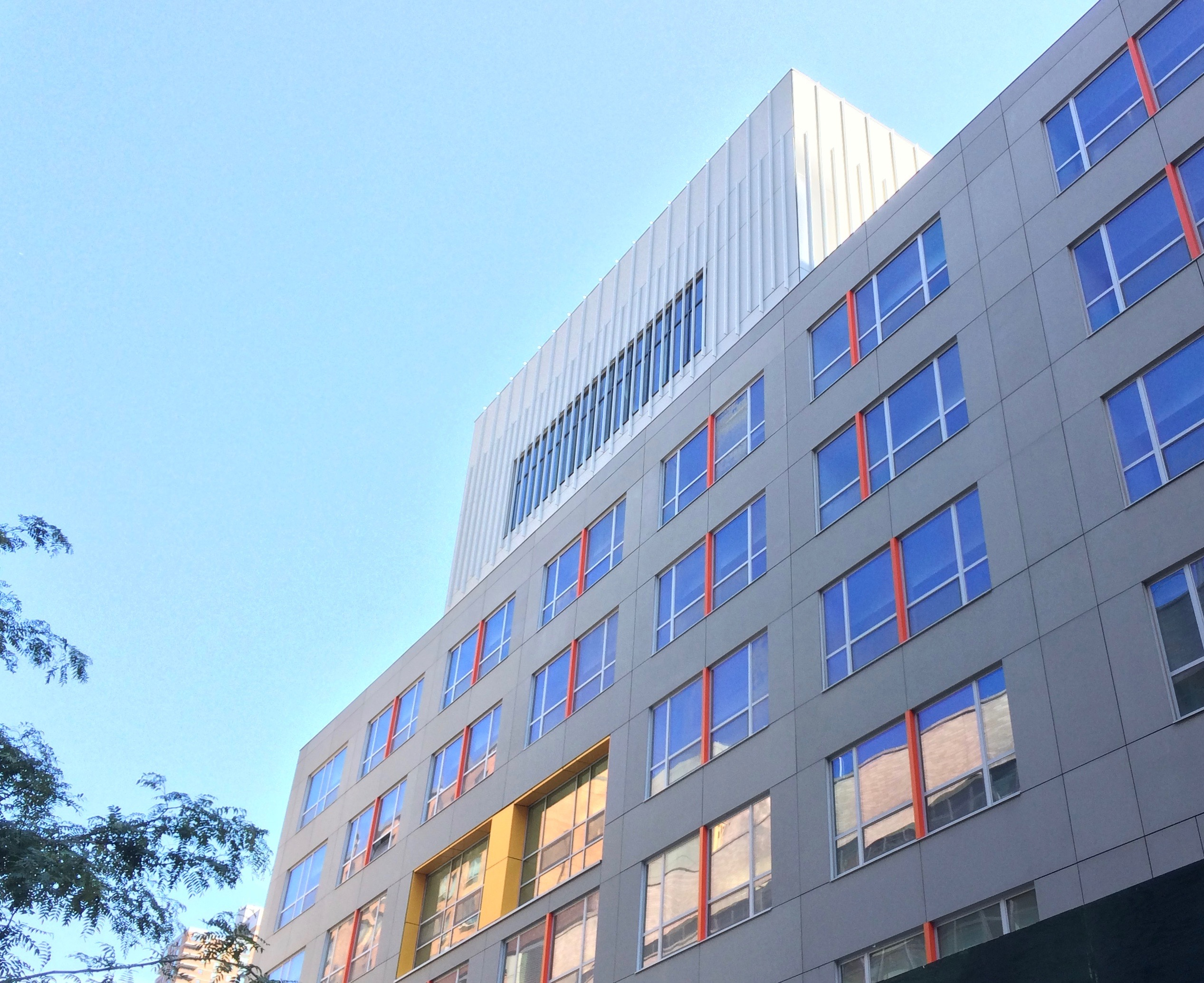

Location
- 522 West 44th Street; New York, New York 10036; United States; 40°45′41″N 73°59′46″W

Information
- Type: Selective public high school
- Established: 1993; 33 years ago
- School district: New York City Department of Education
- NCES School ID: 360007800592
- Principal: Jeannie Ferrari
- Faculty: 65 (on FTE basis)
- Grades: 9 to 12
- Enrollment: 1,585
- Colors: Blue and white
- Athletics: Baseball, basketball, bowling, cross country, fencing, indoor track, outdoor track, softball, ultimate frisbee, volleyball, wrestling, soccer
- Athletics conference: PSAL
- Nickname: Blue Demons
- Newspaper: The Beacon Beat
- Website: www.beaconschool.org

The Beacon School (also called Beacon High School) is a college-preparatory public high school in the Hell's Kitchen area of Manhattan in New York City. Students present performance-based projects (performance-based assessments, PBAs) at the end of each semester to panels of teachers. In 2019, the school received roughly 6,000 applications for 360 ninth-grade seats, yielding an acceptance rate of approximately 6.2%. In 2026, Beacon was ranked the #6 and #20 top public school in NYC and New York state respectively by US News.

== Founding and mission ==
Beacon was founded in 1993 by District Three educators Ruth Lacey and Stephen Stoll as a new high school in the district (at the time, the only District Three high school was Martin Luther King Jr. High School).

Lacey and Stoll "envisioned an interdisciplinary high school small enough to allow teachers to act as advisers to groups of kids, with an emphasis on computers and the arts;" further emphasising community service, open-mindedness, and new ways of teaching. The curriculum represented an alternative to the Regents Exam-based testing system in favor of portfolio-based assessment. The school's purpose was also purportedly to keep class sizes down and total student population at, or just above, one thousand students. The school started in 1993 with 100 students, initially gaining 100 new students each year.

Over time, Beacon was forced to accept certain aspects of the Regents-based testing curriculum and to abandon its portfolio-assessment system as the sole method of graduation, which had been the case until mid-1999. Beacon now utilizes traditional testing, but "[t]o graduate from Beacon, students must present and defend selected projects each year."

== Academics ==
=== Overview ===
The class schedule at the Beacon School is organized in bands, designated by letters A through H. As a Beacon student advances in grade level, they are gradually given more opportunities to choose classes of their choice in the subject area of the band in question, rather than relying on their stream to do the selecting. This is both a preparatory measure for the university system of class selection, where students are permitted to select all their classes themselves on an individual basis, as well as a means of allowing students the ability to find what interests them among the course offerings.

Instead of offering a large number of Advanced Placement (AP) courses, "Beacon offers rigorous semester-long, college preparatory courses for seniors. Extensive research, critical analysis, and writing are required components of the courses." Examples of such offerings include courses like:

- NYC In Crisis: The Fiscal Crisis of 1975 and Today
- International Political Economy
- Understanding China (20th-century revolutionary history; current events; Sino-American relationship)
- The System (an examination of how we evaluate, construct and change legal and governmental systems, through the study of the idea of justice, our criminal and civil legal systems, and the legislative and administrative process)
- Constitutional Law
- Responding to the Climate Crisis
- Food Writing
- Existentialism
- Journalism
- French Culture & History

Nonetheless, Beacon offers a selection of AP courses. As former principal Brady Smith explained,

[W]hile we might philosophically be opposed to AP exams — I personally am opposed to that kind of high-demand testing as an educator and parent — I think a lot of our community members still believe that AP is important, and that it carries cachet with colleges especially with the benefit of credit. It’s pretty hard to deny so many people — we had 350 people sit for AP science exams last year — who would otherwise be wondering why they can't take APs at Beacon. We’re struggling with the balance between demand and policy.

AP courses are currently available at Beacon for biology, calculus, physics, French, and Spanish. Students take the Advanced Placement exam at the end of the course and have an opportunity to attain college credits.

=== In-school requirements ===
Though the yearly schedule is broken into two semesters, these are not standard United States college semesters. Most academic classes are year-long courses, so students generally return to their classes with the same teachers for the second semester. Students have the opportunity to change electives at the end of each semester. Certain science courses are offered to students on a per-semester basis.

=== Internships and community service ===
The school does not require its students to do internships, but internship opportunities are available for those who want to pursue them. A minimum of 50 hours of community service hours is a strictly enforced graduation requirement and can be fulfilled however a student likes, as long as they clear the work with a community service leader in writing before beginning it. The community service program is led by a faculty advisor who informs sophomores about community service placements across the city at nonprofits such as the Added Value Farm in Red Hook, Brooklyn, and Community Voices Heard in East Harlem.

Beacon states:

Beacon students, in their sophomore year, make a commitment to volunteer 50 hours with a single organization. The experience is supported by a curriculum taught through our advisories that asks students to discuss questions of social justice in our broader New York City community and to reflect on what they learn through their service. Volunteer experiences introduce students to new aspects of life in the city, offer them opportunities to take on new responsibilities, provide them with an introduction to adult workplaces, and make connections between what they learn in the classroom and the world around them.

== Campus ==
=== 1993 to 2015 ===
Initially, the school was co-located with a Manhattan elementary school, "but the students were crushed into corners and hallways." For the next two years, the Beacon School was located inside Fordham University's Lincoln Center Campus at 113 West 60th Street. It also utilized John Jay College of Criminal Justice's facilities for physical education.

From 1995 to 2015, the school was located three blocks from John Jay, at 227 West 61st Street, a former warehouse completed in 1919, alongside the Amsterdam Houses, a group of New York City Housing Authority projects. It was in an area with many other schools, including Public School 191 and Abraham Joshua Heschel School across the street.

The former Beacon School location is now occupied by West End Secondary School.

=== 2015 to present ===
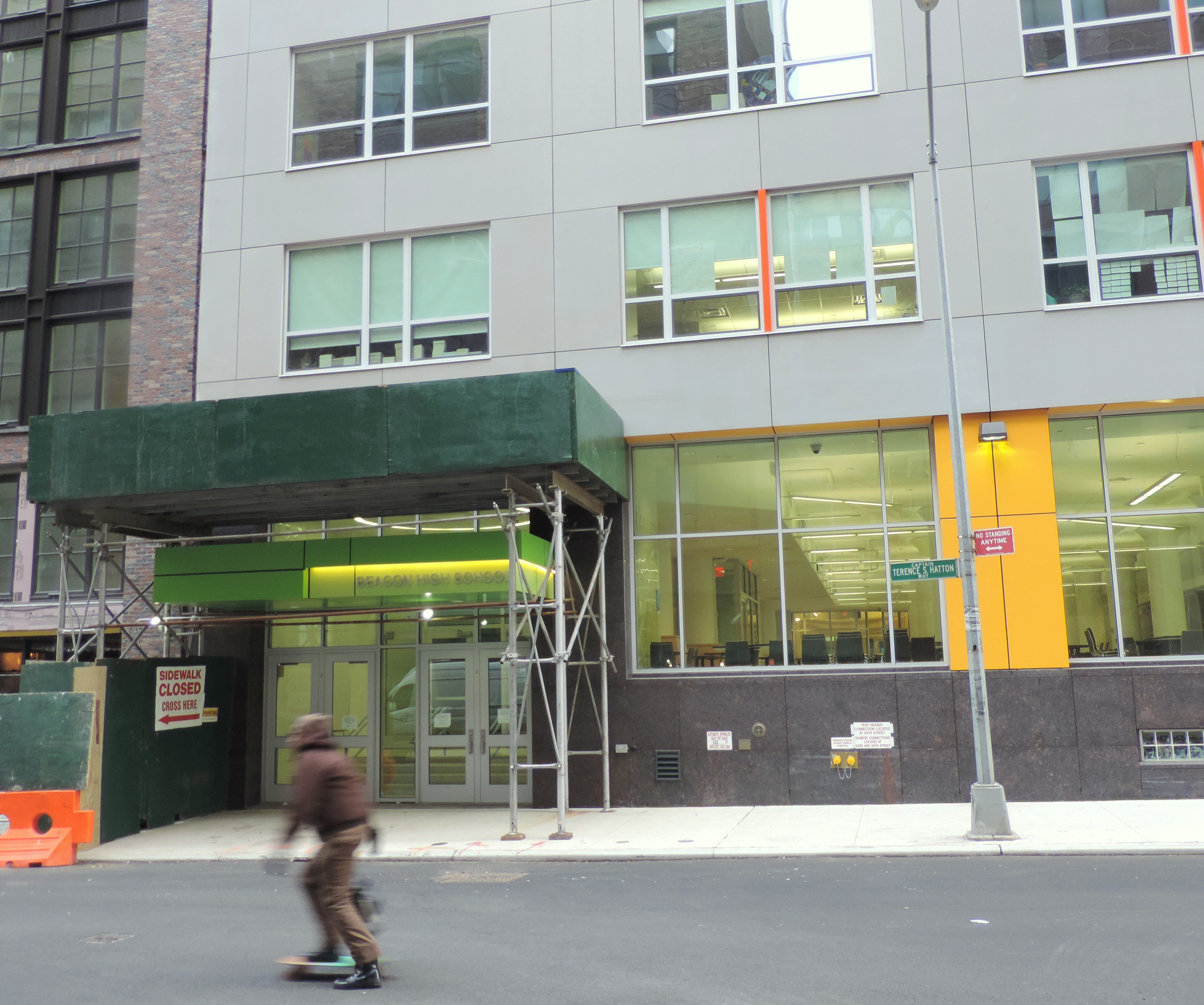
The school's 43rd Street entrance

As of September, 2015, Beacon occupies a seven-story building located at 522 West 44th Street, between 10th and 11th avenues. The building, previously used as a book warehouse by the New York Public Library, was sold to the School Construction Authority for $45 million in August, 2011. Construction began in August, 2012, with a groundbreaking ceremony attended by high-ranking city officials including City Council Speaker Christine Quinn, Department of Education Chancellor Dennis Walcott, and Mayor Michael Bloomberg.

The building, built by Skanska USA for $88 million, houses a full-sized cafeteria, black-box theater, dance studio, auditorium, film lab, and library, with writing labs, art studios, and study spaces throughout the building.

== Culture ==
The Beacon School offers extracurricular activities such as a hiking club, an after-school theater and studio stage crew, book club, a rock climbing club, a dance club, a Live Poets Society, entrepreneurship club, art club, music performance, a photo club, an architecture club, a senior committee (populated by seniors who are responsible for helping with plans for graduation and the annual senior trip), a Model United Nations club, and a debate team. The school also has social justice clubs and affinity groups, such as Black Student Union, Muslim Student Union, Asian Student Union, Integrate Beacon and Young Democratic Socialists. Charity clubs include Project ABLE, which raises money for libraries in Africa, and the Kids for Kids Club, which raises money for local and nonlocal causes.

Beacon has had a student government since 2016, with members representing the student voice in the school leadership team.

Educational travel has become an important part of the educational culture. Past destinations included India, Cuba, Spain, England, Ireland, Venezuela, France, Japan, Sweden, Costa Rica, Mexico, Mozambique, South Africa, and New Orleans.

In 2007, the New York Post reported that the school had taken students on illegal field trips to Cuba. (In 2005, then-Lieutenant Governor David Paterson sent his daughter on one such trip.) At the end of the school year the teacher involved, Nathan Turner, resigned. Alumni reaction to the trips was mixed, with some former students continuing to be involved in activism, while others expressed frustration with the liberal leanings of their teachers and peers.

== Athletics ==
The Beacon School offers an array of athletic teams for its students. Sports including fencing, softball, track, wrestling, bowling, basketball, Ultimate, soccer, cross country, and tennis form a part of the culture at Beacon.

In 2014, Beacon's tennis team won the national tennis championship as a result of taking first place at the All-American Invitational Boys Tennis Tournament in Corona del Mar, California. Because the school does not have a practice space of its own, the school uses many of the city's public access facilities. In addition, the boys' baseball team advanced to the 2019 Public School Athletic League (PSAL) AAA championship game. The game was played in Yankee Stadium on June 4, and the Beacon School lost to Gregorio Luperon HS for Science and Math with a final score of four to five.

On November 7, 2019, both the boys' and girls' soccer programs became city champions by defeating John Adams High School and Brooklyn Tech, respectively. The games were played at Belson Stadium on the campus of St. John's University in Queens. As a result, the Beacon boys' soccer team was ranked #9 in New York State, and has since remained one of the strongest programs in New York City.

In 2025, the Beacon Boys' Fencing team claimed first place in the PSAL championship. In 2026, the Beacon Girls' Softball team secured the championship with a 7-6 walk-off victory over Louis Brandeis.

== Model United Nations ==
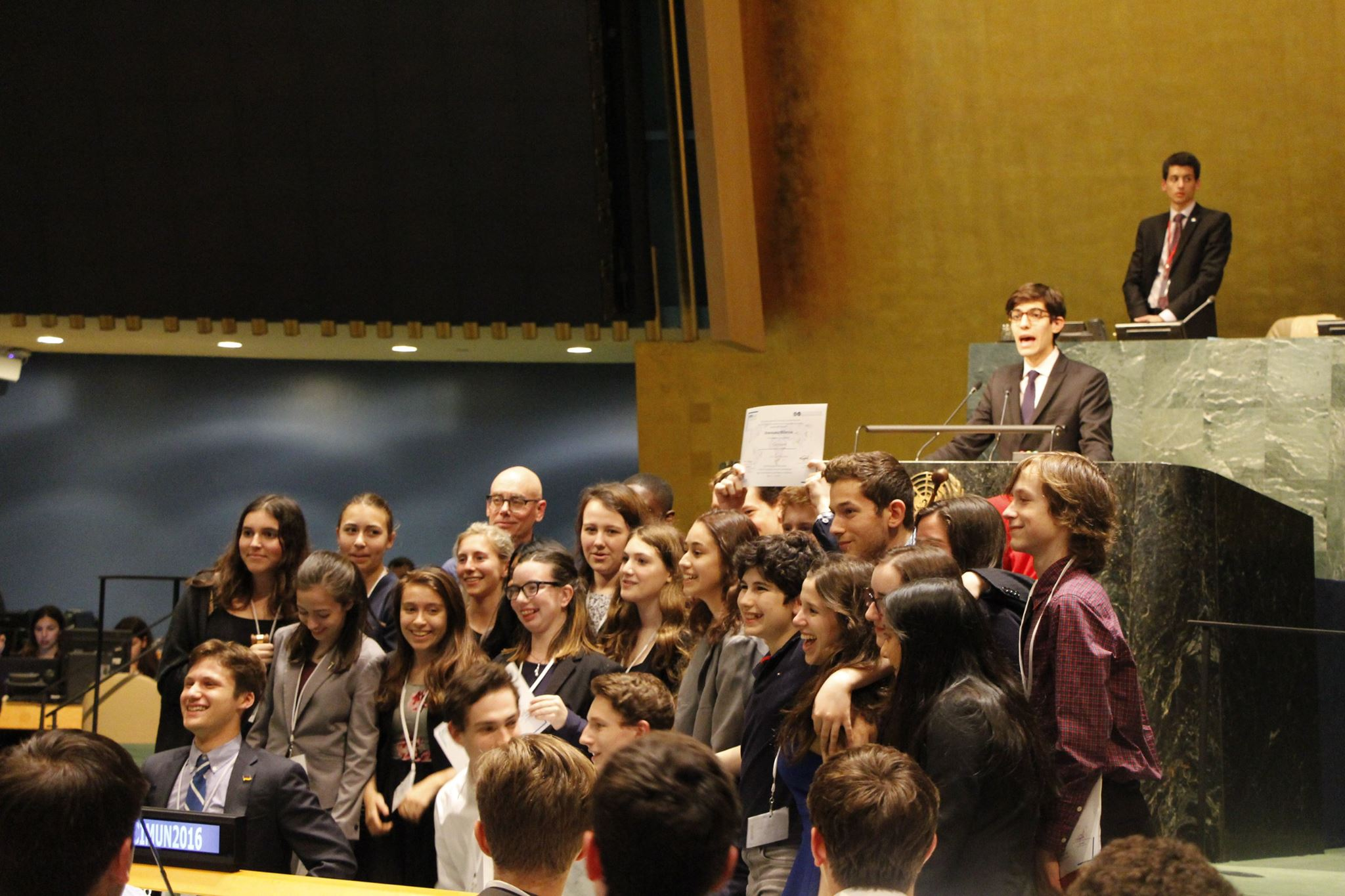
Beacon's Model UN team accepts the Best Delegation Award at GCIMUN 2016 in the General Assembly Hall at the UN Headquarters, New York City.

Beacon's Model United Nations debates solutions to international issues, and attends conferences within New York City, as well as throughout the United States.

In 2016, Beacon's delegation placed first among 174 schools from over 30 countries in the Global Classrooms Model United Nations conference. The conference, held annually at United Nations Headquarters, is sponsored by the United Nations Association of the United States in collaboration with the Lebanese American University.

Since 2016, Beacon's Model United Nations program has been cited at the top of Best Delegate's annual list of the world's best high school Model UN teams. The rankings, calculated based on data aggregated from the 30 most competitive Model UN conferences in North America, divide teams into groups by region and overall standing. Beacon is ranked in the Top 25 Overall category, the highest level of recognition awarded by the publication.

== Transportation ==
The New York City Subway's Times Square–42nd Street and 42nd Street–Port Authority Bus Terminal stations, served by the 1, 2, 3, 7, <7>, A, C, E, N, Q, R, W, and S trains, are located nearby. New York City Bus's M42, M12, M11 routes also stop near Beacon. Students residing a certain distance from the school are provided full-fare or half-fare student MetroCards for public transportation at the start of each term, based on the distance the student resides from the school.

== Student demographics ==
As of 2025, student demographics were as follows: 34.4% White, 27.7% Hispanic, 13.5% Black, and 12.3% Asian, 10.6% two or more races. Approximately 64 out of 100 students were female. Students commute from all boroughs of New York City, but most reside in Manhattan and Brooklyn.

After the school experienced a significant decline in the number of Black and Hispanic students since its founding due to changes in the admissions policy, in 2020 the school rededicated itself to diversity, even relaxing some of its previous admission standards. Although the proportion of minorities increased, many parents felt the quality of the school's education — particularly support for students with special needs — had suffered.

== Principals ==
- 1993–c. 2005 Stephen Stoll
- c. 2006–Aug. 2020 Ruth Lacey
- Aug. 2020–August 2023 Brady Smith
- Aug. 2023–Jan. 2025 Johnny Ventura (acting interim)
- Jan. 2025–present Jeannie Ferrari

== Notable alumni ==
- Elizabeth Acevedo, poet, novelist
- Xiye Bastida, climate activist
- Hannah Berner, comedian
- Nina Bloomgarden, actor
- Marlon Craft, rapper
- Daphne Frias, climate, disability and gun violence activist
- Hannah Hodson, actor and writer
- Morris Katz, political strategist
- Laundry Day, pop rock band formed in 2018
- Quarters of Change, rock band formed in 2017

== See also ==
- Education in New York City
- List of high schools in New York City
- Public Schools Athletic League
- Gifted education
