= Earth Day Live =

Celebratory livestream for 50th Earth Day anniversary

- Duration: April 22, 2020 to April 24, 2020
- Type: Livestream
- Theme: Climate Change Activism
- Cause: Earth Day 50th Anniversary and the COVID-19 pandemic
- Organized by: Future Coalition
- Website: earthdaylive2020.org

Earth Day Live was a three-day livestream commemorating the 50th anniversary of Earth Day in the United States. The event was streamed online as part of efforts to promote social distancing during the COVID-19 pandemic. It is being referred to as the largest online mass mobilization in history.
