= Katie Eder =

American activist

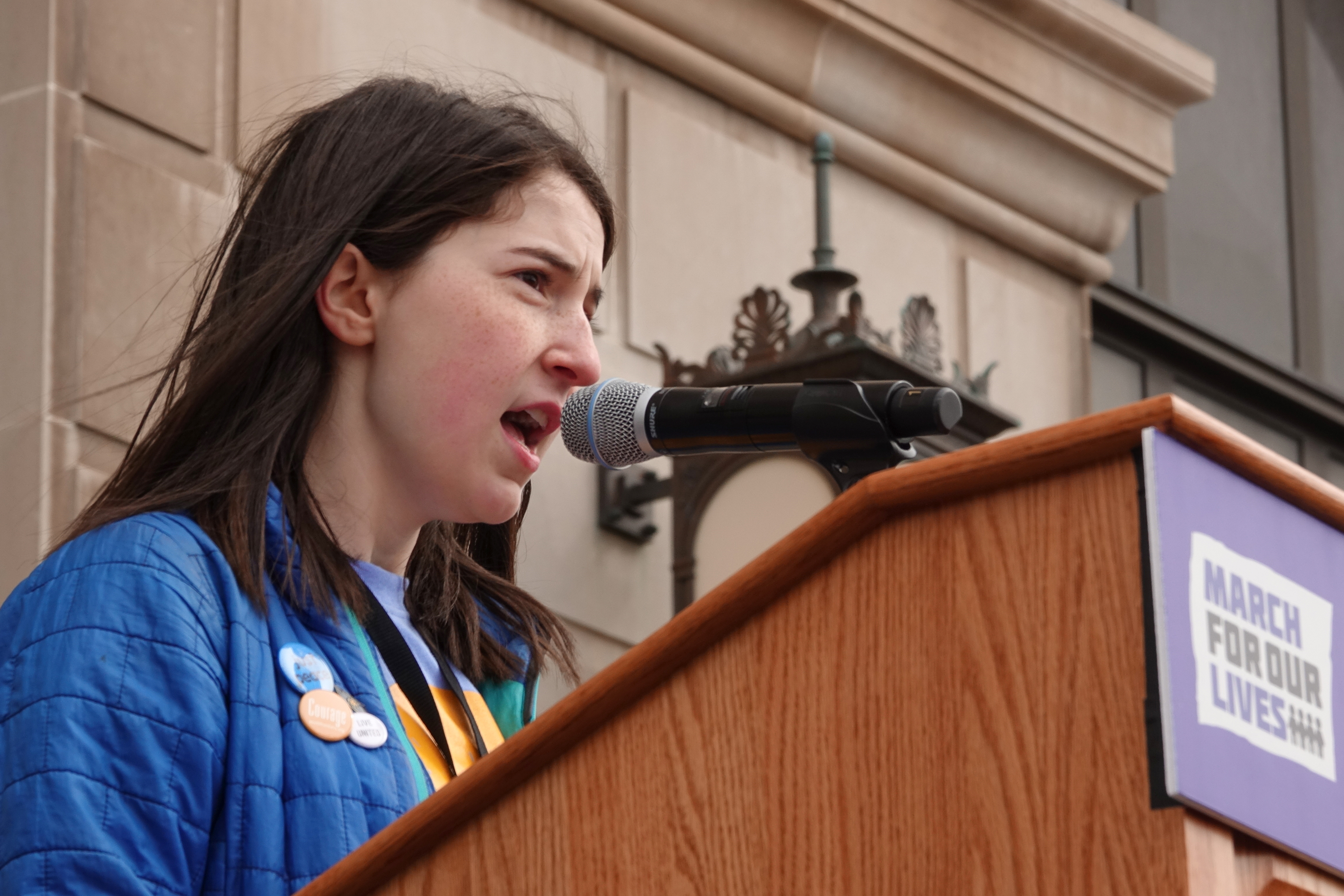
- Born: c. 1999 or 2000 (age 26–27); Milwaukee, Wisconsin, U.S.
- Education: Shorewood High School (2018); Stanford University (2020–)
- Known for: Founder of 50 Miles More, Future Coalition

Katie Eder (born c. 1999) is an American climate and social justice organizer. Katie co-founded the Future Coalition in 2018, and served as the organization's Executive Director for the first four years of its operations. In that role, Katie coordinated the 2019 and 2020 US Climate Strike Coalition.

Katie Eder is currently finishing up her undergraduate degree in American Studies at Stanford University with a concentration in transforming the American Political System.

In December 2019, Eder was named one of Forbes 30 under 30 in Law and Policy.

== Early life and education ==
Eder was born and raised in Milwaukee, Wisconsin. Katie graduated from Shorewood High School in 2018 and started at Stanford University in the fall of 2020. She is the youngest of five children.

== Activism ==
=== Future Coalition ===
When she was 18 years old, Katie Eder co-founded Future Coalition, a network of youth-led organizations and youth activists across the United States. Future Coalition works collaboratively to provide young people with the resources, tools, and support they need to create change in their communities.

Katie led the building and implementation of Future Coalition. Most notably, Katie oversaw Future Coalition's role in coordinating the US Climate Strike Coalition, the group of over 200 organizations who planned the 2019 and 2020 Climate Strikes in the US, including the September 20, 2019 Climate Strike which turned out nearly one million people across the US and over seven million people worldwide.

Katie actively supported the US v. Juliana Case, the 19 young people who sued the US government for violating their rights by failing to act on Climate Change.

In 2021 and 2022, Katie supported the creation of the Youth Climate Finance Alliance, a now independent group, working to pressure finance institutions to stop funding and insuring fossil fuel operations.

Future Coalition has also mobilized young people to vote, contributing to the record breaking turnouts in 2018, 2020, and 2022.

In 2022 and 2023, Katie served as the Future Coalition's Strategy Director. She is currently serving as the President of the board of directors.

=== 50 Miles More ===
After the 2018 March For Our Lives events ended on March 24, Katie and other students from her high school organized a 50-mile march from Madison, WI to Janesville, WI, the hometown of former U.S. Speaker of the House Paul Ryan, to call him out for his role in blocking and burying gun legislation. This 50 Miles More march lead Katie and her team to launch a nationwide campaign called #50more in #50states to challenge the other 49 states to hold 50 Mile Marches to the hometown or office of one of their NRA-backed elected officials to demand they take action to end gun violence. 50 Miles More did 50 mile walk in Massachusetts in August 2018. 50 Miles More also innovated a nationwide youth-led voter engagement initiative targeting these newly engaged marchers to get them to the polls to vote in the 2018 midterm elections.

=== Kids Tales ===
When Katie was 13 years old, she founded a nonprofit organization, Kids Tales, to bring creative writing workshops, taught by teens, to kids who do not have access to writing experiences outside of school. During a Kids Tales workshop, kids write a short story that is published in an anthology, a real book. Fifteen hundred kids in nine countries have participated in Kids Tales workshops. Kids Tales has engaged over 400 teen teachers and published 90 anthologies.

=== Early Activism ===
Katie got her start in activism in the fourth grade when she organized a sit-in during gym class to protest boys and girls playing separately.

== Honors and awards ==
  - Forbes 30 under 30 in Law and Policy.
  - https://www.teenvogue.com/story/teen-climate-activists-fighting-future-of-the-planet
  - Prudential Spirit of Community Award – National Honoree
  - Diller Tikkun Olam Award
  - Three Dot Dash – Global Social Entrepreneurship Incubator – Just Peace Summit
  - International Literacy Association – 30 under 30 Award
  - AFS-USA Project Change – Vision in Action Award
