= 50 Miles More =

American gun control advocacy nonprofit organization

- Formation: February 2018
- Dissolved: March 2021
- Type: Political non-profit group
- Leader: Tatiana Washington

50 Miles More was a youth-led American nonprofit organization working to end gun violence in the United States through local, grassroots action to pass gun control.

== About ==
After the March 2018 March For Our Lives, students from across Wisconsin marched 50 miles from Madison, to Janesville, the hometown of Speaker of the House Paul Ryan, to demand he support gun control legislation. North Carolina Inspired by the 54-mile Selma to Montgomery march for civil rights, the four-day march to Speaker Paul Ryan's hometown gained international attention.

50 Miles More brings together young people across schools, regions, and communities to create a bond among young activists to ensure a strong foundation for action around future gun control legislation.

=== #50more in #50states ===
After the initial march in Wisconsin, student organizers launched the #50more in #50states campaign to challenge young people in every state to hold a 50-mile march to the hometown or office of an NRA-backed elected officials. Their goal was to ensure that the momentum continued after the Wisconsin march and that the country continued to hear the voices of young people.

=== 50 Miles More Massachusetts ===
Massachusetts was the first state to take on the #50more in #50states challenge, marching 50 miles from Worcester, MA city hall to the headquarters of Smith & Wesson, one of the largest gun manufacturers in the country. 50 Miles More Massachusetts activists raised awareness of Smith & Wesson's contribution to the gun violence epidemic and called for a stop to the production of all weapons outlawed in Massachusetts.

=== The Milwaukee to Madison March ===
On June 26, 2020, amid the COVID-19 pandemic, 50 Miles More organizers announced plans to embark on "The Milwaukee to Madison March", walking 65 miles across Wisconsin, starting at City Hall in Milwaukee on June 30, 2020, and ending in Madison on Independence Day, July 4, 2020. Organizers say they are calling on Wisconsin elected officials to do more to protect Black youth, including Black women and Black LGBTQ+ youth in Wisconsin

== History ==
50 Miles More was formed at the end of February 2018, led by activist Katie Eder. After the March 14 walkouts and March For Our Lives were announced, students at Shorewood High School in Shorewood, WI sought to ensure that after these events ended the country did not stop fighting to end gun violence. The march was announced on March 12, two days before the national walkout. The march was planned by a number of students from Shorewood High School including Katie Eder, Brendan Fardella, Shannon Carlson, Hiwot Schutz, Alemitu Caldart, and Lauren Davis. The students were supported by the Shorewood School District Superintendent, Dr. Bryan Davis, parents, and community members. 50 Miles More is now led by Executive Director Tatiana Washington. 50 Miles More is a founding member of The Future Coalition.
