= Music for Cars (tour) =

2018–20 concert tour by the 1975

- World tour by The 1975
- Promotional poster
- Location: North America; South America; Europe; Asia; Oceania
- Associated album: A Brief Inquiry Into Online Relationships; Notes on a Conditional Form (planned)
- Start date: 29 November 2018
- End date: 3 March 2020 (Note: The tour was scheduled to end of 11 July 2021, but the final show was played on 3 March 2020 due to the COVID-19 pandemic.)
- Legs: 8
- No. of shows: 149 (Note: 149 shows were actually played, 167 shows were originally scheduled.)

The 1975 concert chronology
- I Like It When You Sleep (2016–2017); Music for Cars (2018–2020); At Their Very Best (2022–2023)

The Music for Cars concert tour was the third concert tour by English indie art pop band the 1975 in support of their third studio album A Brief Inquiry Into Online Relationships, released on 30 November 2018. The 24-month long world tour began on 29 November 2018 in England.

The tour was also scheduled to support their fourth studio album–and second part of the Music for Cars era–Notes on a Conditional Form, released on 22 May 2020. However, the tour prematurely ended on 3 March 2020 in the wake of the worldwide COVID-19 pandemic. Originally, the tour was scheduled to conclude on 10 July 2021 in London, England. The tour was supported with the following opening acts and special guests No Rome, Pale Waves, The Japanese House and Beabadoobee.

Several of the 2020 sets were postponed to 2021, but on 12 January 2021, the band cancelled all 2021 shows due to the COVID-19 pandemic.

== Set list ==
This set list is representative of the show on 15 February 2020 in Nottingham, England. It does not represent all dates throughout the tour.

1. "People"
2. "Sex"
3. "TOOTIMETOOTIMETOOTIME"
4. "Me & You Together Song"
5. "Sincerity Is Scary"
6. "It's Not Living (If It's Not with You)"
7. "If You're Too Shy (Let Me Know)"
8. "Love Me"
9. "I Couldn't Be More in Love"
10. "Guys"
11. "Robbers"
12. "Fallingforyou"
13. "Milk"
14. "Lostmyhead"
15. "Frail State of Mind"
16. "I Like America & America Likes Me"
17. "Somebody Else"
18. "I Always Wanna Die (Sometimes)"
19. "Love It If We Made It"
20. "Paris"
21. "Chocolate"
22. "Give Yourself a Try"
23. "The Sound"

== Tour dates ==
List of concerts, showing date, city, country, venue, and opening act
Date	City	Country	Venue	Opening act	Notes	Ref.
Warm-up shows						
29 November 2018	Kingston	England	Pryzm	Pale Waves		
30 November 2018	Kingston	England	Pryzm	Pale Waves		
4 December 2018	Camden	England	The Barfly	Pale Waves		
UK & Ireland						
9 January 2019	Belfast	Northern Ireland	Odyssey Complex	Pale Waves; No Rome		
10 January 2019	Dublin	Ireland	3Arena	Pale Waves; No Rome		
12 January 2019	Glasgow	Scotland	SSE Hydro	Pale Waves; No Rome		
14 January 2019	Cardiff	Wales	Motorpoint Arena	Pale Waves; No Rome		
16 January 2019	Brighton	England	Brighton Centre	Pale Waves; No Rome		
18 January 2019	London	England	The O_{2} Arena	Pale Waves; No Rome		
19 January 2019	London	England	The O_{2} Arena	Pale Waves; No Rome		
21 January 2019	Exeter	England	Westpoint Arena	Pale Waves; No Rome		
23 January 2019	Birmingham	England	Arena Birmingham	Pale Waves; No Rome		
24 January 2019	Manchester	England	Manchester Arena	Pale Waves; No Rome		
25 January 2019	Sheffield	England	FlyDSA Arena	Pale Waves; No Rome		
Latin America						
17 March 2019 (Note: The concert on 17 March 2019 at Foro Sol in Mexico is part of Vive Latino.)	Mexico City	Foro Sol	Mexico			
20 March 2019	Zapopan	Telmex Auditorium	Mexico			
22 March 2019 (Note: The concert on 22 March 2019 at Parque Fundidora in Monterrey is part of Pal Norte.)	Monterrey	Parque Fundidora	Mexico	—N/a		
25 March 2019	Lima	Peru	Domos Art	—N/a		
28 March 2019 (Note: The concert on 28 March 2019 at Espacio Idesa in Asunción is part of Asunciónico.)	Asunción	Paraguay	Espacio Idesa	—N/a		
30 March 2019 (Note: The concert on 30 March 2019 at Hipódromo de San Isidro in Buenos Aires is part of Lollapalooza Argentina.)	Buenos Aires	Argentina	Hipódromo de San Isidro	—N/a		
31 March 2019 (Note: The concert on 31 March 2019 at Parque O'Higgins in Santiago is part of Lollapalooza Chile.)	Santiago	Chile	Parque O'Higgins	—N/a		
4 April 2019	Rio de Janeiro	Brazil	Circo Voador	—N/a		
5 April 2019 (Note: The concert on 5 April 2019 at Autódromo José Carlos Pace in São Paulo is part of Lollapalooza Brazil.)	São Paulo	Brazil	Autódromo José Carlos Pace	—N/a		
7 April 2019 (Note: The concert on 7 April 2019 at Campo de Golf Briceño 18 in Bogotá is part of Estéreo Picnic Festival.)	Bogotá	Colombia	Campo de Golf Briceño 18	—N/a		
North America						
10 April 2019	Los Angeles	United States	Roxy Theatre	No Rome		
12 April 2019 (Note: The concerts on 12 and 19 April 2019 are parts of Coachella Valley Music and Arts Festival.)	Indio	United States	Empire Polo Club	—N/a		
15 April 2019	Phoenix	United States	Comerica Theatre	No Rome		
16 April 2019	Las Vegas	United States	The Joint	No Rome		
17 April 2019	Los Angeles	United States	Roxy Theatre	No Rome		
19 April 2019	Indio	United States	Empire Polo Club	—N/a		
21 April 2019	Santa Barbara	United States	Santa Barbara Bowl	Pale Waves		
22 April 2019	San Francisco	United States	Bill Graham Civic Auditorium	Pale Waves		
25 April 2019	Seattle	United States	WaMu Theater	Pale Waves		
26 April 2019	Vancouver	Canada	Thunderbird Sports Centre	Pale Waves		
27 April 2019	Portland	United States	Portland Memorial Coliseum	No Rome		
29 April 2019	Orem	United States	UCCU Center	No Rome		
2 May 2019	Irving	United States	Toyota Music Factory	No Rome		
4 May 2019	Sugar Land	United States	Smart Financial Centre	No Rome		
5 May 2019	Austin	United States	Austin360 Amphitheater	No Rome		
6 May 2019	Bonner Springs	United States	Providence Medical Center Amphitheater	No Rome		
7 May 2019	Minneapolis	United States	Minneapolis Armory	No Rome		
8 May 2019	Chicago	United States	United Center	No Rome		
10 May 2019	Milwaukee	United States	Eagles Ballroom	Pale Waves		
11 May 2019	Rochester Hills	United States	Meadow Brook Amphitheatre	Pale Waves		
12 May 2019	Cincinnati	United States	Riverbend Music Center	Pale Waves		
14 May 2019	Columbus	United States	Express Live!	Pale Waves		
15 May 2019	Nashville	United States	Ascend Amphitheater	Pale Waves		
17 May 2019 (Note: The concert on 17 May 2019 at Gulf Shores Public Beach in Gulf Shores is part of Hangout Music Festival.)	Gulf Shores	United States	Gulf Shores Public Beach	—N/a		
18 May 2019	Atlanta	United States	Cadence Bank Amphitheatre	Pale Waves		
19 May 2019	Charlotte	United States	Skyla Credit Union Amphitheater	Pale Waves		
21 May 2019	Washington, D.C.	United States	The Anthem	Pale Waves		
22 May 2019	Richmond	United States	Virginia Credit Union Live!	Pale Waves		
29 May 2019	Darien	United States	Darien Lake Performing Arts Center	Pale Waves		
30 May 2019	Boston	United States	Agganis Arena	Pale Waves		
1 June 2019 (Note: The concert on 1 June 2019 at Randall's Island Park in New York City is part of Governors Ball Music Festival.)	New York City	United States	Randall's Island Park	—N/a		
2 June 2019 (Note: The concert on 2 June 2019 at Yeatman's Cove in Cincinnati is part of Bunbury Music Festival.)	Cincinnati	United States	Yeatman's Cove	—N/a		
3 June 2019	Toronto	Canada	Budweiser Stage	Pale Waves		
Eurasia						
7 June 2019 (Note: The concert on 7 June 2019 at Nürburgring in Nürburg is part of Rock am Ring.)	Nürburg	Germany	Nürburgring	—N/a		
9 June 2019 (Note: The concert on 9 June 2019 at Zeppelinfeld in Nuremberg is part of Rock im Park.)	Nuremberg	Germany	Zeppelinfeld	—N/a		
10 June 2019	Landgraaf	Netherlands	Pinkpop Music Festival	—N/a		
13 June 2019	Copenhagen	Denmark	Tap1	The Japanese House		
14 June 2019 (Note: The concert on 14 June 2019 at Sofienbergparken in Oslo is part of Piknik i Parken.)	Oslo	Norway	Sofienbergparken	—N/a		
28 June 2019 (Note: The concert on 28 June 2019 at Festivalpark in Werchter is part of Rock Werchter.)	Werchter	Belgium	Festivalpark	—N/a		
29 June 2019 (Note: The concert on 29 June 2019 at Gärdet in Stockholm is part of Lollapalooza Stockholm.)	Stockholm	Sweden	Gärdet	—N/a		
30 June 2019 (Note: The concert on 30 June 2019 at Sittertobel in St. Gallen is part of Open Air St. Gallen.)	St. Gallen	Switzerland	Sittertobel	—N/a		
4 July 2019 (Note: The concert on 4 July 2019 at Gdynia-Kosakowo Airport in Gdynia is part of Open'er Festival.)	Gdynia	Poland	Gdynia-Kosakowo Airport	—N/a		
6 July 2019 (Note: The concert on 6 July 2019 at Ruissalo in Turku is part of Ruisrock.)	Turku	Finland	Ruissalo	—N/a		
8 July 2019 (Note: The concert on 8 July 2019 at Metastadt in Vienna is part of METAStadt Open Air.)	Vienna	Austria	Metastadt	—N/a		
11 July 2019 (Note: The concert on 11 July 2019 at Valdebebas in Madrid is part of Mad Cool Festival.)	Madrid	Spain	Valdebebas	—N/a		
13 July 2019 (Note: The concert on 13 July 2019 at Trenčín Airport in Trenčín is part of Pohoda.)	Trenčín	Slovakia	Trenčín Airport	—N/a		
18 July 2019 (Note: The concert on 18 July 2019 at Meco in Sesimbra is part of Super Bock Super Rock.)	Sesimbra	Portugal	Meco	—N/a		
20 July 2019 (Note: The concert on 20 July 2019 at Recinto de Festivales in Benicàssim is part of Festival Internacional de Benicàssim.)	Benicàssim	Spain	Recinto de Festivales	—N/a		
26 July 2019 (Note: The concert on 26 July 2019 at Zvejnieku Park in Salacgrīva is part of Positivus Festival.)	Salacgrīva	Latvia	Zvejnieku Park	—N/a		
29 July 2019	St. Petersburg	Russia	A2 Green	The Japanese House		
30 July 2019	Moscow	Russia	Adrenaline Stadium	The Japanese House		
1 August 2019	Kyiv	Ukraine	Art-Zavod Platforma	The Japanese House		
6 August 2019	Vilnius	Lithuania	Vingis Park	The Japanese House		
8 August 2019 (Note: The concert on 8 August 2019 at Óbudai-sziget in Budapest is part of Sziget Festival.)	Budapest	Hungary	Óbudai-sziget	—N/a		
10 August 2019 (Note: The concert on 10 August 2019 at Domeniul Stirbey in Buftea is part of Summer Well Festival.)	Buftea	Romania	Domeniul Stirbey	—N/a		
14 August 2019 (Note: The concert on 10 August 2019 at Domeniul Stirbey in Buftea is part of Summer Well Festival.)	Dubai	United Arab Emirates	Coca-Cola Arena	—N/a		
16 August 2019 (Note: These concerts are a part of the Summer Sonic Festival)	Chiba	Japan	Makuhari Messe	—N/a		
18 August 2019 (Note: These concerts are a part of the Summer Sonic Festival)	Osaka	Japan	Ookini Arena Maishima	—N/a		
23 August 2019 (Note: The concert on 23 August 2019 at Little John's Farm in Reading is part of Reading Festival.)	Reading	England	Little John's Farm	—N/a		
24 August 2019 (Note: The concert on 24 August 2019 at Bramham Park in Leeds is part of Leeds Festival.)	Leeds	England	Bramham Park			
25 August 2019 (Note: The concert on 25 August 2019 at Bellahouston Park in Glasgow is part of Summer Sessions.)	Glasgow	Scotland	Bellahouston Park			
31 August 2019	Stradbally	Ireland	Stradbally Hall			
Asia/Oceania						
6 September 2019	Seoul	South Korea	Olympic Hall	No Rome		
8 September 2019	Hong Kong		AsiaWorld–Expo	No Rome		
11 September 2019	Pasay	Philippines	Mall of Asia Arena	No Rome		
13 September 2019	Bangkok	Thailand	Thunderdome	No Rome		
14 September 2019	Bangkok	Thailand	Thunderdome	No Rome		
16 September 2019	Singapore		The Star Performing Arts Centre	No Rome		
18 September 2019	Auckland	New Zealand	Spark Arena	No Rome		
20 September 2019	Melbourne	Australia	Margaret Court Arena	No Rome		
21 September 2019	Sydney	Australia	ICC Sydney Theatre	No Rome		
22 September 2019	Brisbane	Australia	Riverstage	No Rome		
25 September 2019	Adelaide	Australia	Entertainment Centre Theatre	No Rome		
27 September 2019	Perth	Australia	HBF Stadium	No Rome		
29 September 2019	Jakarta	Indonesia	Helipad Parking Ground	Barasuara		
Africa						
4 October 2019 (Note: The concert on 4 October 2019 at Cloof Wine Estate in Darling is part of Rocking the Daisies.)	Darling	South Africa	Cloof Wine Estate	—N/a		
6 October 2019 (Note: The concert on 6 October 2019 at Ellis Park in Johannesburg is part of In the City.)	Johannesburg	South Africa	Ellis Park	—N/a		
Europe						
2 November 2019 (Note: The concert on 2 November 2019 at Grande halle de la Villette in Paris is part of Pitchfork Music Festival Paris.)	Paris	France	Grande halle de la Villette	—N/a		
North America						
16 November 2019	Camden	United States	BB&T Pavilion	Muna; Laundry Day		
17 November 2019	Camden	United States	BB&T Pavilion	Muna; Laundry Day		
19 November 2019	Raleigh	United States	PNC Arena	—N/a		
20 November 2019	Greenville	United States	Bon Secours Wellness Arena	—N/a		
22 November 2019 (Note: The concert on 22 November 2019 at Orlando Amphitheater in Orlando is part of Florida Man Music Festival.)	Orlando	United States	Orlando Amphitheater	—N/a		
23 November 2019 (Note: The concert on 23 November 2019 at Fort Lauderdale Beach in Fort Lauderdale is part of Riptide Music Festival.)	Fort Lauderdale	United States	Fort Lauderdale Beach	—N/a		
24 November 2019 (Note: The concert on 24 November 2019 at MidFlorida Credit Union Amphitheatre in Tampa is part of 97X Next Big Thing.)	Tampa	United States	MidFlorida Credit Union Amphitheatre	—N/a		
26 November 2019	New Orleans	United States	UNO Lakefront Arena	Catfish and the Bottlemen		
27 November 2019 (Note: The concert on 27 November 2019 at The Theater at Grand Prairie in Grand Prairie is part of Alt 103.7's ALTerium.)	Grand Prairie	United States	The Theatre at Grand Prairie	—N/a		
29 November 2019 (Note: The concert on 29 November 2019 at BOK Center in Tulsa is part of Z104.5 The Edge's Black Friday Show.)	Tulsa	United States	BOK Center	—N/a		
1 December 2019	Broomfield	United States	1stBank Center	I Dont Know How but They Found Me		
2 December 2019 (Note: The concert on 2 December 2019 at The Complex in Salt Lake City is part of The X96 Toyota Nightmare Before Xmas.)	Salt Lake City	United States	The Complex	—N/a		
3 December 2019 (Note: The concert on 3 December 2019 at The Chelsea at The Cosmopolitan in Las Vegas is part of X107.5's Holiday Havoc.)	Las Vegas	United States	The Chelsea at The Cosmopolitan	—N/a		
5 December 2019	San Diego	United States	Pechanga Arena	Catfish and the Bottlemen; I Dont Know How but They Found Me; Fashion Jackson		
6 December 2019 (Note: The concert on 6 December 2019 at Golden 1 Center in Sacramento is part of Alt 94.7 Presents Electric Xmas.)	Sacramento	United States	Golden 1 Center	—N/a		
7 December 2019 (Note: The concert on 7 December 2019 at SAP Center in San Jose is part of Alt 103.5's Not So Silent Night.)	San Jose	United States	SAP Center	—N/a		
10 December 2019 (Note: The concert on 10 December 2019 at WaMu Theatre in Seattle is part of 107.7 The End Presents Deck the Hall Ball.)	Seattle	United States	WaMu Theatre	—N/a		
12 December 2019 (Note: The concert on 12 December 2019 at Aragon Ballroom in Chicago is part of The Nights We Stole Christmas.)	Chicago	United States	Aragon Ballroom	—N/a		
13 December 2019 (Note: The concert on 13 December 2019 at Indiana Farmers Coliseum in Indianapolis is part of The Night Alt 103.3 Stole Xmas.)	Indianapolis	United States	Indiana Farmers Coliseum	—N/a		
Oceania						
27 January 2020 (Note: These dates are part of St Jerome's Laneway Festival.)	Auckland	New Zealand	Albert Park Precinct	—N/a		
1 February 2020	Brisbane	Australia	Brisbane Showgrounds	—N/a		
2 February 2020	Sydney	Australia	The Domain	—N/a		
7 February 2020	Adelaide	Australia	Hart's Mill	—N/a		
8 February 2020	Melbourne	Australia	Footscray Park	—N/a		
9 February 2020	Fremantle	Australia	Esplanade Reserve & West End	—N/a		
Europe						
15 February 2020	Nottingham	England	Motorpoint Arena	Beabadoobee		
16 February 2020	Newcastle	England	Utilita Arena Newcastle	Beabadoobee		
17 February 2020	Leeds	England	First Direct Arena	Beabadoobee		
19 February 2020	Bournemouth	England	Bournemouth International Centre	Beabadoobee		
21 February 2020	London	England	The O_{2} Arena	Beabadoobee		
22 February 2020	London	England	The O_{2} Arena	Beabadoobee		
23 February 2020	Cardiff	Wales	Motorpoint Arena	Beabadoobee		
25 February 2020	Birmingham	England	Arena Birmingham	Beabadoobee		
26 February 2020	Liverpool	England	M&S Bank Arena	Beabadoobee		
28 February 2020	Manchester	England	Manchester Arena	Beabadoobee		
29 February 2020	Aberdeen	Scotland	P&J Live	Beabadoobee		
1 March 2020	Glasgow	Scotland	The SSE Hydro	Beabadoobee		
3 March 2020	Dublin	Ireland	3Arena	Beabadoobee		

=== Cancelled shows ===
List of cancelled concerts, showing date, city, country, venue and reason
Date	City	Country	Venue		Reason
27 April 2020	The Woodlands	United States	Cynthia Woods Mitchell Pavilion	Phoebe Bridgers; Beabadoobee	COVID-19 pandemic
29 April 2020	Austin	United States	Germania Insurance Amphitheater	Phoebe Bridgers; Beabadoobee	COVID-19 pandemic
1 May 2020 (Note: The concert on May 1, 2020 in Memphis at Tom Lee Park is part of the Beale Street Music Festival.)	Memphis	United States	Tom Lee Park	Phoebe Bridgers; Beabadoobee	COVID-19 pandemic
2 May 2020	Dallas	United States	Dos Equis Pavilion	Phoebe Bridgers; Beabadoobee	COVID-19 pandemic
3 May 2020	El Paso	United States	Don Haskins Center	Phoebe Bridgers; Beabadoobee	COVID-19 pandemic
5 May 2020	Glendale	United States	Gila River Arena	Phoebe Bridgers	COVID-19 pandemic
7 May 2020	Inglewood	United States	The Forum	Phoebe Bridgers	COVID-19 pandemic
8 May 2020	Irvine	United States	FivePoint Amphitheatre	Phoebe Bridgers; Beabadoobee	COVID-19 pandemic
11 May 2020	Morrison	United States	Red Rocks Amphitheatre	Phoebe Bridgers; Beabadoobee	COVID-19 pandemic
13 May 2020	Omaha	United States	Baxter Arena	Phoebe Bridgers; Beabadoobee	COVID-19 pandemic
14 May 2020	St. Louis	United States	Enterprise Center	Phoebe Bridgers; Beabadoobee	COVID-19 pandemic
16 May 2020	Saint Paul	United States	Xcel Energy Center	Phoebe Bridgers; Beabadoobee	COVID-19 pandemic
18 May 2020	Milwaukee	United States	Fiserv Forum	Phoebe Bridgers; Beabadoobee	COVID-19 pandemic
19 May 2020	Columbus	United States	Schottenstein Center	Phoebe Bridgers; Beabadoobee	COVID-19 pandemic
21 May 2020	Toronto	Canada	Budweiser Stage	Phoebe Bridgers; Beabadoobee	COVID-19 pandemic
23 May 2020	Washington, D.C	United States	The Anthem	Phoebe Bridgers; Beabadoobee	COVID-19 pandemic
26 May 2020	New York City	United States	Madison Square Garden	Phoebe Bridgers; Beabadoobee	COVID-19 pandemic
29 May 2020	Hanover	United States	Live! Casino & Hotel	Phoebe Bridgers; Beabadoobee	COVID-19 pandemic
30 May 2020 (Note: The concert on May 30, 2020 in Camden at BB&T Pavilion is part of the Radio 104.5 13th Birthday Celebration.)	Camden	United States	BB&T Pavilion	Phoebe Bridgers; Beabadoobee	COVID-19 pandemic
2 June 2020	Pittsburgh	United States	Petersen Events Center	Phoebe Bridgers; Beabadoobee	COVID-19 pandemic
3 June 2020	Cleveland	United States	Rocket Mortgage FieldHouse	Phoebe Bridgers; Beabadoobee	COVID-19 pandemic
5 June 2020	Virginia Beach	United States	Veterans United Home Loans Amphitheater	Phoebe Bridgers; Beabadoobee	COVID-19 pandemic
6 June 2020	Charlotte	United States	Spectrum Center	Phoebe Bridgers; Beabadoobee	COVID-19 pandemic
8 June 2020	Jacksonville	United States	Daily's Place	Phoebe Bridgers; Beabadoobee	COVID-19 pandemic
9 June 2020	Miami	United States	Bayfront Park Amphitheater	Phoebe Bridgers; Beabadoobee	COVID-19 pandemic
11 June 2020	Duluth	United States	Infinite Energy Arena	Beabadoobee	COVID-19 pandemic
12 June 2020 (Note: The concert on June 12, 2020 in Manchester at Great Stage Park is part of the Bonnaroo Music Festival.)	Manchester	United States	Great Stage Park	—N/a	COVID-19 pandemic
11 July 2020	London	England	Finsbury Park	Charli XCX; Clairo; Pale Waves; Phoebe Bridgers; Cavetown; Beabadoobee; Deb Never	COVID-19 pandemic

== Box office score data ==
Venue	City	Tickets sold / available	Gross revenue	Ref.
O_{2} Arena	London	34,981 / 36,635	$1,485,510	
Express Live!	Columbus	9,329 / 9,329	$419,805	
