= Vote With Us =

American political advocacy campaign

- Date: 10/22/2020
- Type: Campaign
- Cause: Voting Turnout
- Organized by: March On
- Website: votewith.us

Vote With Us was a voting campaign designed to promote early voting in the 2020 United States presidential election. The campaign featured in-person events across the country and a virtual rally featuring notable celebrities and voting activists.

== In Person Events ==
An 11-day mobilization organized under the Vote With Us campaign features socially-distanced parades, pop-up Drag shows, skateboard caravans, virtual fill-out-your-ballot parties aimed to create unprecedented voter turnout among young people and communities of color in the final days leading up to the general election.

An 8 city Vote With Us bus tour kicked off in Houston, Texas, on October 13, 2020, where partners gathered to vote in person or drop off mail-in ballots at approved and physically secure locations through Texas, Mississippi, Alabama, Tennessee, Florida, North and South Carolina, and Georgia.

== Virtual Rally ==
On Vote Early Day, October 24, 2020, a three-hour virtual rally was streamed online featuring youth activists across the country alongside notable celebrities to inspire youth to vote early.

The event features performances, appearances and support by Justin Bieber, Common, Andra Day, Candice Dupree, Emma González, David Hogg, Demi Lovato, VIC MENSA, Renee Montgomery, Mark Ruffalo, and more.

The event was co-hosted with notable activist organizations, including Black Voters Matter, Future Coalition, The Early Vote, Headcount, March On, ‘Us Kids’ Film, Vote Early Day, We Stand United, among others.
