= Berlioz (surname) =

Berlioz is a surname of Arpitan origin. Like many Arpitan anthroponyms, the final -z only marks paroxytonic stress and should not be pronounced. Nevertheless, it is often pronounced in French through hypercorrection. Notable people with the surname include:

- Hector Berlioz (1803–1869), French composer and conductor
- Jacques Berlioz (1891–1975), French zoologist
- Jacques Berlioz (historian) (born 1953), French historian
- Sergio Berlioz (born 1963), Mexican composer and musicologist
