= March On For Voting Rights =

Protests for voting rights in the US

- Date: 08/28/2021
- Type: Political campaign
- Cause: Voting reform
- Organized by: March On
- Website: https://marchonforvotingrights.org/

March On For Voting Rights was a mass mobilization organized by civil rights leaders in support of the For The People Act held on August 28, 2021.

== For the People Act ==
The announcement of the march came one day after Senate Republicans blocked the For the People Act – a signature voting and election bill that Democrats had pitched to counter state-level efforts. Republicans had expressed widespread opposition to the measure, arguing it was designed to help Democrats succeed in future elections.

== Organizers ==
Martin Luther King III, the eldest son of Martin Luther King Jr., led the march with his family’s organization the Drum Major Institute along with March On, Service Employees International Union, Future Coalition, and Al Sharpton lead with his organization, National Action Network.

March On said the need for federal voting rights protections increased dramatically after the Jan. 6 riot at the U.S. Capitol. Major organizers included Martin Luther King III and Cesar Chavez's grandson Alejandro Chavez.

== Marches ==
The August 28 march was planned for the 58th anniversary of the historic March on Washington where Martin Luther King Jr. delivered his “I Have a Dream” speech. Marches were held in Washington DC, Atlanta, Miami, Phoenix and Houston. The rallies were intended to put pressure on Democratic senators to eliminate or weaken the filibuster, which would allow Democrats to pass the legislation without Republican support.

Those attending the march in Washington gathered at McPherson Square at 8 a.m. before starting the march at 9:45 a.m. The group marched past Black Lives Matter Plaza, the White House and the Washington Monument before demonstrating from 11:30 a.m. to 3 p.m. near the National Museum of African American History and Culture at 15th Street and Constitution Avenue NW.

=== DC ===
Thousands of people marched in DC Civil rights leaders joined by about 70 D.C. statehood activists at Freedom Plaza in Northwest to insist making the District the 51st state is a priority for the national voting rights movement.

=== Atlanta ===
Hundreds of people marched in Atlanta to support federal voting rights legislation. Outside the King Center, supporters called on Congress to pass the John Lewis Voting Rights Advancement Act — named for the Atlanta civil rights leader and congressman who died last year. Later, they marched past Ebenezer Baptist Church to the John Lewis mural on Auburn Avenue to honor the bill’s namesake.

=== Florida ===
Hundreds of people marched in Florida in Miami and West Palm Beach.

=== Arizona ===
Hundreds of Arizonans gathered in Phoenix for the march. The event was held indoors at Pilgrim's Rest Baptist Church in lieu of an outdoor march due to Phoenix's extreme August heat, according to event organizers. Attendees listened in on a church service with modifications to fit the event, such as speeches about voting that then transitioned to panels with community leaders.
