= 99 Neighbors =

American music group

- Origin: Burlington, Vermont, United States
- Genres: Hip hop; Rap; R&B; Trap; Jazz
- Years active: 2018–2023, 2024-present
- Labels: Warner Records, Nice Work Inc., 99 Neighbors LLC
- Members: Sam "Maari" Paulino; Hank "HANKNATIVE" Collins; Connor "Swank" Stankevich; Nadia Nygaard; Caleb "Somba" Hoh; Julian "Juju" Segar-Reid; Jared Fier
- Website: www.99nbrs.com

99 Neighbors is an American music group formed in Burlington, Vermont. It consists of seven members: Connor "Swank" Stankevich, Hank "HANKNATIVE" Collins, Sam Paulino, Nadia Nygaard (Note: Nygaard uses they/she pronouns and is referred to as Nadia in song credits.), Julian "Anteneh" Segar-Reid, Caleb "Somba" Hoh, and Jared Fier. The members comprise singers, rappers, and producers. Its music – a combination of hip hop, jazz, rock, and R&B influences – has drawn comparisons to Odd Future and Brockhampton.

== History ==
Members Nygaard, Paulino, and Collins graduated from South Burlington High School in South Burlington, Vermont. While there, Paulino and Collins played football and lacrosse together and performed as part of the school's jazz band under Dave Grippo, which they later cited as an artistic influence. After graduating from high school, Paulino and Collins shared an apartment in Burlington, where they began recording and producing music full-time collectively. Hoh and Segar-Reid grew up together in Burlington. The members eventually met in the South End neighborhood and formed a group, putting out their early music through SoundCloud, with Calhoun Rawlings managing them. From there, the group gained local notoriety playing shows at venues such as Higher Ground, Arts Riot, The Lip, and Jim's Basement.

== Music release ==
On January 1, 2019, 99 Neighbors released its first studio album, Television. It took the band two months to record the full-length debut album. In the same year, Fier became a DJ and started producing with the group.

In July 2019, the group signed a deal with Warner Records' manager Pat Corcoran, who formally managed Chance the Rapper.

Since signing with Warner Records, the group has released multiple singles. In October 2019, they released a song in collaboration with brass group Brasstracks and singer-songwriter PhiloSofie, titled "F**k No". The single has been streamed over 20 million times on Spotify. Other notable tracks by 99 Neighbors include "Fake Pods" and "Ripstick", which have amassed over 11 million streams on Spotify.

== Discography ==
=== Albums and singles ===
List of releases, with year released
Title	Release date
Television (studio album)	Released: January 1, 2019; Formats: Digital download
"Welcome to Chili's" (single)	Released: April 20, 2019; Formats: Digital download
"Fake Pods" (single)	Released: July 30, 2019; Label: Nice Work, Warner Records, 99 Neighbors LLC; Formats: Digital download
"Ripstick" (single)	Released: August 20, 2019; Label: Nice Work, Warner Records, 99 Neighbors LLC; Formats: Digital download
"F**k No" (single) (with Brasstracks & PhiloSofie)	Released: September 10, 2019; Label: Nice Work, Warner Records, 99 Neighbors LLC; Formats: Digital download
"Thunder" (single)	Released: October 4, 2019; Label: Nice Work, Warner Records, 99 Neighbors LLC; Formats: Digital download
"19" (single)	Released: November 6, 2019; Label: Nice Work, Warner Records, 99 Neighbors LLC; Formats: Digital download
"QWOP / Basement" (single)	Released: July 24, 2020; Label: Nice Work, Warner Records, 99 Neighbors LLC; Formats: Digital download
"GUTS" (single)	Released: December 11, 2020; Label: Nice Work, Warner Records, 99 Neighbors LLC; Formats: Digital download
"Live a Little" (single)	Released: July 6, 2021; Label: Nice Work, Warner Records, 99 Neighbors LLC; Formats: Digital download
"49er" (single)	Released: August 6, 2021; Label: Nice Work, Warner Records, 99 Neighbors LLC; Formats: Digital download
"N. Michigan Gospel" (single)	Released: September 9, 2021; Label: Nice Work, Warner Records, 99 Neighbors LLC; Formats: Digital download
Wherever You're Going I Hope It's Great (studio album)	Released: September 24, 2021; Label: Nice Work, Warner Records, 99 Neighbors LLC; Formats: Digital download
"Static" (single) (with Wahid)	Released: August 12, 2022; Label: 99 Records, Good Partners; Formats: Digital download
"Waldosia" (single)	Released: March 3, 2023; Label: 99 Records, Good Partners; Formats: Digital download
"Airlock" (single)	Released: March 24, 2023; Label: 99 Records, Good Partners; Formats: Digital download
"Selfish" (single)	Released: April 28, 2023; Label: 99 Records, Good Partners; Formats: Digital download
