= Quarters (band) =

American rock band

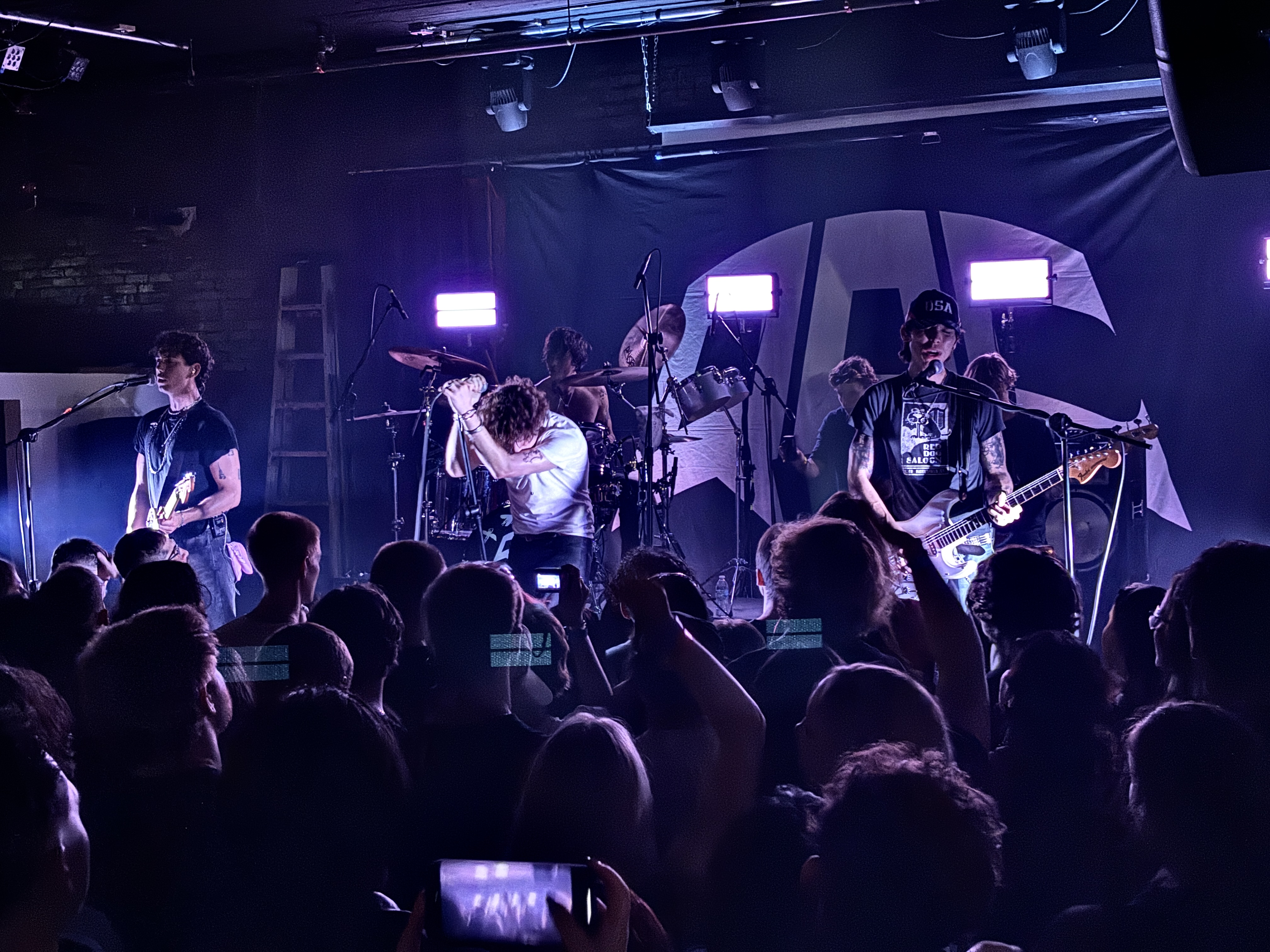
- Quarters performing in Dallas in 2024. From left: Ben Acker, Ben Roter, Attila Anrather, and Jasper Harris.

Background information
- Origin: New York City, New York, U.S.
- Genres: alternative rock; indie rock; pop rock
- Years active: 2017–present
- Labels: 300 Entertainment; Elektra Records; Warner Music Group
- Members: Ben Roter; Jasper Harris; Attila Anrather
- Past members: Ben Acker; Adrian Ercilla Antrobus
- Website: quartersofchange.com

Quarters is an American rock band from New York City, New York, that was founded in 2017. The band consists of lead vocalist and guitarist Ben Roter, guitarist Jasper Harris, and drummer Attila Anrather. The band is currently signed to 300 Entertainment and Elektra Records.

Since their formation, Quarters has released three studio albums: Into the Rift (2022), Portraits (2024), and I Hope This Isn't the End of the World (2026). The band has performed at South by Southwest, Lollapalooza, Austin City Limits, Governor's Ball, and Shaky Knees Music Festival.

== Background ==
While in elementary school in New York City, Ben Acker and Jasper Harris would play rock music together under the name Concrete Jungle. In eighth grade, Ben Roter and Attila Anrather also joined, forming the quartet. All four members cite influence from their respective fathers, who were also musicians.

They spent their high school years at Beacon High School teaching themselves how to record, releasing a self-titled debut EP that they tracked in the school’s basement and uploaded to Bandcamp.

In 2017, the four decided to form Quarters, and began to write and record songs together.

The band has supported other acts such as Jonas Brothers, Bad Suns, Two Door Cinema Club, The Band Camino, and Joywave.

In 2025, the band changed their name from Quarters of Change to Quarters.

== Musical style ==
Quarters' musical style has been described as indie rock, pop rock, and alternative rock. They have also been described as, "Anchored by a mutual predisposition for unpredictability, Quarters fuse together a signature hybrid of nineties-style alternative hooks, crunchy space rock soundscapes, and strutting seventies grooves."

The band cites influences such as The Strokes, Red Hot Chili Peppers, Rage Against The Machine, MGMT, Tom Petty, and Daft Punk.

Artists such as Joe Jonas, Lewis Capaldi, Chad Smith, and Fred Durst have notably become fans of the band.

== Band members ==
=== Current members ===
- Ben Roter – lead vocals, rhythm guitar (2017–present)
- Jasper Harris – lead guitar, bass, synthesizer, backing vocals (2017–present)
- Attila Anrather – drums (2017–present)

=== Touring musicians ===
- Mark Pogg – bass (2023–present)
- Taylor Morris – bass (2023–present)

=== Past members ===
- Adrian Ercilla Antrobus – bass (2017–2019)
- Ben Acker - rhythm guitar, bass, synthesizer, backing vocals (2019-2025)

== Discography ==
=== Albums ===
- Into The Rift (2022)
- Portraits (2024)
- I Hope This Isn't The End Of The World (2026)

=== Extended plays ===
- Hey (2020)
- New Hour (2021)
