= Bridge the Divide =

Youth political organization

Bridge the Divide is an international political organization aimed at establishing dialogue among teenagers of differing ideological views to openly and freely converse. The organization was launched in the wake of increasing political divisiveness both within the United States and abroad. Bridge the Divide was launched in 2016 by two American teenagers who hope to see people with polarized views find common ground, and support politicians that take a less hostile approach to policy.
