= Sergio Berlioz =

Mexican composer & musicologist (born 1963)

- Born: Sergio Berlioz; 1963 (age 62–63); Mexico City, Mexico
- Genres: Classical music
- Occupations: Composer, Conductor, Musicologist, Pedagogue, Speaker
- Instruments: Viola, Piano
- Years active: 1978–present

Sergio Berlioz (born 1963 in Mexico City) is a composer and musicologist who has participated in over 4000 conferences, round tables and concerts; with almost four decades of academic experience, Sergio Berlioz has taught and given seminars and lectures on music and history of art at various universities and cultural institutions throughout Mexico and the Czech Republic. He currently teaches in Casa Lamm, where his "Musical Wednesday" conferences have become popular, and in the Instituto Cultural México Israel where he was recognized in 2015 as a valuable teacher and lecturer collaborating over twenty years in that institution.

== Life ==
Berlioz has published more than a thousand articles and essays in Mexico, Hungary, Greece, United States, Argentina, Peru, Turkey, Morocco, Belgium and Israel.

As musical conductor, he has worked with Lorin Maazel, George Sebastian, Plácido Domingo, Ramón Vargas, Samuel Máynez, Horacio Franco and Juan Trigos, among others; and has served as personal assistant to Kurt Redel, Eduardo Díaz-Muñoz (Orquesta Filarmónica del Conservatorio Nacional de Música de la Ciudad de México and the Orquesta Filarmónica de la UNAM), and to Leonard Bernstein.

He has been guest conductor for the Orquesta Sinfónica and the Orquesta de Cámara de la Universidad de Guanajuato, Orquesta Sinfónica de San Luis Potosí, the Orquesta Sinfónica de Coyoacán, the Orquesta Filarmónica del Conservatorio Nacional de Música, the Coro del Instituto Cardenal Miranda, the Ensamble Contemporáneo and the Orquesta de Cámara de la Universidad Autónoma de Zacatecas, the Symphony Orchestra of the City of Puebla . and currently the Filarmonic Orchestra Five of May (City of Puebla) In 1986, Berlioz founded the Orquesta de Cámara Ensamble Contemporáneo Independiente, of which he has been Director, and with which he has toured through Zacatecas, San Luis Potosí, Puebla and Mexico City, premiering in this city original compositions by Messiaen, Estrada, Bartók and Janáček, as well as by a new generation of Mexican composers.

== Composition ==
He has composed six symphonies, eleven string quartets, a requiem, symphonic poems, as well as concertos for flute, cello, clavecin, oboe, guitar, cello, fagot also an octet for cello, sonatas, trios, quintets, and others. Some highlights include the Second String Quartet “Yizkor”, Three Postcards for Oboe and Double String Orchestra, First Symphony Etz Chaim (Tree of Life), Second Symphony Undefeated Voices, for symphonic orchestra, soloists and double mixed chorus, Réquiem por las almas de arena (For the Souls of Sand), the symphonic poems Las vías del tiempo: Homenaje a Claudio Magris (The Rails of Time, for Claudio Magris), and Toledo: La ciudad de las generaciones (Toledo, City of Generations), his Concerto for flute, chorus, and strings Ángeles de proa (Rowing Angels), and his Concerto for cello Chalomei Assaf (The Dreams of Assaf).

In 2012, Sergio Berlioz performed for the first time with an unprecedent success his Fifth symphony "La luz de mayo" ("The May light"), commissioned by The Government of the State of Puebla commemorating 150 years of The Battle of Puebla on May 5, 1862, during the French intervention in Mexico.

The Sixth symphony "Elegía heroica" ("Heroic elegy") is a work commissioned to Sergio Berlioz in the year 2012 by The Government of the State of Puebla to commemorate 150 years of the Siege of Puebla (March 16–17, 1863) during the French intervention in Mexico, was written between 2012–13 but it was not until 2016 when the "Elegia heroica" finally was world premiered with great success.

== Other works ==
He is also the author of "Educar con música" published in 2002 by Aguilar editorial (México) about the multiple benefits of music in children's develop, even before birth as he says in the introduction : "It has been proven that children with musical training improve their capabilities abstraction, psychomotor response, mediate and immediate memory, oral expression of feelings and complex concepts, besides presenting a healthy trend towards social integration. Music is an ideal gateway to the consequent appreciation of other artistic expressions and academic disciplines in general." But to Sergio Berlioz despite the develop of abilities is the deep meaning of music in live: " music not only improves the ability to think and direction and quality objectives; humanizes the meaning of actions is a conglomerate, a multivitamin for the person who give oneself to it ".

Currently, he is host of the cultural show on Mexican radio "Biblioteca Pública", which can be heard every Sunday at 12 noon on Radio Red 1110 AM.

== Awards ==
He is the winner of the 1989 Premio Nacional de Periodismo, and in 1992 the Honorary Mention of the Premio Nacional de Periodismo Musical “Esperanza Pulido”. He was also awarded the Premio Instituto Cultural México-Israel 2003 for his outstanding career as a journalist in Mexico and Israel.

In December 1998, he was acknowledged by the Hungarian government for his research on the music of Béla Bartók; and in June 1999 he was given the Leoš Janáček Medal in the Czech Republic.
