= Laundry Day (band) =

American pop-rock band

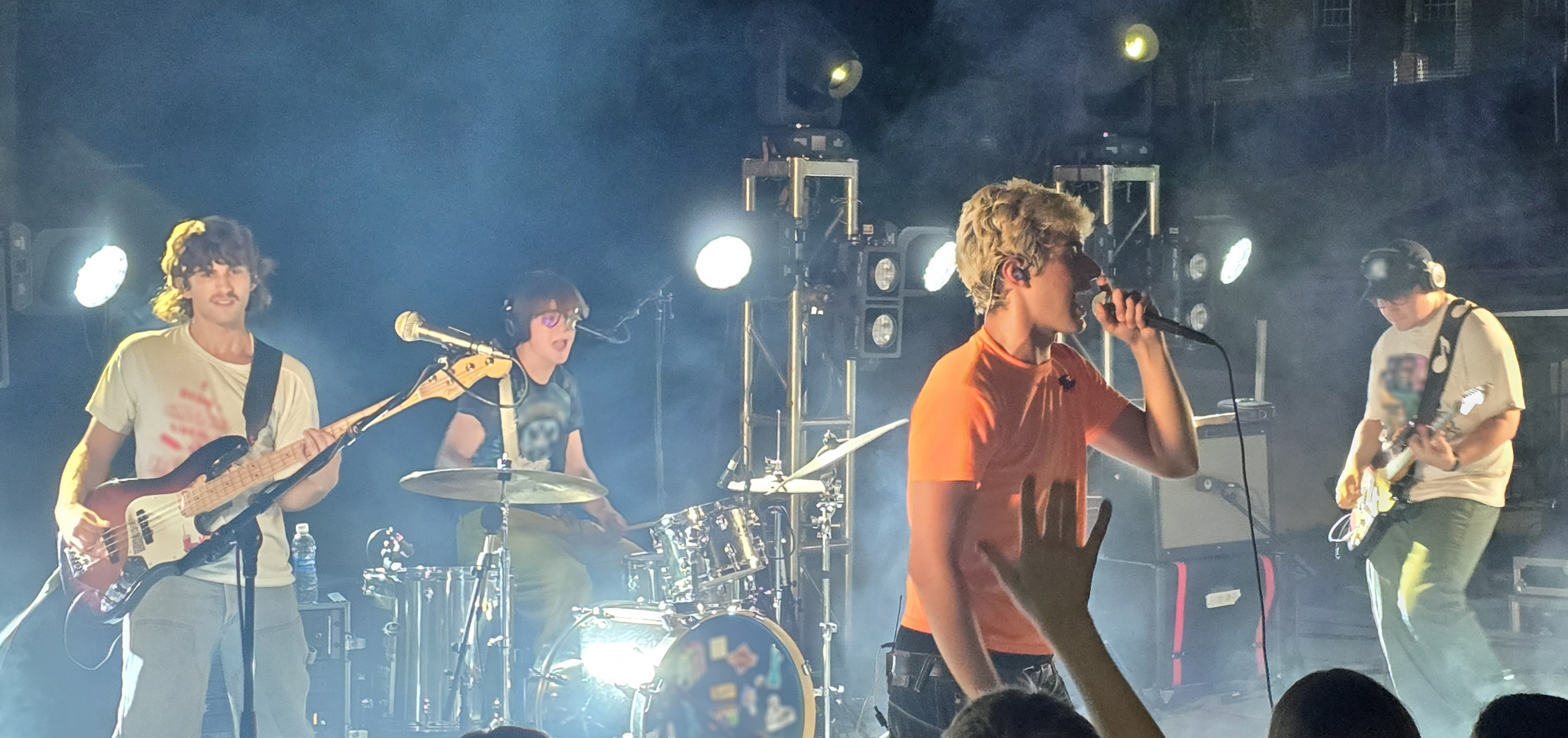
- (L-R) Henry Pearl, Sawyer Nunes, Jude Ciulla-Lipkin, and Henry Weingartner performing in 2024.

Background information
- Origin: Manhattan, New York, U.S.
- Genre: Pop rock
- Years active: 2017–present
- Labels: R&R, Polo and Fomo, Warner Records
- Members: Sawyer Nunes; Jude Ciulla-Lipkin; Henry Weingartner; Henry Pearl
- Past members: Etai Abramovich
- Website: daundrylay.com

Laundry Day (stylized in all caps) is an American pop rock band from Manhattan, New York, formed in 2017. The group currently consists of vocalist Jude Ciulla-Lipkin, vocalist and drummer Sawyer Nunes, guitarist Henry Weingartner, and bassist Henry Pearl. The band was formed while all four current members were students at Beacon High School.

== History ==
Vocalists Sawyer Nunes and Jude Ciulla-Lipkin, who had been friends prior to starting the band, began making music together while attending Beacon High School in the Hell's Kitchen area of Manhattan in New York City. Nunes had previously appeared on Broadway, in the original Broadway casts of Finding Neverland as George Llewelyn Davies and Gettin' the Band Back Together as Ricky. After the two created their first song together, their friends/classmates Henry Weingartner and Etai Abramovich joined the band. Henry Pearl, another friend from Beacon, joined the band shortly after.

Laundry Day released their debut album, Trumpet Boy, in March 2018, via their independent label Polo and Fomo. One month later, they released their first extended play, Light Up Shoes. In June 2018, they released their second album, Keep It Bright.

Their third studio album, Homesick, was released in March 2019. The album was co-produced with Romil Hemnani of Brockhampton and recorded partially at Shangri-La Studio.

To promote the album, the group embarked on two tours that year: the Together Forever Tour, with concerts held on weekends given the members' school schedules, and the All My Friends Tour, with 11 performance dates throughout August 2019.

The band also performed at the Austin City Limits Music Festival in October 2019, and in November 2019, they performed at Tyler, the Creator's Camp Flog Gnaw Carnival. That same month, they played as an opening act for The 1975 during the North American leg of their Music for Cars tour, and released their second extended play, Light Up Shoes 2. The group then performed as an opening act for Clairo in December 2019 during the European leg of her Immunity Tour. Their song "Friends" was used as the closing song in the season 3 finale of the Netflix series On My Block.

The band signed to Warner Records, and in February 2022, released their fourth album, We Switched Bodies. Their fifth album, Younger Than I Was Before, was released in two parts, with the first 12 songs being released in June 2023, and the second half of the album, consisting of 14 tracks, being released as a surprise in September 2023.

In 2024, drummer Etai Abramovich stepped away from the band to pursue personal ambitions. The band played as the opening act for the Spend The Night Tour by Teezo Touchdown in March, and opened for Ed Sheeran at the Barclays Center in Brooklyn, New York in May.

In October 2025, they released their sixth album, Earworm, and announced The Time of Your Life Tour.

== Public image ==
NME placed Laundry Day on the NME 100, their annual list of "essential new artists", in January 2020.

In 2024, they began going viral on TikTok and Instagram Reels for their videos, primarily consisting of the group singing popular songs with comedic riffs and harmonies.

== Artistry ==
Laundry Day has cited their biggest influences as rapper Tyler, the Creator and the band Brockhampton. The band has also cited the impact of some of the band's broadway backgrounds on their music. Laundry Day's members are multi-instrumentalists, and often play different instruments on their recordings than they do live. Their "DIY ethos" has been remarked upon by various publications. Their sound has been defined as "genre-defying".

== Members ==
Current members

- Sawyer Nunes – vocals, guitar, keyboard, drums (2018–present)
- Jude Ciulla-Lipkin – vocals, keyboard, guitar (2018–present)
- Henry Weingartner – guitar, vocals (2018–present)
- Henry Pearl – bass (2018–present)

Former members

- Etai Abramovich – drums (2018–2024)

== Discography ==
=== Albums ===
Title	Details
Trumpet Boy	Released: March 23, 2018; Label: Polo and Fomo; Format: Digital download
Keep It Bright	Released: June 16, 2018; Label: Polo and Fomo; Format: Digital download
Homesick	Released: March 22, 2019; Label: Polo and Fomo; Format: LP, digital download
We Switched Bodies	Released: February 11, 2022; Label: Polo and Fomo - under Warner Records; Format: Digital download
Younger Than I Was Before	Released: September 1, 2023; Label: Polo and Fomo; Format: Digital download
Earworm	Released: October 10, 2025; Label: R&R; Format: CD, LP, digital download

=== Extended plays ===
Title	Details
Light Up Shoes	Released: April 20, 2018; Label: Polo and Fomo; Format: Digital download
Light Up Shoes 2	Released: November 29, 2019; Label: Polo and Fomo; Format: Digital download

=== Singles ===
Title	Year	Album
"Thunder and Rain"	2017	Non-album singles
"Song of the Summer"	2017	Non-album singles
"Jane"	2018	Keep It Bright
"Flowers"	2018	Keep It Bright
"Cha"	2019	HOMESICK
"Harvard"	2019	HOMESICK
"Connect 5"	2021	We Switched Bodies
"Worry Bout Yourself"	2021	We Switched Bodies
"Did You Sleep Last Night?"	2022	We Switched Bodies
"The Knots"	2022	We Switched Bodies
"Back to Blonde"	2022	Non-album singles
"Moved On"	2022	Non-album singles
"We All Gotta Find a Reason"	2023	Younger Than I Was Before
"Dysmorphia"	2023	Younger Than I Was Before
"Crazy Stupid Love / My Shining Star"	2023	Younger Than I Was Before
"Why is everyone a DJ?"	2024	Non-album singles
"Damn Shame"	2024	Non-album singles
"No Go"	2025	Non-album singles
"Other Side of the World"	2025	Non-album singles
"She Knows Me"	2025	Non-album singles
"Supermodel"	2025	Earworm
"Aperol Spritz"	2025	Earworm
"Shut Up, I Love You"	2026	Earworm (Deluxe Edition)
"Homegirl" (featuring Teezo Touchdown)	2026	Earworm (Deluxe Edition)

=== Music Videos ===
Title	Year	Director(s)
"Bagels"	2018	PAF Video
"Martha's Vineyard Biker Gang"	2018	PAF Video
"Flowers"	2018	PAF Video
"Lawn"	2018	PAF Video
"Cha"	2019	PAF Video
"Harvard"	2019	PAF Video
"Red Roses"	2019	PAF Video
"I Feel Good"	2019	PAF Video
"Honey"	2019	PAF Video
"Crème"	2020	PAF Video
"Bulldog"	2020	PAF Video
"Denim"	2020	PAF Video
"Karat"	2020	PAF Video
"Mother Duet"	2020	PAF Video
"Connect 5"	2021	PAF Video
"Worry Bout Yourself"	2021	PAF Video
"Did You Sleep Last Night?"	2022	PAF Video
"We Switched Bodies"	2022	PAF Video
"Mary Jane"	2022	PAF Video
"Lemons And Limes"	2022	PAF Video
"You'll See That You Love Me"	2022	PAF Video
"Adore"	2022	PAF Video
"Skiv's Heartbreak"	2022	PAF Video
"Back To Blonde"	2022	PAF Video
"Girls Girls Girls (Remix)"	2022	PAF Video
"Moved On"	2022	PAF Video
"My Life"	2023	PAF Video
"Y.K.Y.N.U.N.Y. (You Know You Need Unique New York)"	2023	PAF Video
"Why is everyone a DJ?"	2024	PAF Video
"Damn Shame"	2024	PAF Video
"Other Side of the World"	2025	PAF Video
"She Knows Me"	2025	PAF Video
"Aperol Spritz"	2025	Patrick Linehan
"Shut Up, I Love You"	2026	Goosie
"Homegirl" (featuring Teezo Touchdown)	2026	Justin Mariano and Jude Lipkin

== Tours ==
Headlining

- All My Friends Tour (2019)
- Together Forever Tour (2019)
- We Switched Bodies Tour (2022)
- The Time of Your Life Tour (2025–2026)

Opening acts

- Clairo – Immunity Tour (2019)
- The 1975 – Music for Cars (2019)
- Neon Trees – The Favorite Daze Tour (2023)
- Teezo Touchdown – The Spend The Night Tour (2024)
- D4vd – Withered (2025)
- Malcolm Todd – The Wholesome Rockstar Tour Pt. 2 (2025)
