= March On (organization) =

American political activism group

- Formation: October 2017
- Type: Political non-profit group
- Leader: Corryn Grace Freeman
- Website: WeAreMarchOn.org

March On, stylized as March ON, is an American nonprofit organization of women-led and grassroots political activist groups that grew out of the women's marches of January 21, 2017.

== About ==
March On organizes women across the country to create progressive political power through focusing on electoral politics. March On is women-led, but all-inclusive organization that employs political strategy to coordinate actions at the federal, state, and local level through the joint efforts of millions of marches.

=== March on the Polls ===
March on The Polls is March On's election-year initiative to increase voter turnout and change the narrative around voting and civic participation. Women's March and other grassroots groups in cities across the country are planning events aimed at increasing progressive turnout. These event range from marches, organizing caravans for voters displaced by Hurricane Florence, to encouraging first-time voters through a full day of community engagement. While tied under the March On organization, each march is different, reflecting local particularities.

=== 50 Miles More ===
50 Miles More is the youth arm of March On the grew out as a response to the school shooting in Parkland, Florida in 2018. 50 Miles More is a student-led gun control organization that conducts fifty mile marches to advocate for gun control in America. They have completed two marches to date, the first in Wisconsin, where they confronted Paul Ryan, and the second in Massachusetts where they confronted the Smith & Wesson factory where many of the guns used in school shootings are manufactured. The goal of the organization is to organize fifty mile marches in all fifty states in the USA.

=== 2018 Women's March ===
Around 250 marches, rallies, and actions took place on the anniversary of the 2017 Women's March, many coordinated by March On.

=== Future Coalition ===
The Future Coalition is a coalition of over 25 youth-led activist organizations focused on progressive activism. March For Our Lives also signed on to be a part of the coalition's first initiative, Walkout To Vote. The Future Coalition has been incubated by March On as their “youth arm.”

=== September 20 Climate Strike ===
March On aided in organizing the September 20 Climate Strike, an international strike and protest led by young people and adults held three days before the UN Climate Summit in NYC on September 20 across the US and world to demand action be taken to address the climate crisis. The event is one of the largest climate mobilizations in US history. The event is a part of the school strike for climate movement.

=== Vote With Us ===
March On created the Vote With Us campaign designed to promote early voting in the 2020 United States presidential election. The campaign features in person events across the country and a virtual rally featuring notable celebrities and voting activists.

=== March On For Voting Rights ===
March On For Voting Rights is a mass mobilization on August 28, the 58th anniversary of Martin Luther King Jr.'s historic March on Washington organized by March On and other notable civil rights leaders in response to Senate Republicans blocking the For The People Act.

== History ==
March On was formed by the leaders of the women's marches across the country in October 2017. The leaders included Vanessa Wruble, cofounder of The Women's March, Jessica Scheller and Jaquie Algee of Women's March Chicago, Lindsey Kanaly and Sacia Fowler of Women's March Oklahoma, Penelope Chester of Women's March Canada among others across the nation.

The leaders came together after the January 2017 women's marches to consolidate political power in America, focused at first on women's electoral power in the midterms.

Notably absent from the coalition was a break-off group, Women's March Incorporated, that consisted of some of the women who had been spokespeople for the Women's March On Washington 2017. In light of anti-semitism charges on Women's March Incorporated, March On publicly distanced themselves and other affiliate organizations from the group.

In January 2024, March On was dissolved and rebranded as Future Coalition.

== Leadership ==
In May 2023, Corryn Grace Freeman took over as executive director of the organization.
