= Berlioz (musician) =

- Also known as: Ted Jasper
- Born: Jasper Edward Attlee; Cape Town, Western Cape, South Africa
- Genres: Jazz house
- Occupations: Musician, DJ, music producer
- Spouse: Joycelyn
- Website: berliozmusic.com

Berlioz (stylized as berlioz), formerly Ted Jasper, is a British jazz house musician and DJ.

== Early life and career ==
Berlioz was born Jasper Edward Attlee in Cape Town, South Africa. After leaving Cape Town at just six months old, Berlioz grew up in Cornwall, England.

In 2017, Berlioz began his music career under the pseudonym Ted Jasper. He later chose to abandon the name of Ted Jasper after feeling too attached to it and wishing to construct a new musical project with its own identity. Berlioz's stage name originated not from the French composer Hector Berlioz but from a character in the 1970 Disney animated film The Aristocats.

In 2023, Berlioz released the EP jazz is for ordinary people.

In 2024, he released his debut album open this wall which Rolling Stone called "a record that is simultaneously smooth and palatable but also boundary-pushing and inventive." The album's title comes from the Toni Morrison novel Jazz.

== Personal life ==
Berlioz's wife Joycelyn is credited on his music and works as his co-producer, assisting him with mixing and arrangement of music.

Berlioz's childhood friend, South London based graphic designer Pat Thomas, creates the artwork for his music and album releases.

== Critical reception ==
In 2024, The Guardian wrote that Berlioz had "a streaming audience so huge he’s by some metrics the UK’s most-listened to jazz act."

Phoenix New Times said in a review of a 2025 Phoenix, Arizona live Berlioz show, "The producer lit up the crowd at Saturday's show with his signature jazz/house music fusion."

== Studio albums ==
List of studio albums, with selected details, chart positions and certifications
Title	Details	Peak chart positions
Title	Details	SCO
Open This Wall	Released: 12 July 2024; Label: Self released; Format: CD, vinyl, digital download	60
