= Durry (band) =

American rock band

- Durry performing in 2022

Background information
- Origin: Burnsville, Minnesota
- Genre: Indie rock
- Years active: 2020–present
- Members: Austin Durry; Taryn Durry
- Website: durrymusic.com

Durry is an American indie rock band from Burnsville, Minnesota formed in 2020, who first gained wide attention for going viral with their song "Who's Laughing Now" in September 2021.

== History ==
The band was formed by brother-sister duo Austin Durry and Taryn Durry in 2020, after Austin and his wife Ashley moved into his parents' basement apartment in the suburbs of Minneapolis in 2020 during COVID. Austin was previously in the band Coyote Kid for 12 years, which had some limited success, and left Austin wondering if he had wasted his youth on his musical dreams. A seven-year age gap between Austin and Taryn meant they had not been especially close growing up, but she became a sounding board for musical ideas he was doing at home, and the band sprang from that collaboration. A Kickstarter campaign in May 2021 helped fund a planned EP. After a demo of their song "Who's Laughing Now" suddenly took off on TikTok in September 2021, they quickly finished the recording to capitalize on the viral attention. Praise also came from Fred Durst of Limp Bizkit. By January 2022, the band had over 1 million streams on Spotify.

The band put out their first songs online in 2021, and also started playing some live shows. For live shows, the band plays as a four piece with Austin's wife Ashley on bass and Dane Hoppe on drums.

The band's first full-length album, Suburban Legend, released on September 8, 2023.

Durry's second album This Movie Sucks released on June 27, 2025.

== Band members ==
Current members

- Austin Durry – vocals, guitars, production (2020–present)
- Taryn Durry – vocals, guitars, keyboards (2020–present)

Touring members

- Ashley Durry – bass (2021–present)
- Dane Hoppe – drums (2021–present)

== Discography ==
=== Albums ===
- Suburban Legend (2023)
- This Movie Sucks (2025)

=== Singles ===
- Who's Laughing Now? (2021)
- This Movie Sucks (2025)
- More Dumb (2025)
- idk i just work here (2025)
- Dead Media (2025)
