= List of neighborhoods in Harlem =

This is a list of all neighborhoods in the section of Harlem, in the New York City borough of Manhattan.

== Central Harlem ==
- Astor Row
- Strivers' Row
- Le Petit Senegal

== East Harlem ==
- Spanish Harlem

== West Harlem ==
- Hamilton Heights
- Manhattanville
- Morningside Heights
- Sugar Hill, Manhattan
