= She's American =

Single by The 1975

from the album I Like It When You Sleep, for You Are So Beautiful yet So Unaware of It
- Released: 4 November 2016
- Genre: Funk; pop; synth-pop
- Length: 4:30
- Label: Dirty Hit; Polydor
- Songwriters: Matthew Healy; George Daniel; Adam Hann; Ross MacDonald
- Producers: Matthew Healy; George Daniel; Mike Crossey

The 1975 singles chronology
"A Change of Heart" (2016)	"She's American" (2016)	"Loving Someone" (2017)

"She's American" is a song by English band The 1975 from their second studio album, I Like It When You Sleep, for You Are So Beautiful yet So Unaware of It (2016). The song was written by Matty Healy, George Daniel, Adam Hann and Ross MacDonald. Mike Crossey handled the production alongside Daniel and Healy. The song was released on 4 November 2016 by Dirty Hit and Polydor Records as the sixth single from the album. Healy was inspired by the interplay between the British and Americans, creating a tongue-in-cheek song about the subtleties involved in a British rockstar courting an American woman. Containing a 1980s-style beat, futuristic synths and a saxophone solo, it is a retro funk, pop and synth-pop song with elements of disco, yacht rock and synth-funk.

The song's lyrics, which serve as a commentary on the cultural differences between the British and Americans, detail Healy's turbulent romance with an American woman who is attracted to things that he cannot understand. Upon release, "She's American" received generally positive reviews from contemporary music critics, who praised the lighthearted nature, hooks and production, with some deeming it a highlight from I Like It When You Sleep, for You Are So Beautiful yet So Unaware of It. The song reached number 176 on the UK Singles Chart, number 91 in Scotland and number 32 on the US Billboard Hot Rock & Alternative Songs chart. It was later certified silver in the United Kingdom by the British Phonographic Industry (BPI). An accompanying music video, featuring Healy dancing in front of a video screen, was filmed but ultimately not released.

== Background and development ==
"I think that one was very playful ... very tongue-in-cheek. But it's just based on the very kind of minute aspects of the interplay between kind of 'young British boy in rock band and American girl.' Yeah, it's a tale as old as time, it's just another one of those songs."

— Healy, on the meaning of "She's American".

In an interview with Joe Lynch of Billboard, The 1975's lead singer Matty Healy described "She's American" as "playful". When asked about a line in the song that refers to fixing his teeth and if it was a cultural difference between the Americans and the British, the singer said the track was: "Not a snarling takedown but it's about being in an English rock band and the nuances of the courting process between American girls and British boys. Teeth are a big currency in America." Healy was also asked about the line by Chris DeVille of Stereogum, telling the interviewer: "British people don't have bad teeth, but ['She's American'] is more about being British than it is about girls being American." On 4 November 2016, "She's American" was released by Dirty Hit and Polydor Records as the sixth single from I Like It When You Sleep, for You Are So Beautiful yet So Unaware of It.

== Music and lyrics ==
"She's American"
A 27-second sample of the chorus of "She's American", showcasing the song's 1980s-style beat, futuristic synths and saxophone solo as Healy highlights the differences between himself and his American partner.

Musically, "She's American" is a funk, pop and synth-pop song with a length of four minutes and thirty seconds (4:30). The song was written by The 1975 members George Daniel, Healy, Adam Hann and Ross MacDonald, while the former two handled the production alongside Mike Crossey. The retro instrumentation is composed of a 1980s-style beat, "gooey" futuristic synths, "tinny" rhythm guitars, funk guitar licks, a funk bass, a slap-bass "fizz", a subtle saxophone solo, "radiant" harmonies and twitching "spindly" guitar lines. The track also incorporates elements of disco, yacht rock and synth-funk.

Lyrically, "She's American" is a commentary on cultural differences between the British and Americans. The song describes being involved with a romantic interest while not making the relationship official, with Healy warning of mistaking the moment with falling in love with the girl. The track's intro contains a 1980s live-drum sound and opens with the couplet: "Big town, synthetic apparitions of not being lonely." The verses, which contain a "serpentine" guitar line, feature "dramatic" lyrics dealing with topical subjects such as painkillers, guns ("And I think she's got a gun divinely decreed and custom made") and "other American appetites", according to Jonathan Wroble of Slant Magazine. In the chorus, the singer details the cultural differences between himself and his American partner, who is attracted to things he cannot understand, singing: "If she likes it cos we just don't eat / And we're socially relevant, she's American".

== Reception ==
Deeming "She's American" the best song on I Like It When You Sleep, for You Are So Beautiful yet So Unaware of It, Edwin McFee of Hot Press compared it to a John Hughes soundtrack and said the track "will ensure [The 1975] keep[s] selling out arenas around the world". The Verge writer Jamieson Cox praised the song's hooks and deemed it an album highlight. Writing for idobi, Dana Reandelar declared the track as her favourite song from the record and praised its 1980s-style beat, "catchy" verses and hooks. The Red & Black's Emma Korstanje commended the "unforgettable [and] catchy" hook of "She's American". Alan Sculley of the Sarasota Herald-Tribune wrote that the song contains an "immediacy" that "draw[s] one into the album and prompt[s] further listens". Following the release of I Like It When You Sleep, for You Are So Beautiful yet So Unaware of It, Hyperallergic writer Lucas Fagen expressed his desire to see the band release it as a single.

Laura Snapes of Pitchfork used "She's American" as an example of the record's "enormous[ly] fun" sound and praised Healy's "clenched-fist" vocals. Wroble highlighted the "shimmering" chorus, saying the song will "transport [the listener] instantly to a shopping mall", and also commended the "catchy" lyrics of the verses. The Line of Best Fit writer Grant Rindner praised the production's "underlying solemnity" and wrote that while the song is a "difficult act to pull off", Healy is successful in "sell[ing] both lines". Rhian Daly of NME commended Hann's "spidery" guitar work, calling the track an "ode to a girl across the pond". The Irish Times' Lauren Murphy compared the incorporation of yacht rock in "She's American" to the works of Phil Collins and Steely Dan.

Renowned for Sound writer Jessica Thomas commended the "vibrancy" of "She's American", while The A.V. Club's Annie Zaleski called the song a "gauzy, synth-pop daydream" and Jessi Roti of the Chicago Tribune deemed the track an "art-funk confection". Writing for The Observer, Michael Hann described "She's American" as a "sharp pop song about being an Englishman desired by American girls". In a mixed review, Patricia Guzman of The Harvard Crimson wrote that the song is not "necessarily unpleasant to listen to but lack[s] conviction", finding it too derivative of The 1975's previous songs. In his review of I Like It When You Sleep, for You Are So Beautiful yet So Unaware of It for The Independent, Andy Gill was ambivalent toward the first half of the album, including "She's American", deeming it "brittle". In The 1975's native United Kingdom, "She's American" peaked at number 176 on the UK Singles Chart and number 91 in Scotland, and was later certified silver by the British Phonographic Industry (BPI), denoting sales of over 200,000 units in the UK. In the United States, the song peaked at number 32 on the US Billboard Hot Rock & Alternative Songs chart.

== Cancelled music video ==
An accompanying music video was expected to be released on Christmas in 2016. However, following the 2016 US presidential election results, the band's manager, Jamie Oborne, revealed that a visual for fellow album track "Loving Someone" would be released beforehand. Numerous teaser clips for the "She's American" video were released, including footage from the visual and behind-the-scenes photos from the crew who worked on the shoot. The footage included Healy dancing with a group of women holding machine guns in front of a video screen. When asked about the visual's planned debut date on Twitter, Oborne revealed that it would likely not be released. On 22 December 2018, Healy tweeted an American flag emoji followed by a second post containing a video of him working on choreography while the song plays in the background. Despite the speculation of a potential debut, the video was not released.

== Credits and personnel ==
Credits adapted from I Like It When You Sleep, for You Are So Beautiful yet So Unaware of It album liner notes.

- Matthew Healy – composer, producer, electric guitar, vocals, background vocals
- George Daniel – composer, producer, programming, synthesizer programming, drums, keyboards, synthesizer, percussion
- Adam Hann – composer, electric guitar
- Ross MacDonald – composer, bass guitar
- Mike Crossey – producer, programming, mixer
- John Waugh – saxophone
- Jonathan Gilmore – recording engineer
- Chris Gehringer – mastering engineer

== Charts ==
Chart performance for "She's American"
Chart (2016)	Peak position
UK Singles (OCC)	176
Scottish Singles Sales (Official Charts)	91
US Hot Rock & Alternative Songs (Billboard)	32

== Certifications ==
Certifications and sales for "She's American"
Region	Certification	Certified units/sales
United Kingdom (BPI)	Silver	200,000^{‡}
^{‡} Sales+streaming figures based on certification alone.

== See also ==
- The 1975 discography
- List of songs by Matty Healy
