= Facedown EP =

Facedown

EP by the 1975
- Released: 6 August 2012
- Genres: Art rock; indie pop; ambient pop
- Length: 14:13
- Labels: Dirty Hit; Interscope
- Producers: Jamie Ellis; Ian Grimble; The 1975

The 1975 chronology
Facedown (2012)	Sex (2012)

Singles from Facedown EP
- 1. "The City" Released: 9 August 2012

Facedown is the debut extended play (EP) by English band The 1975. It was released on 6 August 2012 by Dirty Hit and Interscope. The band produced the EP alongside Jamie Ellis and Ian Grimble. An art rock, indie pop and ambient pop record, it incorporates a diverse range of sounds including indie rock, electronica, dance-pop, gothic and emo.

== Background ==
In January 2012, The 1975 was formed by lead singer Matty Healy, drummer George Daniel, guitarist Adam Hann and bassist Ross MacDonald, who had played music together since 2002. After being rejected by all major record labels, artist manager Jamie Osborne discovered the band and signed them to his label Dirty Hit. The 1975 began a process of releasing three extended plays (EP) leading to their debut album.

== Composition ==
Musically, Facedown is composed in the styles of art rock, indie pop and ambient pop, which Bevis Man of DIY described as "sitting somewhere between the bleak art rock of Joy Division and the indie-pop that might well find its way onto the playlists of mainstream radio". The EP opens with the ballad "Facedown", an ambient torch song. Its production contains "angelic" whispers, twinkling chimes, "icy" and "wintry" bells, fragmented drum beats, a "shadowy" synth line, swirling and "shimmering" ambient guitars, "gloomy" vocals, pianos and low, "patient" and "synth-heavy" harmonics. Man said the track "echoes of the wintry feel" of Sigur Rós, while Jared Cohen of The Journal described the song as "Bon Iver on synths", stating it is evocative of the xx and M83. The following track, "The City", is an upbeat indie rock, electronica and dance-pop song. Composed of "maxed out" drum machines, "buzzing" keyboards and gated percussion, the track's lyrics revolve around the theme of urban loneliness, with Healy singing: "If you wanna find love then you know where the city is". Ian Cohen of Pitchfork said the song "confidently [thumps] like the best Big Pink singles do", while American Songwriter's Robert Crawford remarked that it "sounded like anthemic British indie-rock filtered through the neon disco ball of M83's dance-pop".

The third song on Facedown, "Antichrist", was described by Crawford as dark and stoic, a sentiment echoed by Tom Connick of NME, who deemed it "doomy, gloomy and powerful". Containing gothic influences, Consequence's Samantha Small said the track's production was akin to "the rise and fall of a wave", built on a hard, "crashing" drum beat, synths, "glittering" guitars and a "powerful" synth organ. Thematically, the song focuses on topics such as such as atheism, enlightenment and the singer's relationship with his mother. The lyrics, which the Alternative Press staff opined "read like a poem", are composed entirely by Healy and discuss his inability to believe in "something he cannot see", instead choosing to believe in love, singing: "Well, criminals and liars, keep him in your cell as a privilege of mine / Well, I love the house that we live in, I love you all too much". The EP's fourth and final song, "Woman", is a downbeat, quiet and stripped-back ballad. A torch song, its production is devoid of drums, consisting of merely Healy's vocals, "moody" soundscapes, atmospheric synths, simple, "gently" chiming guitar reverb and emo melodies. Lyrically, the song recounts an experience Healy had with a prostitute in Belfast when he was 17 years old, singing that he "fell in love with [her] a little bit" but did not solicit her services.

== Release and reception ==
=== Reception ===
Upon release, Facedown received generally mixed reviews from contemporary music critics, who praised the EP's stylistic diversity but described it as "schizophrenic" and failing to define the 1975's musical identity. Awarding the EP a score of 6.2-out-of-10, Ian Cohen deemed "The City" a highlight and praised the 1975's theatrics. However, the reviewer was critical of the record's uneven presentation and over-reliance on torch songs, ultimately calling it "a muddle, but a promising one". Man gave Facedown three-out-of-five stars, calling it "an inconsistent if beguiling listen" that is ultimately "an effort worth celebrating". He gave specific praise to "Antichrist", stating it contains a sense of urgency and direction not present on the record's other tracks, while criticising the lack of a cohesive sound. In his four-out-of-five star review, Jared Cohen viewed the EP's lack of cohesion in a positive light, stating it showcased the band's ability to produce a variety of styles. He praised the songwriting and production value, declaring it "a beautiful little EP".

=== Release and promotion ===
Facedown was released on 6 August 2012 by Dirty Hit and Interscope. On 9 August, "The City" was released as the EP's lead single. To promote the record, The 1975 released a series of black and white music videos directed by James Booth. Working with Booth, the band sought to create simplistic videos on a "really tiny budget" that worked together to form a series, seeking to complement the EP as a whole. Speaking on their collaboration, Booth said The 1975 "really care about their aesthetic and see their videos as an important part of this". "Facedown" was released on 23 June 2012 as the first visual. "The City", released on 18 July.

== Track listing ==
Facedown
No.	Title	Writer(s)	Producer(s)	Length
1.	"Facedown"	Matthew Healy; George Daniel; Adam Hann; Ross MacDonald	Jamie Ellis; The 1975	2:49
2.	"The City"	Healy; Daniel; Hann; MacDonald	The 1975; Ian Grimble	3:41
3.	"Antichrist"	Healy	Grimble; The 1975	4:43
4.	"Woman"	Healy	The 1975	3:02
Total length:				14:13

== See also ==
- The 1975 discography
- List of songs by Matty Healy
