= Television Romance =

Song by Pale Waves

- "Television Romance"/"There's a Honey" double A-side single

Single by Pale Waves

from the album My Mind Makes Noises
- Released: 16 August 2017
- Recorded: 2017
- Genre: Indie pop
- Length: 3:25
- Label: Dirty Hit
- Songwriters: Heather Baron-Gracie; Ciara Doran
- Producers: Matty Healy; George Daniel

Pale Waves singles chronology
"There's a Honey" (2017)	"Television Romance" (2017)	"New Year's Eve" (2017)

Music video
- "Television Romance" on YouTube

"Television Romance" is a song by the English indie pop band Pale Waves, released on 16 August 2017 to promote their debut album, My Mind Makes Noises (2018). The song, written by Heather Baron-Gracie and Ciara Doran and produced by Matty Healy and George Daniel of the 1975, was inspired by an incident in which Baron-Gracie had to bluntly rebuff a hopeful suitor who was oblivious to her disinterest. The band also released a video for the song; directed by Healy and Samuel Burgess-Johnson, it features the band performing the song in a Manchester flat.

On 10 November 2017, "Television Romance" was re-released with the band's "There's a Honey" as a double A-side single by Dirty Hit. The single received largely positive reviews from music critics, with many applauding the band's sound and the song's catchiness (although some criticism was aimed at the song's similarity to the band's previous single, "There's a Honey"). At the end of 2017, Marie Claire named the single one of the best songs of the year, and upon its release as a physical single, "Television Romance" debuted at number 83 on the Scottish Singles Chart and at number 2 on the UK Vinyl Singles and UK Singles Sales Charts.

== Composition ==
=== Background ===
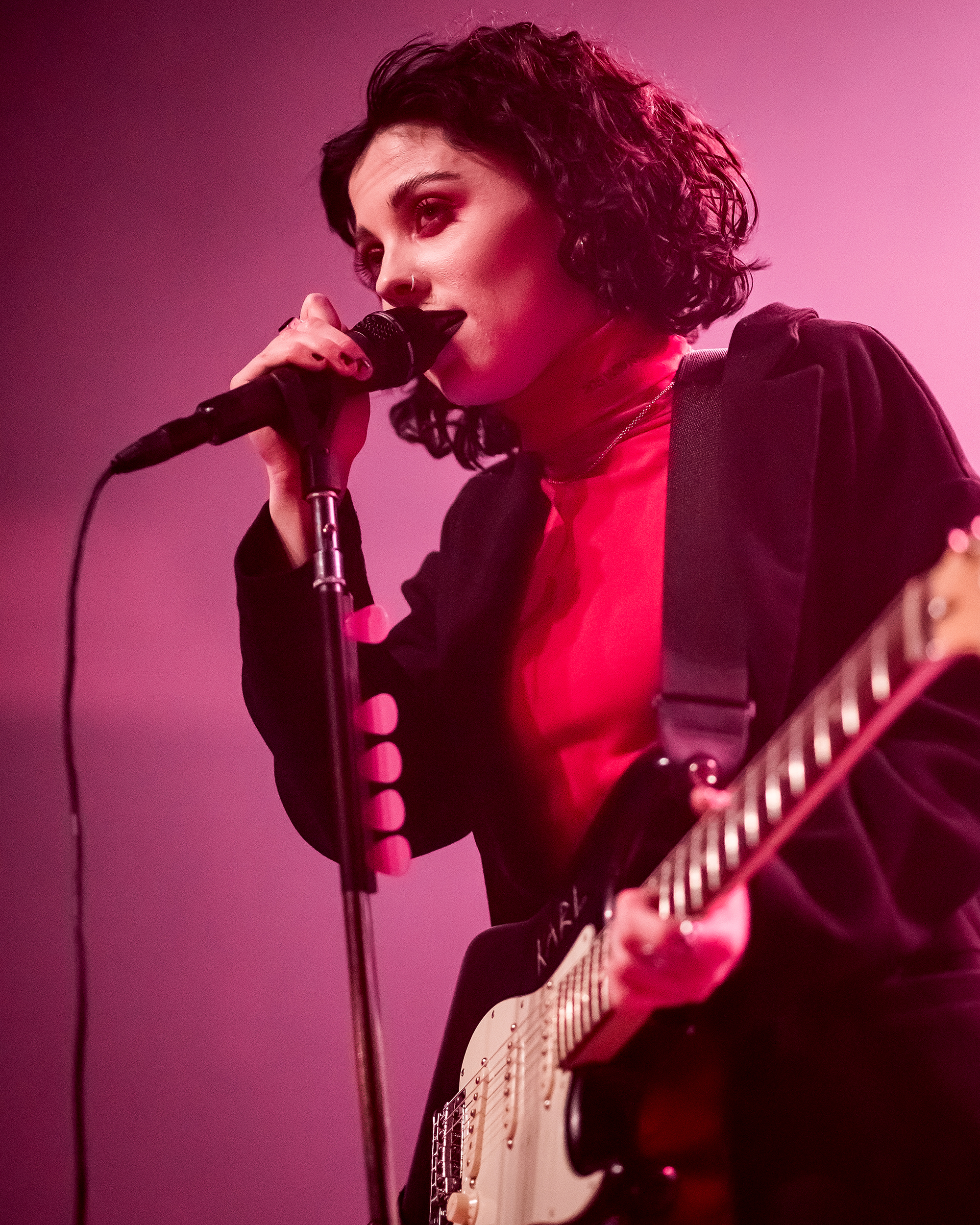
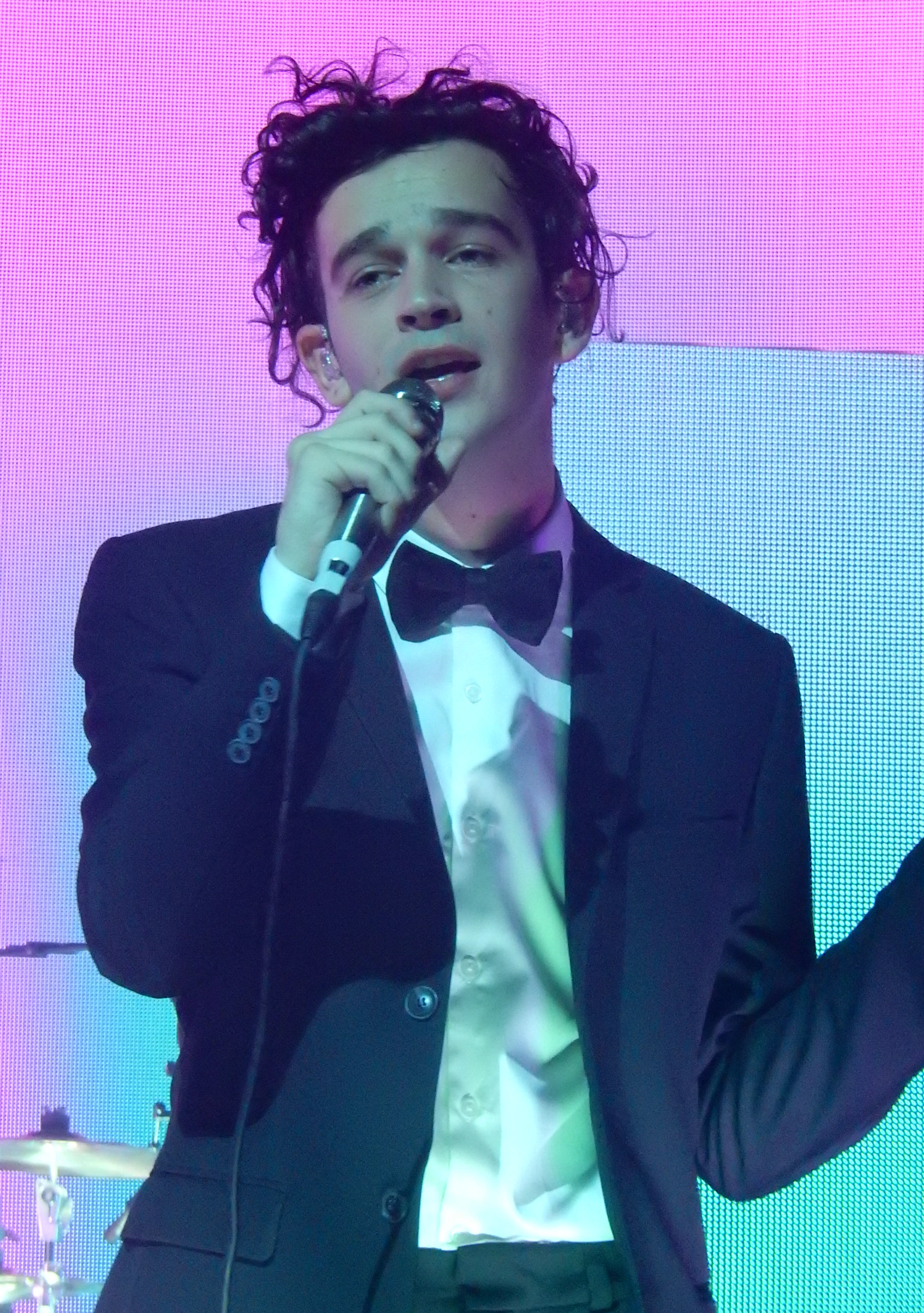
"Television Romance" was co-written by Heather Baron-Gracie (left) and Ciara Doran; it was produced by the 1975's Matty Healy (right) and George Daniel.

"Television Romance" was written in 2016 by Pale Waves members Ciara Doran and Heather Baron-Gracie after a tour with the English indie pop band Sundara Karma, and in an interview with NME, Baron-Gracie explained that during this time, the band members were going through a period of self-doubt: "We got off that tour, and we’re like, 'Right, we can’t write.' We were so sad. … [But] then we came out with one of our best songs." According to Baron-Gracie, she and Doran came up with the title "Television Romance" while working on a university project: "There was this activity we were asked to do [for a class]. We cut up all these words and had to find a title within these words. I found television and romance. We said we were going to make it into a song, and we did."

Lyrically, "Television Romance" was inspired by an interaction Baron-Gracie had had with an admirer who was oblivious to her disinterest: "['Television Romance'] is about a night we had … [And] somebody was just constantly coming onto me, and I was like, 'No, please stop! Because one, I don’t want this, and two, I’m not really into you.' And they just wouldn’t stop and I was like, 'Is it not obvious that I don’t like you back?'" In a discussion with Sarah Kidd of Ambient Light, Baron-Gracie said, "That happens a lot in this day and age where people just don’t listen and just keep trying to say something that obviously isn’t the same for the other person." In the same interview, Baron-Gracie noted that some listeners incorrectly assume that "Television Romance" is a love song, even though "it’s a rejection song ... It’s looking at romance in a negative manner."

When it was being written, "Television Romance" went through various iterations—so many that the band began to question what exactly it "want[ed] to be". The final version of the song was produced by Matthew Healy and George Daniel of the 1975, and it was recorded in Healy's attic in 2017. Healy first expressed interest in producing the single after his manager, Jamie Oborne (who managed both the 1975 and Pale Waves), played him a demo of "Television Romance" and "There's a Honey". "Matty said he wished that 'Television Romance' was his song", Doran explained to the BBC, "so he wanted to have some involvement." Doran credits Healy and Daniel with "[taking] what [Pale Waves] had and [making] it sonically bigger", That said, when discussing how much of an impact Healy had on the band's sound, Baron-Gracie told NME that "we're different bands and different people. [Healy and the 1975] are our friends, and we’re really close to them but we’re both doing our own thing right now."

=== Music and lyrics ===
A 20-second sample of "Television Romance" that demonstrates the song's sonic nature. This style has been compared to that of the 1975.

Musically, "Television Romance" is an indie pop song in the key of E major that is played at a tempo of 115 beats per minute. Described as "dream pop nostalgia", "Television Romance" opens with a "swirling guitar riff", and "high-pitched vocals, [all] backed by sugar-sweet synths". This specific soundscape has often been compared to music of the 1975 (NME, for instance, referred to the song as having "1975-like staccato verses") Regarding these comparisons, Baron-Gracie told Nylon magazine: "I guess people just hear poppy guitars these days and think, 'The 1975,' because they're the most relevant band at the moment, and they're so big people are automatically inclined to compare." While analysing the lyrics to "Television Romance", Euphoria magazine wrote that they are "dripping with solitude and teen angst as it is blooming with confidence".

When it came time to include "Television Romance" on the band's debut studio album, My Mind Makes Noises, the members of Pale Waves decided to remix both this song and their debut single "There's a Honey". "When we were listening back to [original mixes of 'There's a Honey' and 'Television Romance'] it was pretty clear that we had to re-record them," Baron-Gracie explained in a feature with Ones to Watch. "We wanted it to sound like they were all recorded at the same time in the same studio and having the [original versions] on the album just wouldn't have worked." Ciara Doran and Jonathan Gilmore (the latter of whom produced the band's debut album) handled remixing duties.

== Music video ==
A still from the "Television Romance" music video. The flat in which the band performs was owned by a 92 year old woman, whose belongings were also featured in the video.

The music video for "Television Romance" was co-directed by Samuel Burgess-Johnson and Matty Healy, with the latter making his directorial debut. It was released on 18 September 2017 and features the band performing the song in the living room of a residence at a tower block. The video was filmed in a block of flats in Ashton-under-Lyne, Greater Manchester, near where the band's first practice space had been located. Regarding the location, Doran explained: "Everyone wanted [the video] to be Manchester-based, because it was important to us". The particular flat used in the video was owned by a 92-year-old woman. "She had no clue what was going on but she was loving it", Healy noted in an interview with NME. As of November 2026, the video has been viewed over 18.2 million times on YouTube.

Shahlin Graves of Coup de Main commented on how Baron-Gracie adds character to the video, writing "Heather Baron-Gracie, queen of iconic eye-rolls – long may you reign." Brittany Vincent of Alternative Press wrote positively of the video, describing it as both "low-key" and "very soothing". On 17 January it was announced that the music video was nominated for Best Video at the NME Awards 2018. The winner was revealed at the ceremony at London's O2 Academy Brixton on 14 February, with the band losing out to The Big Moon with their video for "Sucker".

== Release and critical reception ==
=== Commercial release ===
The song was originally released on 16 August 2017 as a download and made available on streaming services the same day. It was re-released on 10 November 2017 as a 7" double A-side single with the band's debut single "There's a Honey", pressed on a limited edition white vinyl. Following its release, the "Television Romance"/"There's a Honey" double A-side debuted at number 83 on the Scottish Singles Chart, and at number 2 on the UK Vinyl Singles and UK Singles Sales Charts. As of November 2026, "Television Romance" has been streamed 25.4 million times on Spotify.

=== Critical reviews ===
Upon its release, "Television Romance" received positive reviews from music critics. Thomas Smith, writing for NME, called the song "a shimmering, summer-tinged indie banger". In particular, he applauded "the song’s heavenly chorus", which "allows the Manchester quartet to elevate into a league of their own". Clash writer Robin Murray called the song "a sugar-sweet ear-worm of a track". She further described it as "infectious of chorus and glistening of production". Andy Von Pip of the online music blog, The VPME, praised the track, naming it their track of the day on 17 August 2017. Von Pip wrote that the song was a "lovingly crafted slice of slick but heartfelt indie, one that you could imagine being featured in a John Hughes montage". Von Pip also wrote highly of the "melancholic winsome appeal of Heather Baron-Gracie's fragile vocal". In a review of the band's debut album, My Mind Makes Noises, Emily Mackay of The Guardian, described the song as "monstrously addictive", and "all glistening 80s pop muscle and deadpan delivery". Marie Claire later named "Television Romance" one of the "Best Songs of 2017", ranking it at number 14.

Limited criticism was directed at the song for its similarities to the band's previous single, "There's a Honey". Von Pip, for instance, wrote: "['Television Romance' is] the follow up to their sublime official debut single for Dirty Hit Records 'There’s A Honey' and to be honest it isn't a million miles away from that track, indeed there are points in the chorus that sound like it's actually going to morph into said debut". Heather Baron-Gracie addressed this criticism on 5 December 2017 via her official Twitter account, saying: "If our songs sound ‘similar’ it's because we’re the same band".

=== Year-end lists ===
Publication	Rank	Ref.
Marie Claire's Best Songs of 2017	14	

== Track listing ==
All music is composed by Heather Baron-Gracie and Ciara Doran.

Download, Streaming
No.	Title	Length
1.	"Television Romance"	3:25

7" (AA re-release)
No.	Title	Length
1.	"Television Romance"	3:25
2.	"There's a Honey"	3:47
Total length:		7:12

== Personnel ==
Credits adapted from the liner notes of My Mind Makes Noises.

Pale Waves

- Heather Baron-Gracie – vocals, guitar
- Ciara Doran – drums, synthesizers, programming
- Hugo Silvani – guitar
- Charlie Wood – bass guitar

Additional musicians

- Jonathan Gilmore – programming

Technical

- George Daniel – production
- Matthew Healy – production
- Jonathan Gilmore – additional production
- Ciara Doran – additional production
- Joseph Rodgers – engineering
- Mark "Spike" Stent – mixing
- Robin Schmidt – mastering

== Charts ==
=== Weekly charts ===
Weekly chart performance for "Television Romance"/"There's a Honey"
Chart (2017)	Peak position
Scotland (OCC)	83
UK Physical Sales Chart (OCC)	2
UK Vinyl Chart (OCC)	2

== Release history ==
Release history and formats for "Television Romance"
Country	Date	Format	Label	Catalog no.	Ref.
Various	16 August 2017	Digital download	Dirty Hit	—N/a	
Various	10 November 2017	45"	Dirty Hit	DH00258	

== In other media ==
"Television Romance" is prominently featured in Ken Ninomiya's 2019 film Chiwawa during a scene in which the titular character goes viral on Instagram. In an interview with Billboard Japan, Ninomiya explained he was drawn to the band because of the unique way they melded "nostalgia and modernity".
