= Loving Someone =

Single by The 1975

from the album I Like It When You Sleep, for You Are So Beautiful yet So Unaware of It
- B-side: "Somebody Else"
- Released: 3 February 2017
- Genre: R&B
- Length: 4:20
- Label: Dirty Hit; Polydor Records
- Songwriters: Matthew Healy; George Daniel; Adam Hann; Ross MacDonald
- Producers: Matthew Healy; George Daniel; Mike Crossey

The 1975 singles chronology
"She's American" (2016)	"Loving Someone" (2017)	"By Your Side" (2017)

Alternative cover
- The 7-inch version of the single featuring the rainbow flag.

Audio video
- "Loving Someone" on YouTube

"Loving Someone" is a song by English band The 1975 from their second studio album, I Like It When You Sleep, for You Are So Beautiful yet So Unaware of It (2016). The song was written by Matty Healy, George Daniel, Adam Hann and Ross MacDonald. Mike Crossey handled the production alongside Daniel and Healy. It was released on 3 February 2017 by Dirty Hit and Polydor Records as the seventh and final single from the album. Daniel developed the song's production and title during a jam session, using a chopped vocal stem, while Healy created the lyrics after completing the band's track "Paris".

An R&B song, "Loving Someone" has an electronic production that incorporates elements of spoken word, folktronica and Brit soul. Healy sings and raps the lyrics, which serve as a commentary centred on youth culture, in a mockney style. The song implores listeners to critically think about fame while focusing on themes of conditional love and homophobia. Upon release, the song received generally positive reviews from contemporary music critics. Reviewers highlighted its production quality and dark humour.

An accompanying music video, filmed live at the O2 Arena, was released on 20 January 2017. The visual features footage of the band performing, close-ups of the individual members and fans in the crowd. To promote "Loving Someone", The 1975 performed the song on tour and at various music festivals, including the Bunbury Music Festival and the Hangout Music Festival. Healy dedicated the song to the LGBT community as well as black, Muslim and liberal Americans. The singer gave several speeches prior to the band's performances, including ones criticising Brexit and the 2016 US presidential election results. Healy was involved in a controversial kiss with a male fan in Dubai during a performance of the song, prompting him to apologise for endangering the individual due to the strict anti-LGBTQ laws in the United Arab Emirates.

== Background and development ==
In an interview with Coup de Main, The 1975's drummer and producer George Daniel told Shahlin Graves that "Loving Someone" went through several iterations. He allegedly began creating the song by "just messing around" as if he were attempting to write a piece of melody. The producer used an old stem of lead singer Matty Healy's voice and chopped up the syllables before inputting the notes, a process he compared to "essentially just jamming using stems". Daniel continued to drag and rhythmically chop the stem, ensuring it was developed in the proper key. Once a succinct part was created thereafter, he combined it with a "really simple melody" that he wanted before finding the proper notes and beginning work on the lyrics. There were no words in the syllables used in the finalised stem, but phonetically the sample sounded like the phrase "loving someone", so The 1975 developed the lyrics around that. Speaking with Dork's Ali Shutler, Healy revealed that "Loving Someone" was inspired by the line "Hey kids, we’re all just the same. What a shame", from fellow album track "Paris". The singer said that the former song helped create "the whole glue of the knowledge of us all being a witness to this madness".

== Music and lyrics ==
"Loving Someone"
A 26-second sample of "Loving Someone", showcasing the song's insistent drum beat, high-pitched vocal refrain and Healy's mixture of singing and rapping in a mockney style.

Musically, "Loving Someone" is an R&B song with a length of four minutes and twenty seconds (4:20). The song was written by band members Daniel, Healy, Adam Hann and Ross MacDonald, while the production was handled by the former two alongside Mike Crossey. The track's electronic production is composed of an insistent drum beat, "floating" synthesisers and influences of spoken word, folktronica and Brit soul. Healy's vocal delivery is a mixture of singing and rapping in a mockney style.

"Loving Someone" is both a social and political commentary that focuses on modern youth culture, using dark humour to explore themes of conditional love and homophobia. The song begins with a high-pitched voice singing the refrain: "You should be loving someone / Yeah, you should be loving someone." Healy urges the listener to think critically about fame while deriding the integrity of celebrities for lacking meaningfulness, as well as an obsession with using sex to sell. Elsewhere, Healy quotes French Marxist situationist Guy Debord when singing "I'm the Greek economy of cashing intellectual cheques", referencing the Greek economic crash while comparing it to how he is not as smart as he presents himself to be.

== Release and reception ==
"Loving Someone" was officially released by Dirty Hit and Polydor Records as the seventh and final single from I Like It When You Sleep, for You Are So Beautiful yet So Unaware of It, added to BBC Radio 1's C List on 3 February 2017. 1000 physical vinyl singles were given to ticket holders as compensation for a cancelled New Slang performance, containing fellow album track "Somebody Else" as the B-side. Deeming "Loving Someone" the best song on the album, Rachel Hunt of The Diamondback praised the song's "catchy" rhythm, chorus, "witty" lines and dark humour. Euphoria Magazine writer Celia Cummiskey called the song a natural sonic progression from The 1975's "M.O.N.E.Y." Writing for Drowned in Sound, Sean Adams called the track "incredible" and said it "borrows a bit of Alt-J's slumber-pop template and does a bit of rummaging through Prince's ['Sign o' the Times'] but mangles it with [t]he Avalanches or Air's bittersweet cut up hooks". Rolling Stone's Jon Dolan praised the song's "buoyancy" and "melodic sheen", writing that it creates "an enjoyable balance of desire and distraction". Paste ranked the song at number 18 on their list of The 1975's essential songs, with Jarod Johnson II feeling its high-pitched vocal refrains serve to create a "stark" tension that mirrors societal pressure to find a partner and "complete" oneself.

== Promotion ==
The 1975 have promoted "Loving Someone" as an LGBT "anthem", with Healy saying: "'Loving Someone', has become a bit of an anthem for some people in that community." While on tour in the US, the band performed the song as a tribute to the victims of the 2016 Orlando nightclub shooting. The screen and blocks which light up with various colours, images and patterns during their performance were lit with the colours of the rainbow. Following the 2016 US presidential election results, The 1975's manager, Jamie Osborn, revealed that a music video for "Loving Someone" would be released in place of "She's American". At a concert in Fairfax in November 2016, Healy introduced the track with a speech addressing the 2016 US election results. He expressed his solidarity with black, Muslim and gay Americans, saying that the band loves the US and do not stand for the bigotry and racism espoused by then-president elect Donald Trump's supporters.

On the opening night of The 1975's concert at the O2 Arena in December 2016, Healy introduced "Loving Someone" with a speech decrying the "regressive ideals" of Brexit and US presidential elections for stifling "young progressive voices", saying: "If we are the liberals, if we are the left, if we are the young, the black, the Muslim, the gay, whatever we are, we have to understand that all of this shit, these paradigms of race and all this kind of stuff, it seems to make sense but that’s not really what it’s about" The music video for "Loving Someone" was released on 20 January 2017. The band uploaded the video during Trump's inauguration, posting the visual to Instagram while tagging him in the caption. It is a live video recorded during The 1975's performance at the O2 Arena. The visual begins with a rainbow flag "wash[ing]" over the room, representing the pride flag of the LGBTQ+ movement, before interspersing clips of The 1975 performing on stage, footage of fans in the crowd and closeup shots of the individual band members. In April 2017, The 1975 released a hoodie themed around the song in collaboration with the It Gets Better Project.

The 1975 performed "Loving Someone" at the Bunbury Music Festival in June 2017. A rainbow of colours lit up the tall walls of video screens behind the band and Healy dedicated the song to the people of Manchester and London. In May 2019, the band performed the track at the Hangout Music Festival in Gulf Shores, Alabama, where Healy spoke out against Alabama's controversial ban on abortions. Several audience members in the crowd became visibly upset during his speech, booing and throwing objects at The 1975. They were advised to consider quickly leaving Alabama, having been notified of a higher threat level due to it being an open carry state. Healy was furious and wrote "People" (2019) immediately after the event on their tour bus while travelling through Texas. In August 2019, the band performed "Loving Someone" in Dubai, where he kissed a male fan, defying strict anti-LGBTQ laws in the United Arab Emirates. As the stage background transformed into the gay pride flag, security guards at the venue attempted to pull The 1975 off the stage and sought to arrest him. Healy faced backlash from the incident on Twitter for endangering the fan since homosexual acts are illegal and can be punishable by fines and jail time. The singer admitted the incident was "irresponsible" but stood by his willingness to face punishment for his beliefs, saying: "I'm never going to not stand up for women. I'm not going to not stand up for gay people. I'm not going to not stand up for minorities."

== Track listing ==
Limited Edition 7" vinyl disc

1. "Loving Someone" – 4:20
2. "Somebody Else" – 5:48

== Credits and personnel ==
Credits adapted from I Like It When You Sleep, for You Are So Beautiful yet So Unaware of It album liner notes.

- Matthew Healy – composer, producer, vocals, background vocals
- George Daniel – composer, producer, programming, keyboards, synthesizer
- Adam Hann – composer
- Ross MacDonald – composer
- Mike Crossey – producer, programming, mixer
- Jonathan Gilmore – recording engineer
- Chris Gehringer – mastering engineer

== Certifications ==
Region	Certification	Certified units/sales
United Kingdom (BPI)	Silver	200,000^{‡}
^{‡} Sales+streaming figures based on certification alone.

== See also ==
- The 1975 discography
- List of songs by Matty Healy
