= Matty Healy =

English singer-songwriter (born 1989)

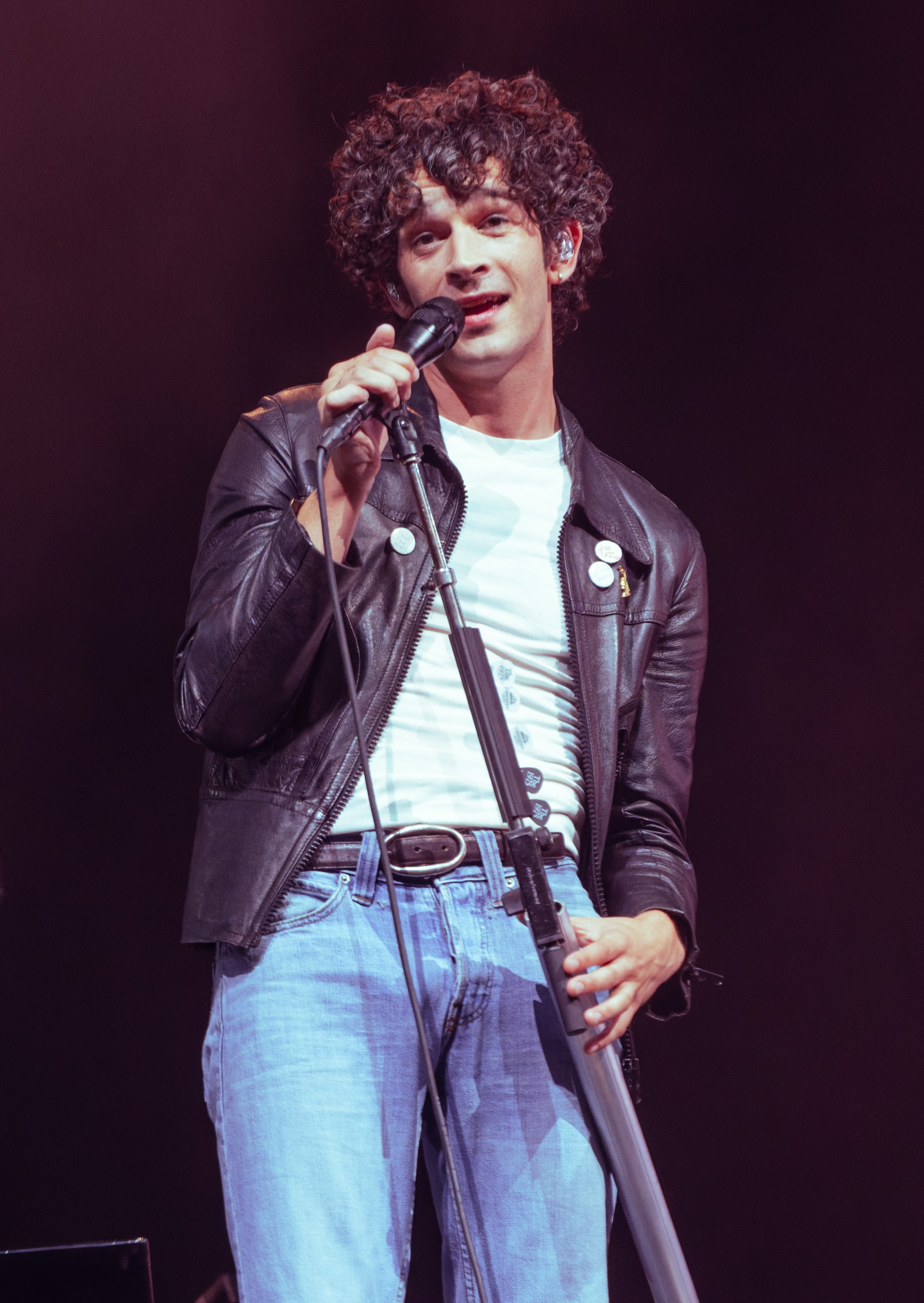
- Healy performing at the 2025 Glastonbury Festival
- Born: Matthew Timothy Healy; 8 April 1989 (age 37); London, England
- Other name: Truman Black
- Education: Academy of Contemporary Music
- Occupations: Singer-songwriter; musician; record producer; director
- Years active: 2002–present
- Works: Songs written and produced
- Spouse: Gabbriette (m. 2026)
- Parents: Denise Welch; Tim Healy
- Awards: Full list
- Musical career
- Origin: Alderley Edge, Cheshire, England
- Genres: Art pop; pop rock; folk; electropop; indie pop; alternative rock; experimental
- Instruments: Vocals; guitar; keyboards; drums
- Member of: The 1975
- Website: truman-black.com

Matthew Timothy Healy (born 8 April 1989) is an English singer-songwriter and record producer who is the lead vocalist and principal songwriter of the pop rock band The 1975. He is recognised for his lyricism, musical eclecticism, provocative onstage persona characterised as performance art, and influence on indie pop music.

Born in London and raised largely in the Cheshire village of Alderley Edge, Healy formed The 1975 in 2002 with his schoolmates at Wilmslow High School. After signing with independent record label Dirty Hit, the band released four extended plays before releasing their self-titled studio album in 2013. They followed it with I Like It When You Sleep, for You Are So Beautiful yet So Unaware of It (2016), A Brief Inquiry into Online Relationships (2018), Notes on a Conditional Form (2020) and Being Funny in a Foreign Language (2022). Each of their studio albums reached number one on the UK Albums Chart and charted on the Billboard 200, garnering critical praise and appearing in numerous publications' year-end and decade-end lists.

A vocal advocate for LGBTQ rights and climate change mitigation, Healy's songs and performances also deal with themes including internet culture, masculinity, the social and political milieu as well as his personal life and relationships. He has been described as a "spokesperson for the millennial generation" by Rolling Stone, "the enfant terrible of pop-rock" by Pitchfork, "a cannily self-made bad boy" by NPR, an "expert provocateur" by Slant Magazine, and "iconoclastic" by NME.

Healy is the recipient of four Brit Awards, and two Ivor Novello Awards including Songwriter of the Year, and has also been nominated twice for the Mercury Prize and Grammy Awards.

== Early life ==
Matthew Timothy Healy was born on 8 April 1989 in Hendon, north London. He is a son of actors Tim Healy and Denise Welch; they divorced in 2012. Both are of Irish descent, and from the North East of England. His maternal grandfather was a drag queen, and younger brother, Louis, is an actor. He lived in Melbourne from the ages of two to four but spent most of his early years living on a cattle farm in Hedley on the Hill, Northumberland. The family moved to Alderley Edge in Cheshire when he was nine.

Healy's parents were working actors of stage and television for much of his childhood, with his mother becoming a celebrity figure in his teens. He himself had no interest in acting but did appear as an extra in his parents' television shows including Coronation Street, Byker Grove and Waterloo Road. His parents were music fans, introducing him to soul and Motown, and his father socialised with many musicians including Brian Johnson of AC/DC (who became Healy's godfather), Rick Wakeman of Yes, Mark Knopfler of Dire Straits, and Jeff Lynne of Electric Light Orchestra. Peter Hook of Joy Division and New Order was a neighbour. His mother's godfather, screenwriter Ian La Frenais, introduced him to Ringo Starr. The first guitar Healy ever played was used by Dire Straits to record "Romeo and Juliet". He has said this early proximity to musicians meant the possibility of "being a rock star was part of my reality."

Healy was a quiet child, with recurring vivid nightmares. He got his first drum kit when he was five, and started doing karate by seven eventually earning a black belt by his teens. For the first twelve years of his life he was an only child "so there were a lot of video games, a lot of Michael Jackson videos, a lot of singing and dancing to myself and self-involvement." Unlike his younger brother, Healy "grew up in a party house" and has recalled sleeping "in the bar" of London's Groucho Club on numerous occasions. He has remembered this aspect of his childhood as "exciting" rather than "distressing". His parents both had issues with alcohol and his mother used cocaine to self-medicate during periods of acute depression, including postpartum.

Privately educated at Lady Barn House School and King's School, Macclesfield, Healy was expelled from the latter for starting a fight club. He won a King's School talent contest at age 12, with renditions of songs by the La's and Oasis, and told a local newspaper he hoped "to be a pop singer" when he grew up. He then transferred to the local comprehensive Wilmslow High School, where he met and befriended his future bandmates. He obtained GCSEs in Music and English, subsequently attending music college for three months before dropping out. The Academy of Contemporary Music website lists Healy as a 2007–2008 alumnus, obtaining a Vocals diploma. Years later, Healy called school "a tedious imposition, getting in the way of me being a pop star".

== Career ==
=== 2002–2011: Beginnings, and early years of the 1975 ===
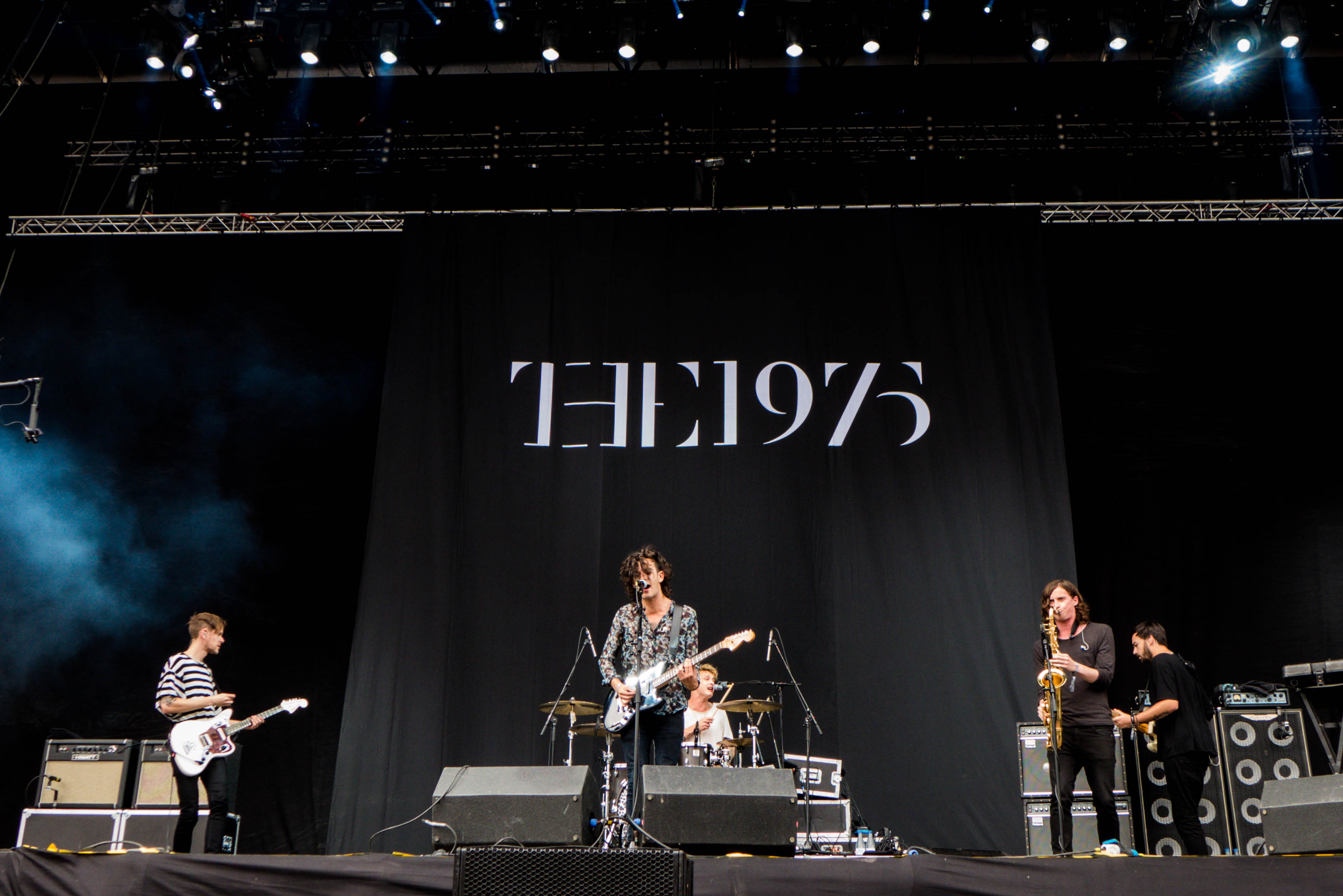
Healy with the 1975 in 2014

In 2002, at the age of 13, Healy was recruited by Adam Hann to be the drummer of a band he was forming with Ross MacDonald at Wilmslow High School. When their potential lead singer dropped out after a rehearsal, Healy also became the lead vocalist. He eventually met George Daniel who took over as the band's drummer. Daniel recalled that Healy was "the most outwardly passionate person in school — endearing, and intimidating". Before making their own music, the band covered punk and emo songs while hanging out at their school's music hall and at Healy's house. Their first performance for 200 people was as part of the council-run Macclesfield Youth Bands.

After leaving school, Healy persuaded his bandmates to attend universities in Manchester to keep the band together. While he briefly attended music school, he had short-lived jobs at FatFace, as a barista at Caffè Nero, and as a delivery boy at a Chinese restaurant. Healy's mother worried about his future but his father "believed in [him] unquestioningly".

=== 2012–2014: Rise to fame ===
Before settling on the band name the 1975 in 2012, they played under various names – Talkhouse, the Slowdown, Bigsleep, Drive Like I Do – around Greater Manchester. Healy recounted that the final name came from the scribblings found on his copy of the novel On the Road by Jack Kerouac that were dated "1 June, The 1975".

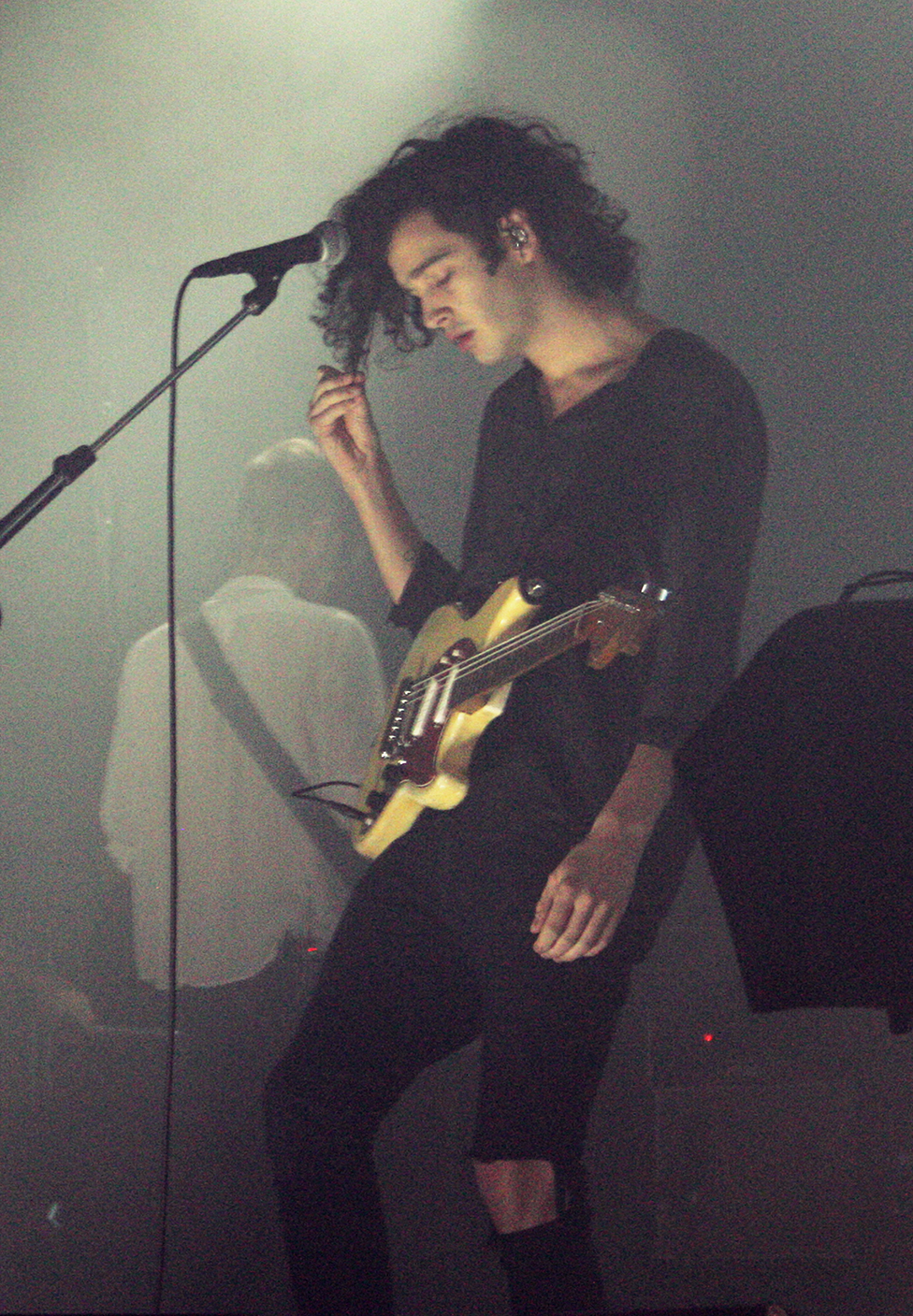
Healy performing in Italy in 2014

The 1975 were rejected by every major record label, with executives confused by the band's genre-hopping approach. Healy later remarked: "We create in the way we consume. We're from this generation, and we don't want to be from another time."

After years as the band's manager, Jamie Oborne set up his own independent label, Dirty Hit, and signed the band for 20 pounds. The band subsequently released four extended plays from 2012 to 2013 – Facedown, Sex, Music for Cars, and IV.

The band began to build momentum in late 2012. Radio DJ Zane Lowe, who was then at the BBC, gave airplay to the EP Facedown, and the band had radio success with "Sex" and "Chocolate", and released their debut album, The 1975, in 2013. Healy said the album was inspired by John Hughes and was intended to be "almost a soundtrack to our teenage years." In reviewing the album, Michael Hann of The Guardian said "the best of the writing here – and it works better at length – is fabulous." The album reached number one on the UK Album Chart. The band sold out three nights at London's Brixton Academy, supported the Rolling Stones at Hyde Park, and played the Pyramid Stage at Glastonbury Festival.

=== 2015–2017: Breakthrough ===
The band released their second album, I Like It When You Sleep, for You Are So Beautiful yet So Unaware of It, in 2016. It landed at No.1 at the UK Albums Chart and also topped the Billboard 200 with 108,000 equivalent units sold, becoming the longest album title at No. 1 in the chart history.

They premiered the lead single, "Love Me", simultaneously scheduling a support tour in Europe, North America, and Asia. They premiered the second single, "UGH!", on 10 December on Beats 1. The album's third single, "The Sound", debuted on BBC Radio 1 on 14 January 2016. The 1975 released the fourth single, "Somebody Else", on 15 February on Beats 1 before the album's release. "A Change of Heart" premiered on Radio 1 on 22 February, four days prior to the album's release. Their performance at Glastonbury Festival in 2016 was highly praised with NME hailing Healy as "Britain's Greatest New Popstar".

Alexis Petridis of The Guardian praised Healy's "witty self-awareness and deprecation" elaborating that he "has an eye for a prosaic detail that undercuts the air of bustling self-importance". The album reached number one in both the UK and US, earned Grammy Award and Brit Award nominations, in addition to being shortlisted for the Mercury Prize.

Healy directed the music video of Pale Waves single "Television Romance", which he also co-produced.

=== 2018–2021: Critical acclaim ===
A Brief Inquiry into Online Relationships, the band's Mercury Prize-nominated third studio album, was followed by Notes on a Conditional Form in 2020; both of which topped the UK Albums Chart.

In 2019, Healy received a Grammy Award nomination for Best Rock Song for "Give Yourself A Try" from their third studio album, A Brief Inquiry into Online Relationships. The album also won a Brit Award for British Album of the Year. In 2020, the band won Band of the Decade, Best British Band, and the Innovator Award at the NME Awards.

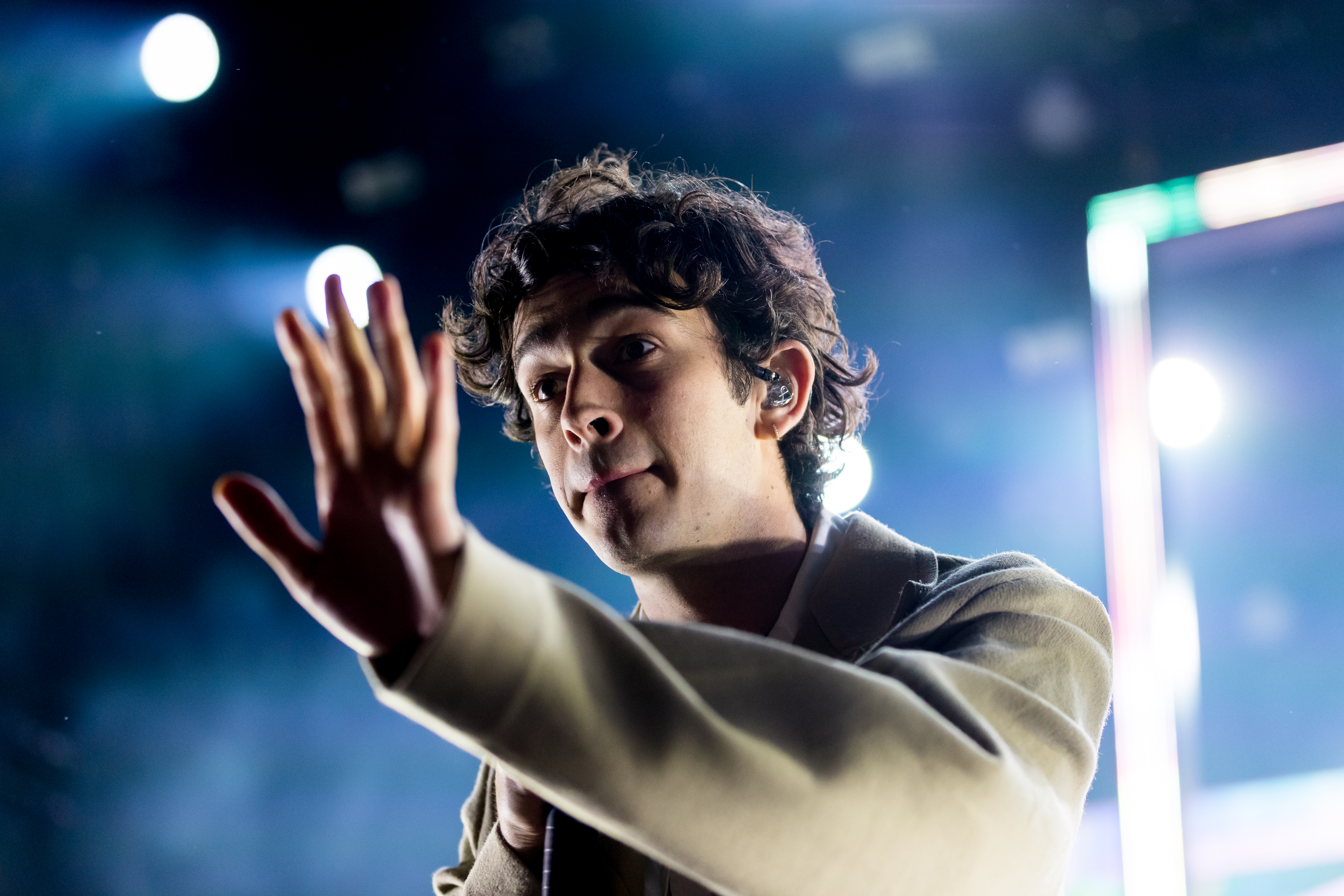
Healy performing in Germany in 2019

Healy's most critically acclaimed songwriting is the song "Love It If We Made It". The song's lyrics are inspired by tabloid headlines of articles covering social and political events of that period, such as police brutality, Black Lives Matter ("selling melanin and then suffocating black men"), the death of Alan Kurdi and the refugee crisis in Europe ("a beach of drowning three-year olds"), Colin Kaepernick's anthem protest against racial injustice in the US ("kneeling on a pitch"), verbatim quotes from Donald Trump ("I moved on her like a bitch"), as well as direct quotes of Trump's tweets ("thank you Kanye, very cool") and a quote from Trump's presidential campaign t-shirt ("fuck your feelings"). The song also refers to post-truth politics, attention economy, prison system in the US, information overload, and the death of rapper Lil Peep. Healy has described it as "a montage for the times, but it's not going to change the times. It doesn't provide a solution." The song's lyrics earned Healy the Best Contemporary Song award at the 2019 Ivor Novello Awards, where he was also awarded Songwriter of the Year.

Healy and George Daniel of the 1975 co-produced No Rome's EP RIP Indo Hisashi, which was released in August 2018. In 2021, he and Daniel produced Beabadoobee's solo EP Our Extended Play, which was released in March 2021. In October 2021, Healy guest-opened for friend Phoebe Bridgers at the Greek Theatre in Los Angeles on her Reunion Tour where they performed the first live duet of the 1975 "Jesus Christ 2005 God Bless America".

=== 2022–2024: Further success ===
In 2022, Healy wrote and produced, with Daniel and Jack Antonoff, the 1975's fifth studio album, Being Funny in a Foreign Language, which gave the band its fifth consecutive number one in the UK. It has also reached number one in Scotland, Ireland and Australia. It debuted at number 7 on the US Billboard 200, as well as top 10 in New Zealand, Japan, Canada and the Netherlands. For his work on the album, he was nominated for Album of the Year at the 2023 Brit Awards, Songwriter of the Year at the Ivor Novello Awards, and won the British Rock/Alternative Act at the 2023 Brit Awards.

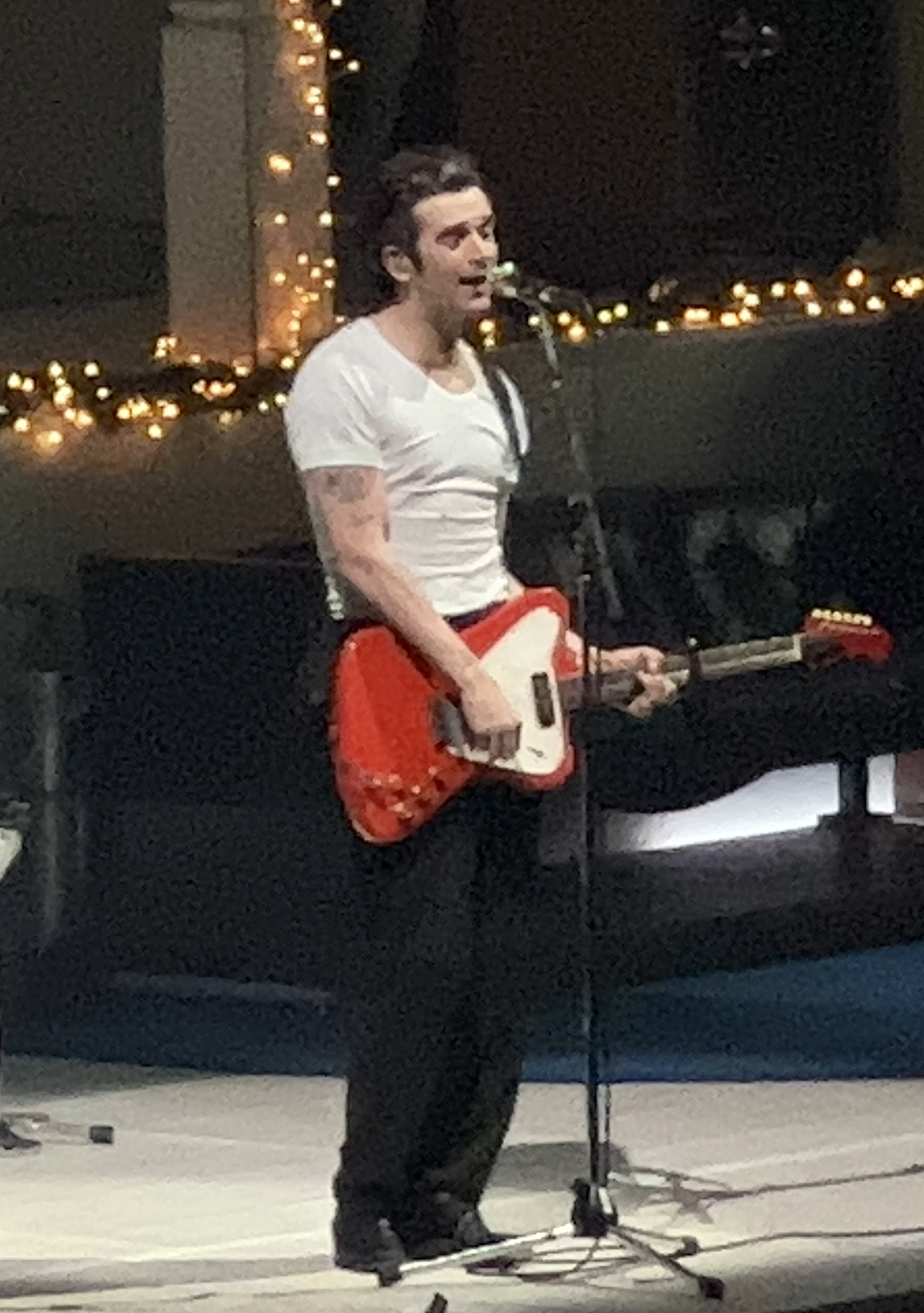
Healy performing in the United States in 2022

In April 2023, the band released Live with the BBC Philharmonic Orchestra, which reached number two in the UK. Healy embarked on a world tour entitled At Their Very Best, to support the band's new album. The set included a life-size house, and two distinct acts and a narrative interlude, the first being the show and then the concert. The show part, which Healy served as writer and director, received unanimous critical acclaim with five star reviews from the Rolling Stone, NME, The Observer, The Telegraph, Evening Standard, and Metro among others. In a review of the tour, Rolling Stone wrote, "Healy and co. have set an extremely high bar for other gigs this year. Part performance art, part rock show, all bolstered by some of the best pop songs to have emerged in the last decade. It should be considered a defining blueprint on how to do arena shows."

In 2022, "Sleep Tight", a Healy and Rob Milton composition, was released by Holly Humberstone in April 2022, and two tracks written by Healy, "Pictures of Us" and "You're Here That's the Thing", are in Beabadoobee's album Beatopia in July 2022. Healy also co-wrote an unreleased song with Lewis Capaldi for his Broken by Desire to Be Heavenly Sent album, and he worked with Taylor Swift on some material for her 2022 album, Midnights. In 2023, Healy provided additional vocals and drums for the Japanese House singles "Sunshine Baby" and "Boyhood" respectively.

In August 2023, Healy and the band headlined Reading and Leeds Festivals for the third time with a "10th Anniversary Performance" of their self-titled debut album released in 2013. This was followed by a concert tour entitled Still... At Their Very Best which commenced across arenas in North America and Europe in September 2023 and ended in March 2024.

=== 2025-Present: DOGS, studio incubation, and hiatus from touring ===
On March 6th, 2025, Healy's band, The 1975, was announced to headline Glastonbury Festival. They were announced along side Neil Young and Oliva Rodrigo as the primary headliners for the festival's Pyramid Stage. This would be the bands only show in 2025 after wrapping up Still... At Their Very best tour in March 2024. Their set was praised and criticize, the viewers enjoyed the polished set. Healy's critics were from him calling himself a 'A generational poet' in a jokingly manner before playing the song Part Of The Band from their 2022 album Being Funny In a Foreign Language. During the Glastonbury set The 1975 would flash the word "DOGS" on the drum kit. It would start speculations for a new album from the band.

Healy in 2023

In December of 2025 Healy appeared at Sunday for Sammy to do a Q&A and give music lessons to students. During the event Healy announced they have two new albums in the works.

Following an intensive tour that wrapped up in March 2024, Healy retreated from the road to spend his time "living in the studio" while not getting much sleep

In 2026 Healy would go on and do background vocals and produce the Folk-Pop band Tiny Habits single "Anything He Was". He'd also help produce and do background vocals for the song "Write Me A Letter" By Indie-Rock artist Beabadoobee.

== Artistry ==
=== Influences ===
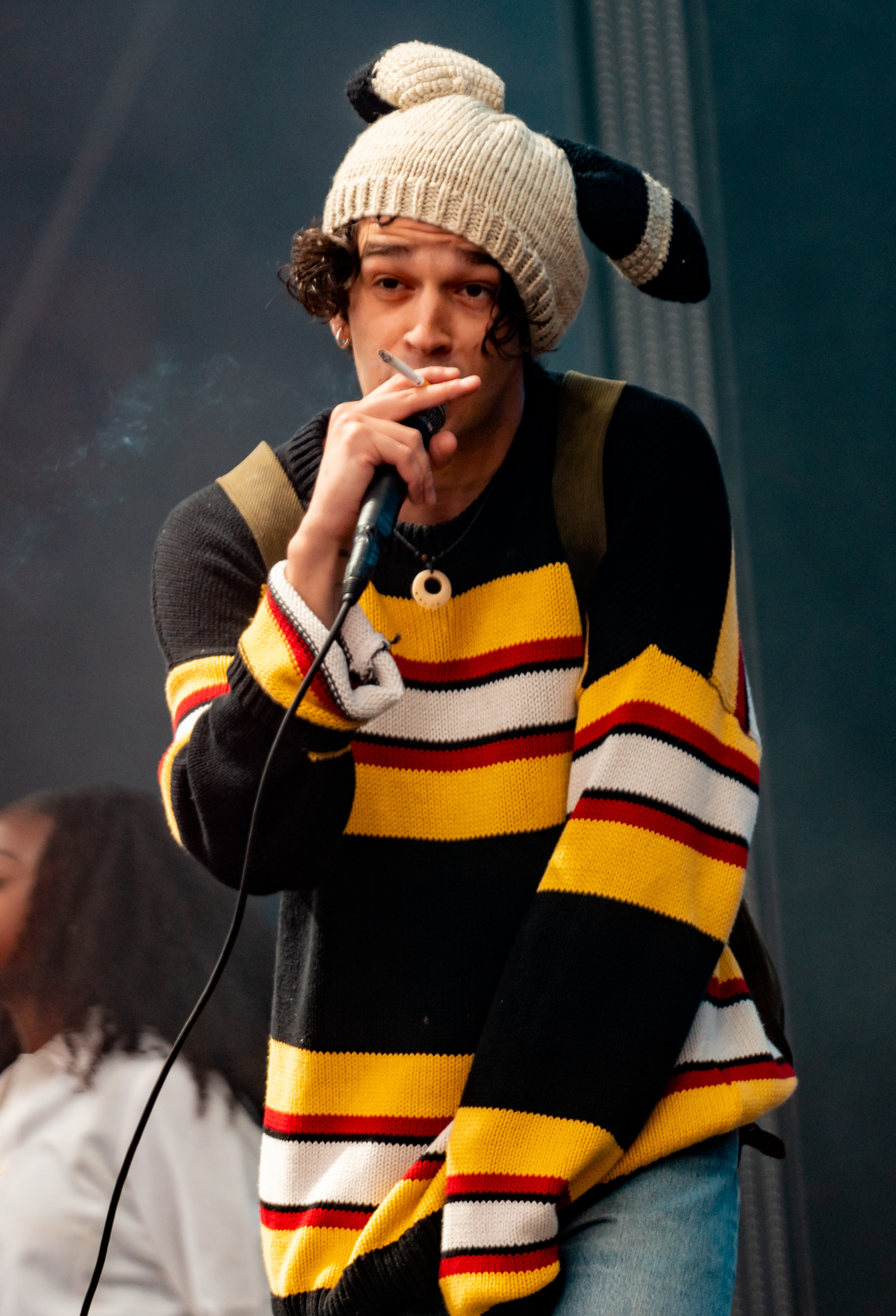
Healy performing in Poland in 2019

Michael Jackson's HIStory show at Wembley Arena in 1996 was Healy's first concert and he has described it as "one of the most memorable and important experiences I think I've ever had." He has named the Streets as the artist that made him know "[he] was going to start a band." "All My Friends" by LCD Soundsystem is his "forever song" and he has tried to replicate it "technically" and "emotionally" throughout his career.

Healy has always been drawn to 1980s music "when pop stars weren't so encumbered with self-awareness. I know that time had its decadence, but there's a real freedom in those records." When the band was recording their debut album, they tried to capture the mood of a John Hughes movie — "the apocalyptic sense of being a teenager".

In 2013, Healy listed his ten all-time favourite albums for Louder Than War. As well as mentions of the Streets and Michael Jackson, Healy listed albums by Glassjaw, My Bloody Valentine, Alexander O'Neal, the Jesus and Mary Chain, Hundred Reasons, Carole King, Peter Gabriel and James Taylor. He has described "darker garage music" like Wookie, Lain, MJ Cole and Four Tet as "so influential to me" and describes "a World Cup, garage or dubstep" as "the only things that make me proud to be English."

In 2020, Healy recorded a podcast series interviewing his musical heroes; he had conversations with Stevie Nicks, Brian Eno, Steve Reich, Kim Gordon, Mike Kinsella, Conor Oberst and Bobby Gillespie. Healy has also cited the Blue Nile as his "favourite band of all time", and Talking Heads and Sigur Rós as influences.

Healy has also been influenced by literary figures including Joan Didion, Jack Keruoac, Seamus Heaney, and Arthur Rimbaud, describing Rimbaud's work as "dense and revolutionary". He has discussed how stand-up comedy is the biggest influence on his songwriting.

=== Voice ===
Healy possesses a tenor vocal range, with a rasp from his cigarette smoking. Pitchfork stated that he is "undeniably one of the best and most elastic vocal performers of his generation". The Recording Academy has described him as having "nimble vocals". The New Yorker stated that Healy has a "shape-shifting voice" where "he croons and wails and screams and murmurs, shading his delivery with a variety of personae". His voice has also been described as "supple", "mellifluously melodic", and "always raw, with emotion".

=== Songwriting ===
The lyricism of Healy is known for its wit, humour, and self-awareness. His musical eclecticism is accompanied by lyrics that are "complex, clever, catchy" streams of consciousness and tongue-twisters, in addition to being "topical, explicit, and relentlessly self-referential." Clash noted that Healy's "lyricism alone finds him a cut above almost all of his peers", and NME stated that he is "undoubtedly, one of this generation's finest wordsmiths." The Guardian has characterised him as a prose poet, with Consequence declaring him "rock's poet laureate of heartbreak, growing up, and fucking up."

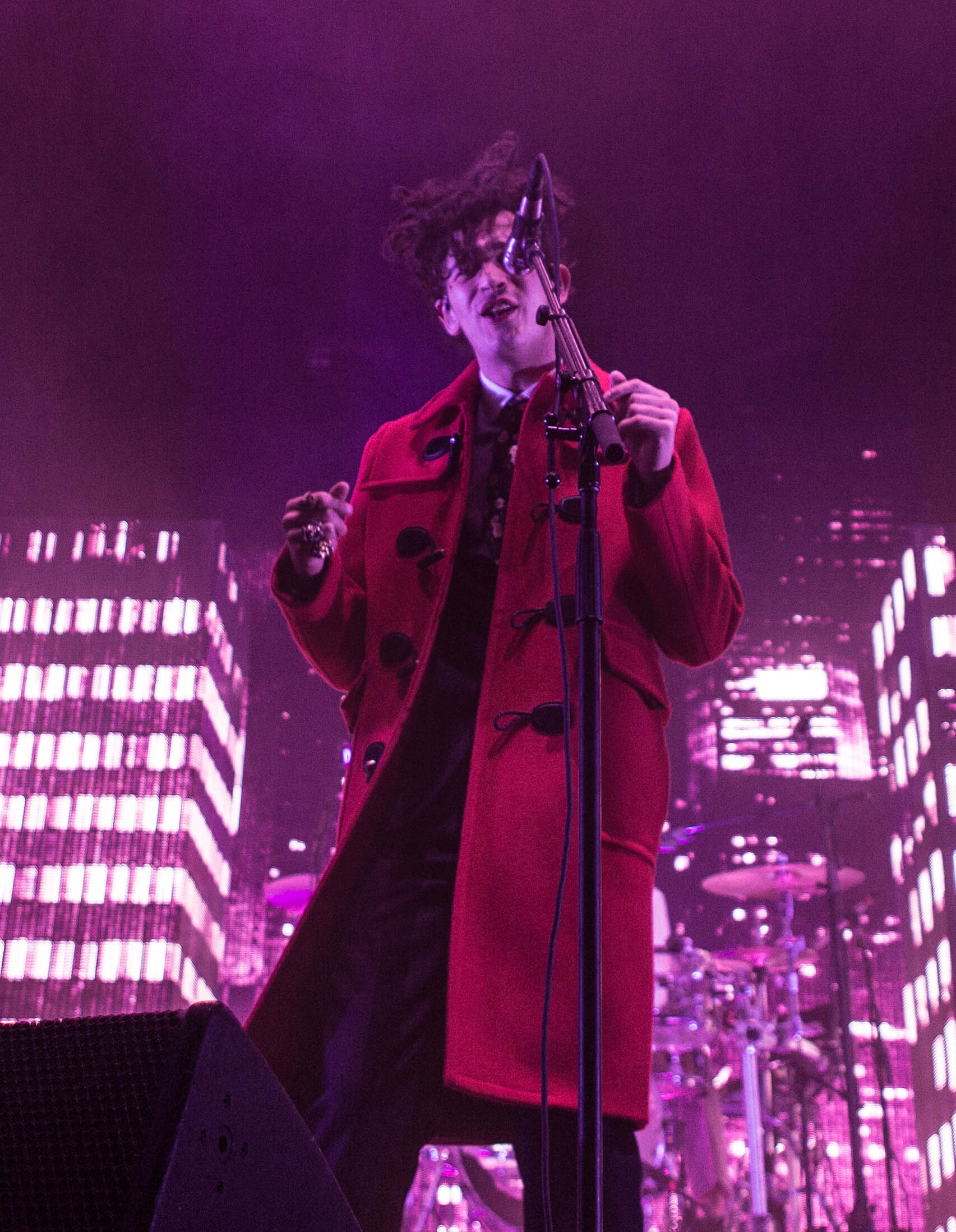
Healy performing in the United States in 2016

The New York Times has described Healy as "one of the best contemporary writers — especially outside of rap — on the process of consumption, whether it's drugs or culture or goods". Pitchwork stated that Healy "is cursed with a self-awareness that can turn a simple idea into a galaxy-brain diatribe". The Fader described his songwriting as having "layered, claustrophobic lyrics [which] reveal[s] a man obsessed with fear and fragility, success and failure, endlessly looking for answers about himself and the pop-culture world he uncomfortably inhabits". GQ has dubbed Healy "the poster boy for overthinkers", with Ann Powers of NPR describing him as "an astute social observer who doubles as a confessionalist, offering disclosures that are always suspect: He might be lying every time he opens his mouth." The Guardian has remarked upon his "lyrical frankness: he wrote not about the party life of the 20-something, but about the fallout from the party," adding that "Healy is often his own sharpest critic. He uses dialogue in his songs – half-real, half-invented – to interrogate himself. Integral to his commitment to honesty and self-awareness is the knowledge that honesty and self-awareness can turn into just another shtick if you are not careful ... [He] is one of few songwriters who can examine internet culture without rendering you paralysed by embarrassment, because his music sounds the way the modern world feels: overstimulated, lurching between excitement and anxiety."

Healy has stated that he used to consider himself a beat poet, before describing his job as "curating my life through music". NPR has noted that he "has long treated writing songs for the 1975 as his diary". Healy often writes about the millennial generation, masculinity, current affairs, as well as his own life and relationships. He has also written songs about his drug abuse, most notably "Chocolate" (marijuana), "UGH!" (cocaine) and "It's Not Living (If It's Not with You)", a song about his heroin addiction and recovery. "Lostmyhead" and the "Ballad of Me and My Brain" were written about his mental state. He has described his songwriting partnership with bandmate Daniel as "symbiotic": "We've got a shared musical vocabulary. Even if we're both working remotely, we're both working together." Daniel has described himself as the "primary producer" and Healy as the "primary songwriter" of the band.

He is known to write songs using typewriters as well as pen and paper for the "commitment that goes with the ceremony" of writing.

=== Performance style ===
Widely known for his charisma, stage presence, and showmanship, the BBC has characterised Healy as "one of the most iconic frontmen of his generation". The Telegraph has described him as "a compelling rock star, a gifted multi-instrumentalist ... whose self-questioning lyrics and uninhibited stagecraft ensured that it was hard to take your eyes off him". The Guardian declared him as "one of music's most compulsively watchable provocateurs thanks to his inescapable charisma, open-mouthed honesty and his band's self-aware and sparkling 80s pop-rock."

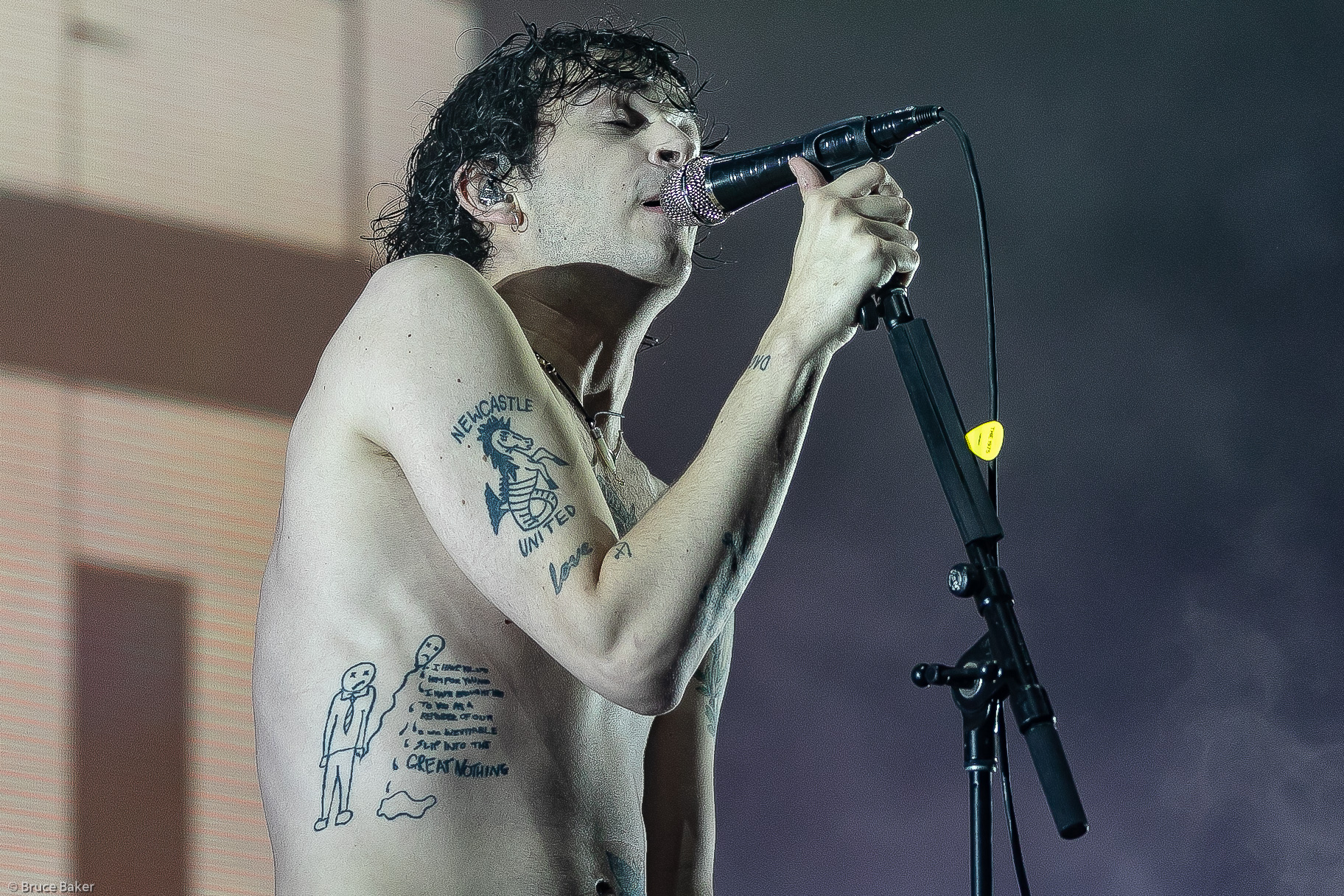
Healy performing in Australia in 2020

Billboard has characterised Healy as "a rock star for a generation that's too clued-in to believe in rock stars," noting that "onstage, he deconstructs his own performance as he goes along". Rolling Stone has described him as "a performer who is just as likely to show up onstage in an oversize parka and tulle skirt as he is shirtless with skinny jeans." Healy has stated that when he is "on stage, the showman in [him] takes over," and is known to smoke and drink from a bottle of red wine, and flask in concerts. He plays a character while performing saying: "I do the Jim Morrison thing a bit, but I know that you know that I know that this isn't real." He is interested in playing with contemporary audiences' awareness of rock star cliches: "That ridiculousness, and the elephants in the room are always the things that I find the most interesting. Everything apart from the music is ridiculous, because we all know too much." Vox describes Healy's stage persona as "a self-aware, ironic performance of fame and authenticity in the social media age". Healy, who describes his private self as "soft and quiet", has acknowledged that his "meta-layered" approach to performance means there are public "misconceptions" about him.

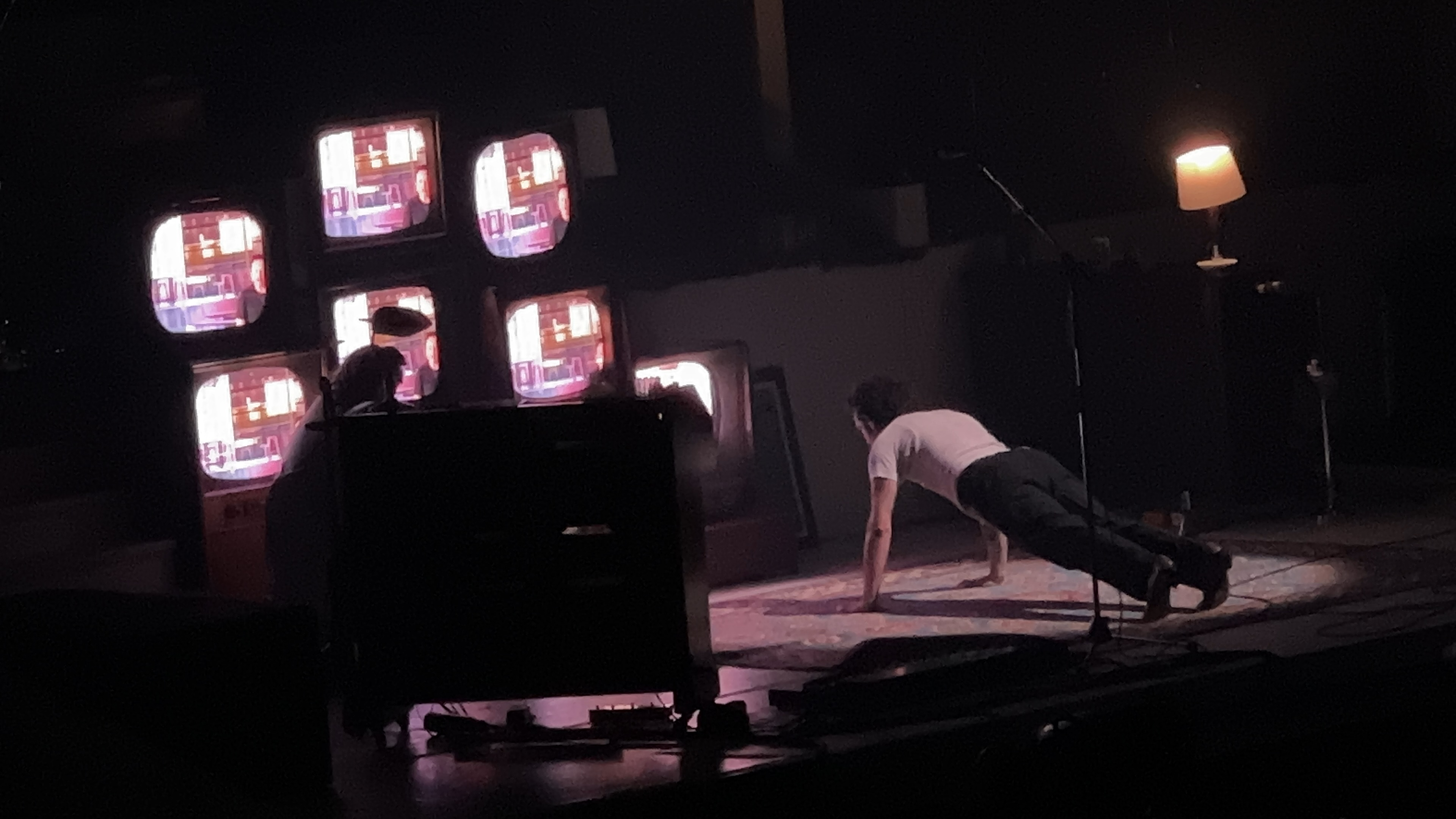
Healy doing press-ups as part of his performance for the 1975's At Their Very Best concert tour

The 1975's At Their Very Best world tour in 2022 and 2023, which Healy wrote and directed, included a commentary on contemporary masculinity: "It's about how if you're a single guy and you've spent a year or so alone on the internet, you go mental. The show is about looking at masculinity, looking at being famous. It's about being what's real and what's sincere and not sincere." The Observer has described it as "part performance art, part stage play, part Charlie Kaufman movie about a rock star in crisis." Clips from the show went viral on TikTok and other social media platforms, prompting wide media coverage of his onstage actions, dubbing him "a sleazeball" or a "sensitive dirtbag". In Rolling Stone's review of the performance, the magazine stated that Healy delivered "a subversive and surreal take on modern masculinity [that] when viewed in isolation on social media, that all-importance nuance is entirely absent." The performance included him eating a raw steak, depicting masturbation and delivering 20 press-ups in immediate succession. In the US leg of the tour, Healy got a tattoo on stage that read "iM a MaN". Healy has also invited both male and female members of his audience to kiss him during his performance of the song "Robbers" and, on one occasion, sucked a fan's thumb. The Guardian said it sparked conversations regarding consent, fantasy and art in 2022, and noted that Healy asked for fans' permission first.

== Legacy ==
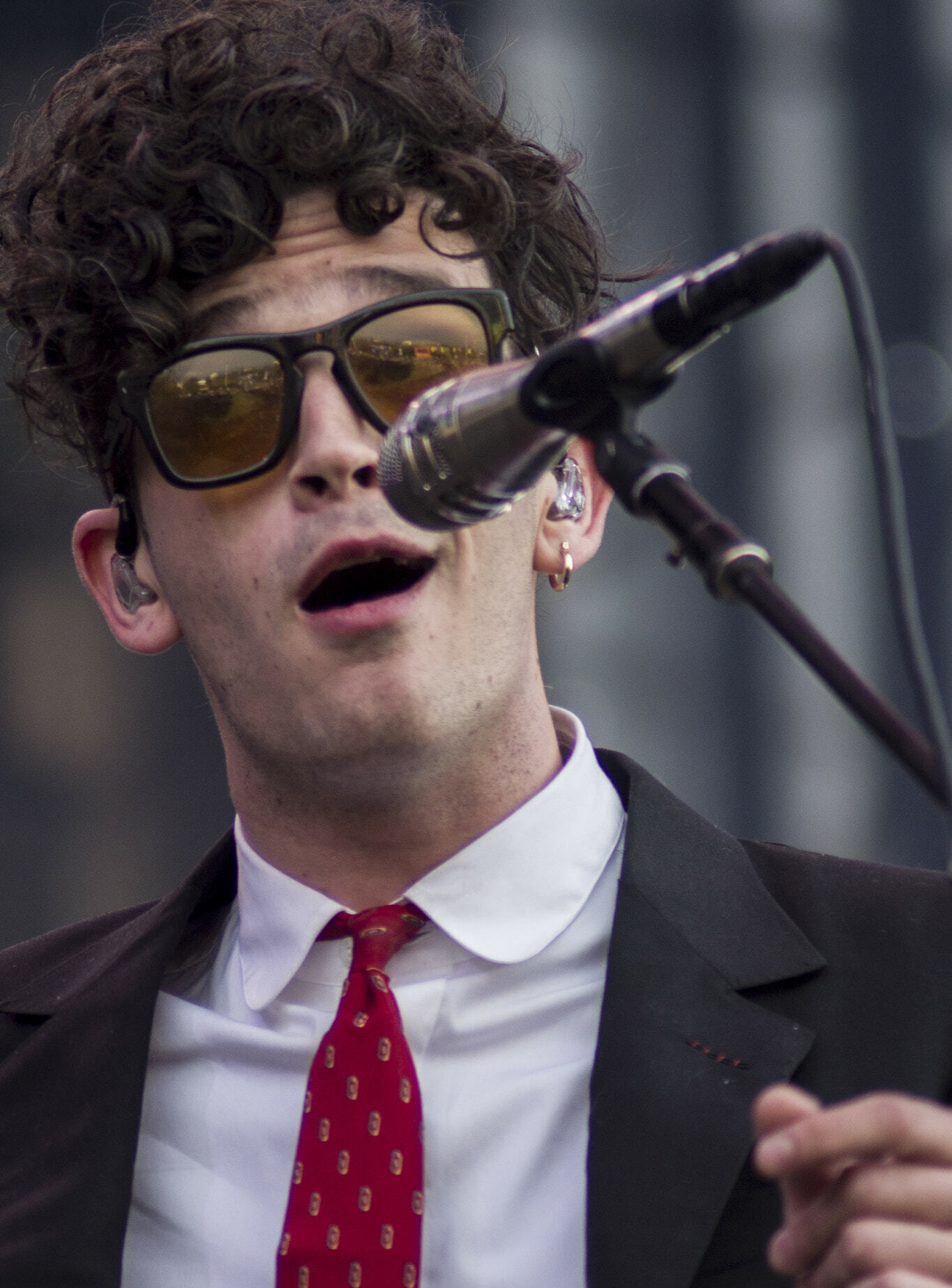
Healy performing in Chile in 2017

Healy has influenced numerous music artists and has inspired several singer-songwriters with the Chicago Tribune describing him as "one of the younger generation's most influential artistic leaders". Billie Eilish has said Healy was an early inspiration for her: "His show is the second show I ever went to in my life. He changed so much about who I am, how I write music." Halsey was "really influenced" by Healy's lyrical approach stating: "His lyrical content is a lot of dialogue, a lot of places. It's very descriptive and it creates this honest, authentic image." Lewis Capaldi is particularly drawn to Healy's "self-awareness" and is "envious" of his ability to write humorous lyrics: "He's incredible, I absolutely love him." Sam Fender won a singing competition at 16 where Healy was a judge, and years later was quoted saying: "Every time I see Matty I can't help but fanboy him really hard". Holly Humberstone has described him as a “musical genius”, while Robbie Williams, who labeled the current music scene as "boring," singled out Healy as "the only commercially viable pop/rock star who is willing to be something other than beige," describing Healy as "unhinged, super smart, super talented".

Stevie Nicks has described Healy's lyrics to "She's American" as poetry, while Brian Eno told Healy that "Love It If We Made It" was the kind of political song he wished he could write. Lorde has described "Somebody Else" as a song that "really influenced Melodrama. It influenced the tones and the colors and the emotions." Shawn Mendes has called Healy "the best frontman" he has ever seen, and stated that the band's third album was the inspiration for his single "If I Can't Have You". Michelle Zauner who is a "longtime 1975 fan" described him as "the perfect frontman" and admires his lyrical ability "to make something compelling and profound and smart that's also so on the verge of making people hate him."

Mick Jagger, Taylor Swift, Ed Sheeran, Harry Styles, Phoebe Bridgers, and Baby Queen are known admirers of his work.

=== Healywave ===
Healy and the 1975's influence on the indie pop scene has been termed "Healywave" by NME. Described as "deftly plucked, palm-muted guitar line, hop, skip and jumping its way across shimmering pop synth work and third-wave emo lyricism," The Big Issue added that it's a "dreamified take on Eighties pop-rock". "Healywave" acts named by the NME include Pale Waves, Fickle Friends, and the Aces among others. Healy has also mentored artists such as No Rome, Beabadoobee, the Japanese House, and Heather Baron-Gracie, and co-produced their early works. Beabadoobee has stated that Healy has given her “really good advice" about songwriting, adding: "I think he has a way of finding a sentence that really fucking hits you.”

In 2021, Essex singer Georgia Twinn released the single "Matty Healy", which has been described by Clash as "a potent alt-pop banger" that leans on "glossy Healywave" vibes. In 2023, Nashville-based singer Knox released the pop rock track "Not The ,1975" inspired by a woman commenting "That's cool but you're not Matty Healy," after telling her he's a musician. The following year, Los Angeles-based indie pop singer Lina Cooper released the single "Matty Healy".

== Political views and activism ==
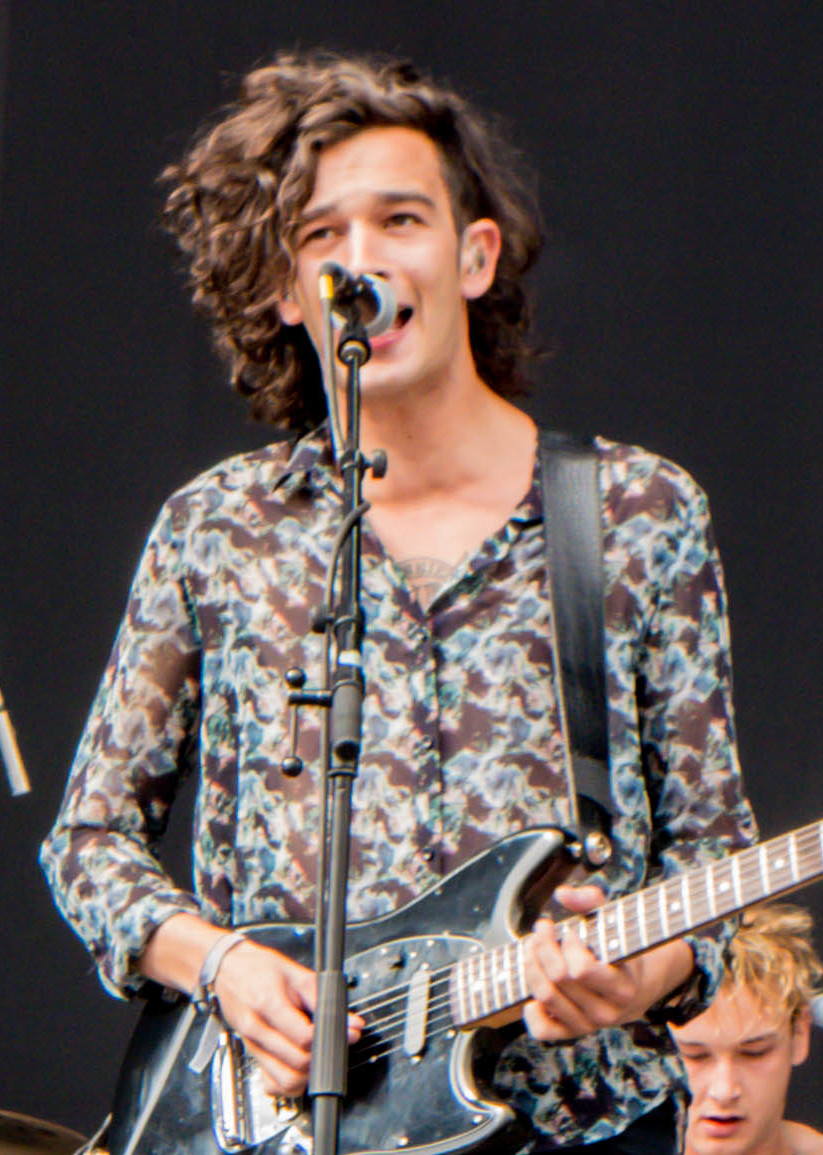
Healy performing in Spain in 2014

Healy identifies as a liberal and a traditional progressive, and has been outspoken in his support of progressive issues since the start of his career. By 2022, Healy, who reaffirmed that he is "definitely on the left," had become "suspicious of woke-ism as a viable worldview or device to make things better" and wanted to communicate to younger fans the perils of overly rigid moral standards: "You will make mistakes, you will hurt people, you will do things that some people will perceive as rotten. It's this standard that I'm trying to break down. I'm just a bloke, so are you." "I'm not afraid to apologise or change my mind in public [...] I can only know a certain amount of things, and if one of them's wrong, what can I do? I've got to grow and say ‘That was stupid’, and that I'm sorry."

While onstage in Denmark in 2023, Healy referred to comedians and social critics George Carlin, Bill Hicks and Lenny Bruce as "staples of the left" and his "heroes" who exposed social hypocrisy with vulgarity, adding: "I do feel that if the left loses its ability to fuck shit up then we leave too much space for the right."

In 2017, Healy publicly encouraged voting Labour despite saying he does not know "how to use [his] ‘platform’ in order to incentivise democracy". He did not publicly support Labour ahead of the 2019 United Kingdom general election and later said he was "disillusioned. I don't like Jeremy Corbyn, I don't like Boris Johnson, I didn't trust either of them." In 2023, Healy criticised "the apathy of the left" in contemporary British politics: "The Labour Party here can't even get behind the rail workers and dockers' strikes." On stage in the same year, Healy urged the audience to resist the demonisation of strikers. While performing in Scotland in January and May, Healy spoke in support of Scottish independence.

When performing the 1975's 2017 song "Loving Someone" on stage, Healy regularly prefaces the song with comments on social issues; the song has variously been dedicated to victims of the 2016 Orlando nightclub shooting, used to express solidarity with Black, Muslim and gay Americans following the 2016 US election results, used to decry the "regressive ideals" of Brexit, and dedicated to the people of Manchester and London following the 2017 Manchester Arena attack.

=== LGBTQ rights ===
Healy has been a vocal advocate for LGBTQ rights. In 2018, Healy and his bandmates made what The Guardian described as a "significant" donation to an LGBTQ community centre for London. In June 2019, Healy won Ally of the Year at the Diva Awards for using his platform to promote LGBTQ rights. In 2020, he appeared on the cover of Attitude’s Activists & Allies Issue. In December 2022, he performed at the 8th annual Ally Coalition benefit show in support of LGBTQ youth.

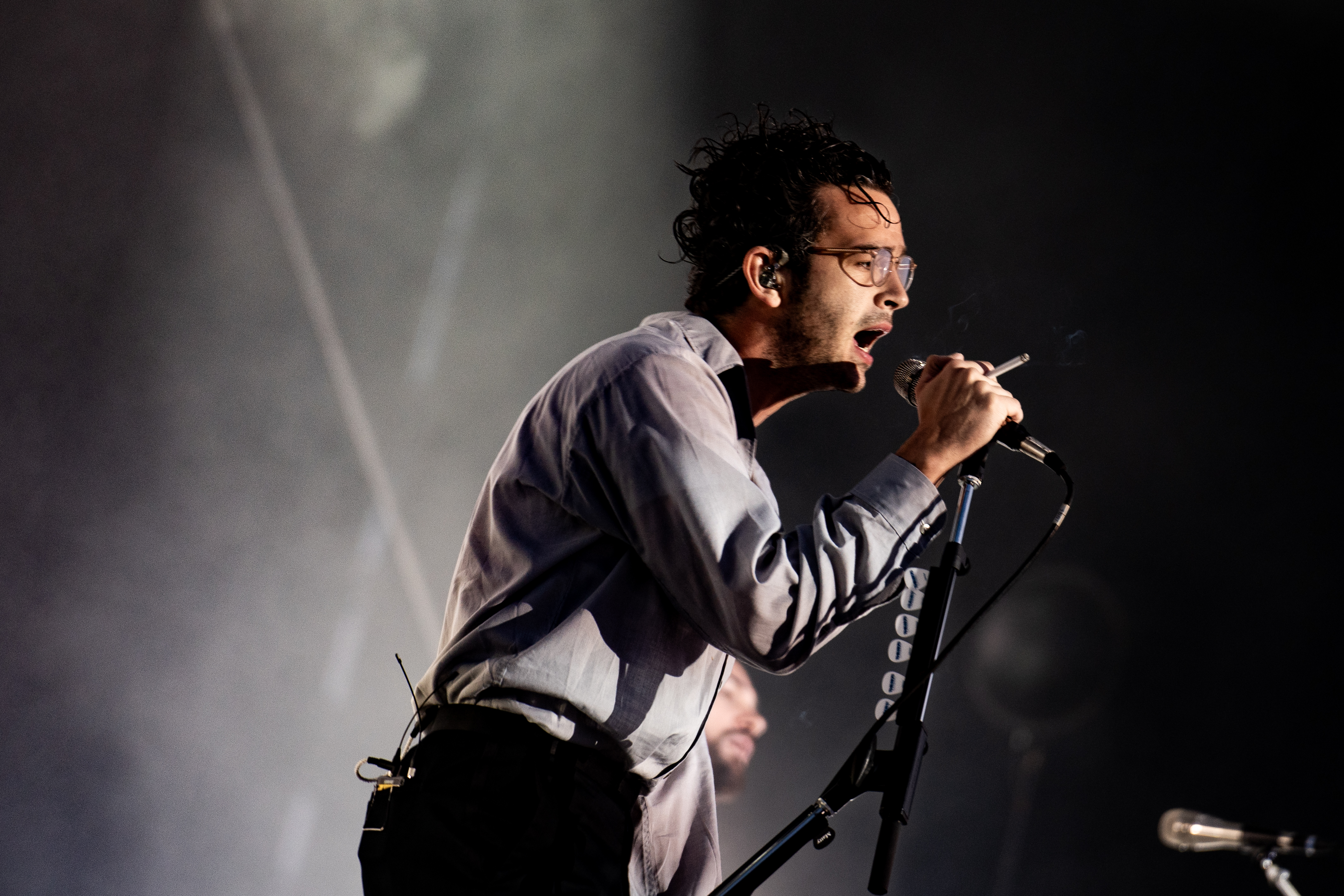
Healy performing in Germany in 2023

In August 2019, Healy was banned from Dubai after displaying a pride flag and kissing a male fan onstage to protest Dubai's anti-LGBT laws, an act that was punishable by ten years in prison. In a subsequent interview, he reflected that he "felt pretty irresponsible" but ultimately dismissed it.

In 2023, Healy as well as the rest of the 1975 were briefly imprisoned and banned from Malaysia and forced by the authorities to prematurely end their performance at the Good Vibes Festival after he criticised the country's widespread anti-LGBT laws and kissed fellow band mate Ross MacDonald on stage. The organisers subsequently cancelled the rest of the three-day festival, on government orders, citing that Healy's "controversial conduct and remarks" are "against the traditions and values of the local culture". The protest was met with both criticism and praise. Healy addressed the incident during the band's concert in Dallas stating: "If you truly believe that artists have a responsibility to uphold their liberal virtues by using their massive platforms, then those artists should be judged by the danger and inconvenience that they face for doing so, not by the rewards they receive for parroting consensus. There's nothing particularly stunning or brave about changing your fucking profile picture whilst you're sat in your house in LA." Human rights and LGBT activist Peter Tatchell, writing for The Guardian, wrote that criticism of Healy and the band "deflect attention from where the criticisms should be most urgently directed: against the homophobia of the Kuala Lumpur regime." He also expressed that Healy is no white saviour for showing solidarity to the community as "queer rights are a universal human right, not a western one". The organisers of the festival sued the band in the High Court for breach of contract and sought £1.9 million in damages.

Healy has criticised the anti-transgender laws of Mississippi calling it "bullshit" in an onstage speech during their Still... At Their Very Best tour in 2023.

=== Climate change mitigation ===
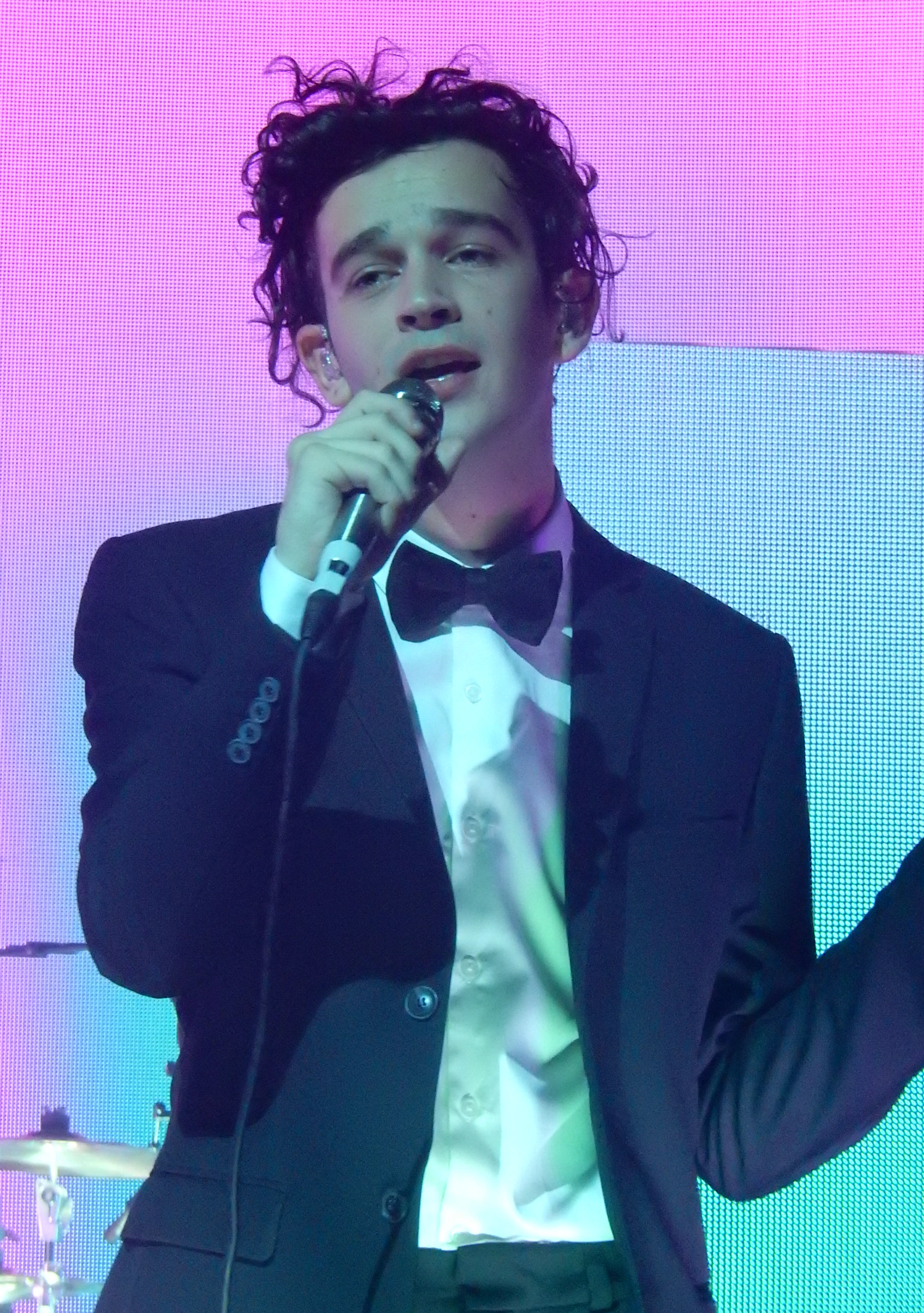
Healy performing in the United Kingdom in 2016

Healy is outspoken on climate change issues. In 2020, he invited Greta Thunberg to record a speech about climate change for a 1975 track. Conservative MP David Davies accused Healy of "hypocrisy" given his touring schedule but Healy responded: "The idea that no one should say anything or try to help if they haven't 100% figured out how to be carbon neutral, along with the rest of the world, is a really illogical way of thinking about the problem."

Healy and the 1975 use an "eco-management" company when touring; a tree is planted for every ticket sold in their Music for Cars tour, the crew catering is sustainable, there is no plastic, and an area is set up in each venue where people can learn about "proper recycling". The band's four shows at the O2 Arena in London in 2024 will mark the world's first-ever carbon-removed events. This involves carbon dioxide generated by the events being sucked out of the air, as well as planting trees and spreading carbon dioxide-absorbing volcanic rock on farmland.

=== Gender issues ===
Healy has been outspoken about women's rights, particularly as it relates to the music industry. In 2018, Healy apologized after stating that "the reason misogyny doesn't happen in rock and roll anymore is because it's a vocabulary that existed for so long that it got weeded out". He later described his comments as "ignorant" and "wrong, just outright misinformed." When the 1975 won Best British Group at the 2019 Brit Awards, Healy used his acceptance speech to criticise misogyny in the music industry, quoting a piece by The Guardian's journalist Laura Snapes. Also that year, Healy denounced Alabama's anti-abortion laws during a concert in the state. In 2020, he pledged to only play at music festivals with a gender-balanced lineup.

Healy has spoken about young men being radicalised into anti-feminist communities: "I do know that the right wing is more successful with the acquiring of young men than the left is, and as somebody who's definitely on the left, it's interesting to watch, because the left don't seem to have [an] ideal masculinity, whereas the right have a very, very easy one." He has remarked that in contemporary pop culture, the celebrated man is "some meta-performance piece about deconstruction": "The only form of masculinity that is celebrated is one that deconstructs it. So: in a dress. I don't know what it is to be a man if you're not just deconstructing being a man and having that [be] celebrated."

=== Religion ===
Healy was not raised in a religious household and identifies as an atheist. He is a patron of Humanists UK, a charitable organisation that promotes secular humanism, human rights and represents non-religious people. In 2014, Healy, who described himself as "profoundly anti-religion", tweeted: "ISIS are cutting little girls heads off and you want to challenge a non-religious, humanist perspective? I don't understand the world at all". When challenged by a nineteen-year-old Muslim woman operating a Harry Styles–themed Twitter account, he said he "resent[ed] being 'educated' on religion by a Harry Styles fan account." When asked about the resulting controversy in 2015, Healy said: "I may not be as progressive as I'd like to be. There are some innate structures of thought within me that I'm really embarrassed about. I'm not as bright as I'd like to be."

By 2018, Healy's position on faith had evolved: "I used to be an ATHEIST, now I'm like an atheist. It's not that I have softened on the logic or anything, but I'm really understanding and quite sensitive of the culture of religion. Because culture is a very different thing to scripture and dogma."

== Public image ==
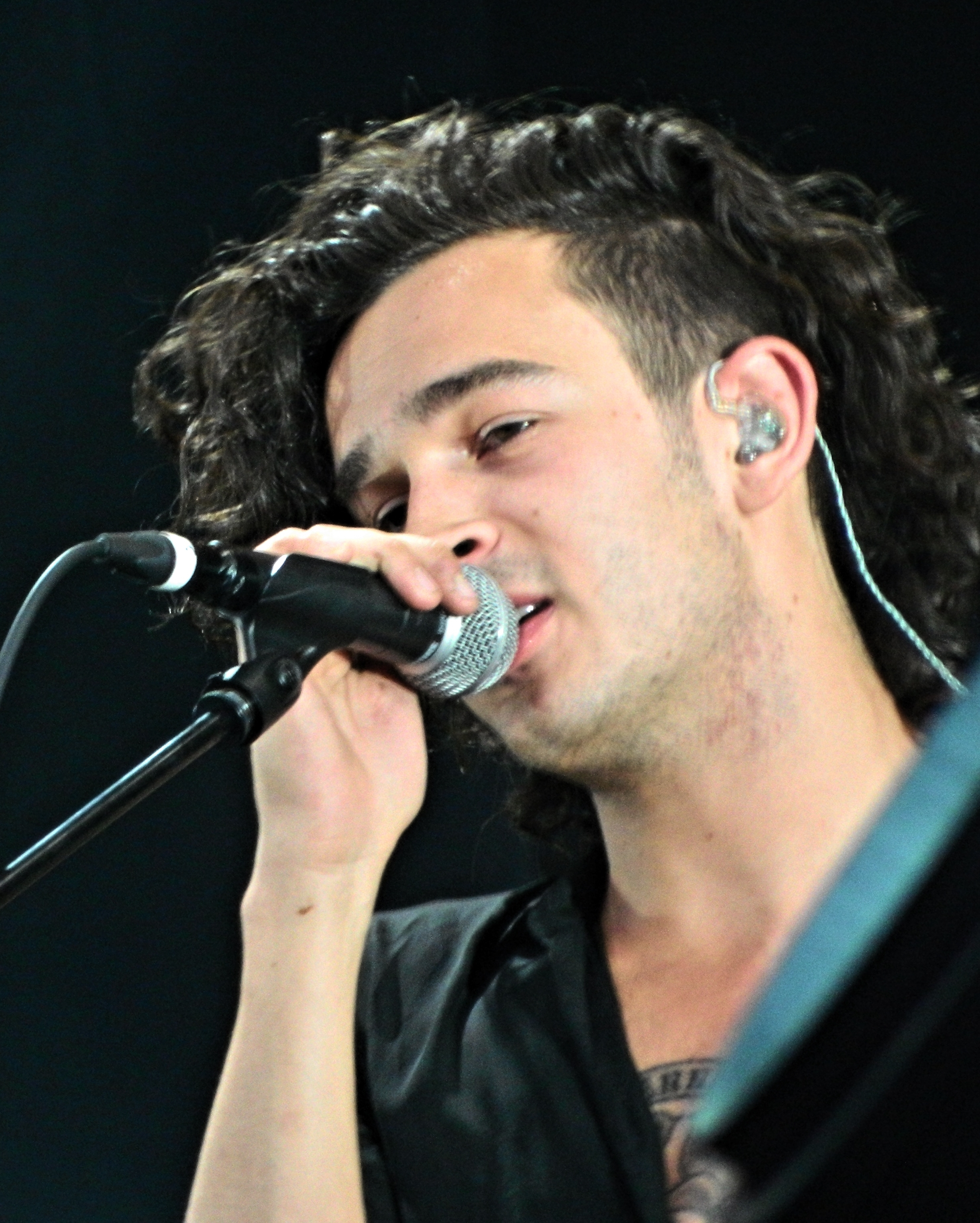
Healy performing in France in 2014

Healy has been described as a "spokesperson for the millennial generation" by Rolling Stone, "the enfant terrible of pop-rock" by Pitchfork, "a cannily self-made bad boy" by NPR, an "expert provocateur" by Slant Magazine, and "iconoclastic" by NME. The Telegraph has called him "the millennial Jim Morrison" and "the Bob Dylan of raising your blood pressure", with The Times observing that Healy's ability to provoke his audience is reminiscent of Morrissey, despite not sharing his politics.

Since rising to fame in the early 2010s Healy has been dubbed a heartthrob and sex symbol by several media outlets. Stereogum has observed that "he actively subverts the role" with his eccentricities and onstage antics. Early in his career, Healy had been known for his ever-changing hairstyles and fashion which included wearing his collection of vintage shirts, and skirts on tour. He has described this period as him having an identity crisis, and his style as "sexually confused Edward Scissorhands".

He has built a reputation as an unusually candid interviewee. Billboard described the experience of interviewing him as "a wild ride ... [His] earnest craving to be understood creates a sense of intimacy disproportionate to the fact that we've only just met." The Guardian said Healy's "compulsion to say whatever is on his mind makes him a divisive figure – to some the mood board for a generation, to others a pretentious motormouth." Michael Hann of The Guardian has observed that Healy "must be a horror to handle" for his manager and publicist, commenting: "He says absolutely anything, sometimes contradicting himself from sentence to sentence. He makes up words [...] and he's grandly, fabulously pretentious ... It was one of the rare interviews that you find yourself fascinated to transcribe." In 2020, Healy said he did not intend to give any more interviews and reflected in 2023: "I think I'd gotten to a point where I didn't know how much I wanted to qualify my statements."

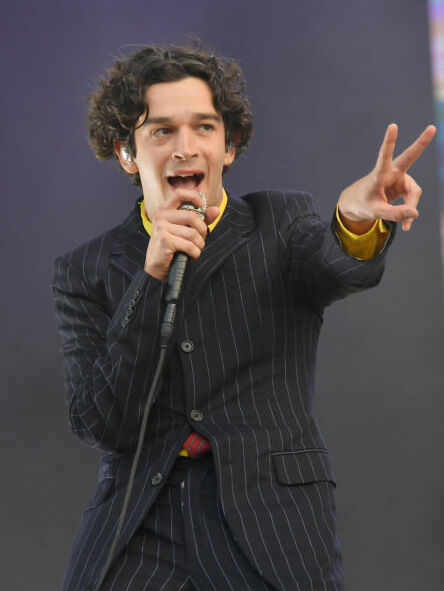
Healy performing in the United States in 2019

Healy has been described by The Times as "the first, and last, great frontman of the social media era". He first used the online pseudonym Truman Black as a teenager to prevent fans of his parents messaging him on Facebook, and later used it as his handle across his public social media accounts on Twitter, Instagram and Tumblr.

Healy deactivated his Twitter account in 2020 because he no longer wanted to participate in the "culture war" and wanted to take a more considered approach to his public statements. Following the murder of George Floyd in 2020, Healy had tweeted: "[I]f you truly believe that 'ALL LIVES MATTER' you need to stop facilitating the end of black ones", and posted a YouTube link to the 1975's protest song "Love It If We Made It". Amid online criticism that his tweet was self-promotional, Healy apologised and deactivated his account. He later reflected: "My reaction in the room to all that Twitter shit was like, 'Oh fuck off! You know that I'm not using this as an opportunity to monetise the half-a-pence I get paid for a fucking YouTube play'. What I'm saying is, 'Here's something I've really thought about', and all you've been asking for four days is 'Say something about it!' So I said, 'Here's what I think'."

Healy remained active on Instagram. He partnered with Amnesty International to raise awareness of various online petitions. According to NME, Healy also showed a "sensei-like mastery of [...] shitposting": "His Instagram stories have been awash with eyebrow-raising jokes, artful trolling of hardcore fans, and explicit attempts to get cancelled". Tolentino of The New Yorker noted that, on Instagram, Healy "constantly made fun of both himself and the fans who seemed obsessed with his morality." She described his resulting public persona as that of "a post-woke rock star, switching unpredictably between tenderness and trollishness".

In January 2023, a video of Healy performing the band's song "Love It If We Made It" went viral. While singing the lyric "Thank you, Kanye, very cool", which is a direct quote of a tweet from Donald Trump, Healy marched on the spot and raised his left hand, leading to online debate about whether the gesture was intended as a Nazi salute. In November 2022, Healy had denounced West's recent antisemitic remarks, saying that "grief" and "mental health issues" did not excuse them.

Healy appeared on the leftist irony podcast The Adam Friedland Show in February 2023. He agreed to be a guest partly to provoke a reaction from his fanbase. During the episode, he laughed as co-hosts Friedland and Nick Mullen joked about the possible origin of Ice Spice's stage name and ancestry using various accents. These comments were later widely and incorrectly attributed to Healy. Ice Spice would later recall that Healy has personally apologised to her multiple times for his appearance and they remain on good terms. Healy also joked about watching internet pornography in which black women are "brutalised", supposedly from the controversial website Ghetto Gaggers. In a subsequent podcast episode, Friedland clarified that he himself mentioned the site simply due to finding its name humorous, and "did not even know" if Healy had ever visited it. In March 2023, Healy told Jia Tolentino in a profile for The New Yorker that the controversy was "people going, 'Oh, there's a bad thing over there, let me get as close to it as possible so you can see how good I am.'" He admitted to "oppositional" behaviour and "exaggeration of my shit" over the previous 18 months. The New York Times music critic Jon Caramanica described the public response as an example of context collapse.

By early April 2023, Healy stated during an Adelaide concert as part of the 1975's At Their Very Best tour: "The era of me being a fucking arsehole is coming to an end ... I can't perform off the stage anymore." In October 2023, in an onstage speech at the band's concert in Hollywood Bowl as part of their Still... At Their Very Best tour, Healy has clarified that he had "performed exaggerated versions" of himself "in an often misguided attempt to fulfill the kind of character role of the 21st-century rock star. Because some of my actions have hurt some people, I apologise to those people, and I pledge to do better moving forward," he told the audience, adding, "You see, as an artist, I want to create an environment for myself to perform where not everything that I do is taken literally."

== Personal life ==
Healy resides in northwest London. He was in a relationship with Australian model Gabriella Brooks (2015–2019) and English singer FKA Twigs (2020–2022). He has been romantically connected to American singer-songwriters Halsey and Taylor Swift. Healy entered a relationship with American model and musician Gabbriette in September 2023. They got engaged in May 2024, and were married on 18 July 2026 at Castillo del Lago in Los Angeles.

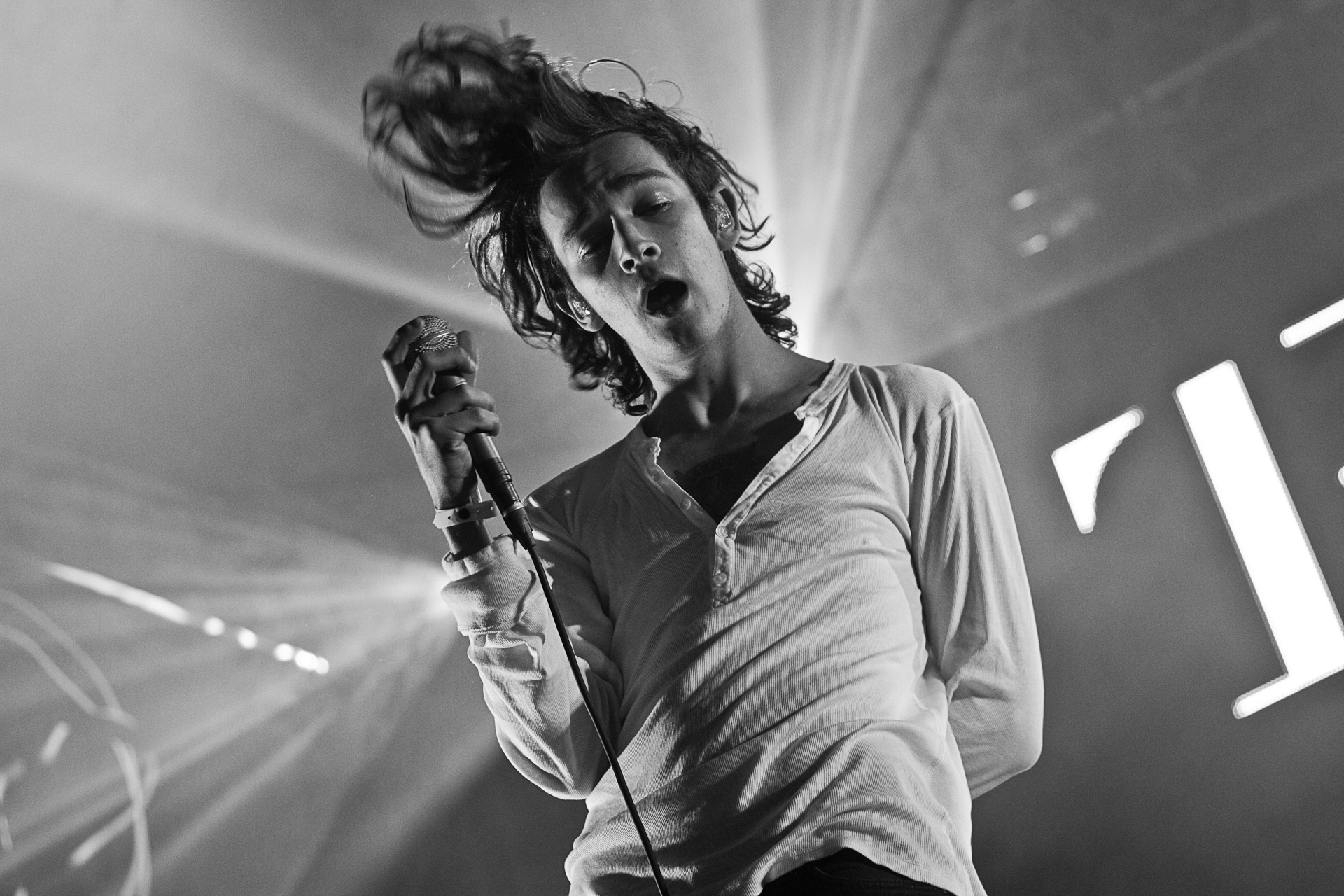
Healy performing in Germany in 2014

Healy identifies as straight and has said he is not attracted to men in a "carnal, sexual way". In 2019, Queerty reported that Healy had come out as an "aesthete". Healy issued a statement on Twitter, criticising the publication for misinterpreting his words: "I didn't come out as anything. [...] I'm not playing a game and trying to take up queer spaces, I'm simply trying to be an ally and this headline makes me uncomfortable." Healy was a "gangly and effeminate" teenager and was drawn to George Michael, Prince and Michael Jackson rather than traditional figures of masculinity. Healy's parents were both in creative industries and "the kind of people that I aspired to be, happened to be gay": "I suppose it would make more sense for me to be gay or bi. But it's just kind of where I come from. I hope I never exploit that ... The idea of making a self who is cis, white and straight more interesting by aligning themselves with that culture really makes me wince."

Healy has had vision correction via LASIK surgery. He has been clinically diagnosed with ADHD. In a 2022 interview, he mentioned being in therapy, and referred to dealing with trauma from "some early sexual experiences that, as [he] got older, were really, really difficult to deal with." Healy is a recovering heroin addict, and has also had issues with cocaine and benzodiazepine abuse. In late 2017, he spent seven weeks at an in-patient drug rehabilitation clinic in Barbados, following an intervention by his bandmates. He has spoken openly about his drug use: "I don't want to fetishize it, because it's really dull and it's really dangerous. The thought of being to a young person what people like Burroughs were to me when I was a teenager makes me feel ill." As of 2022, Healy still smokes cannabis.

== Discography ==
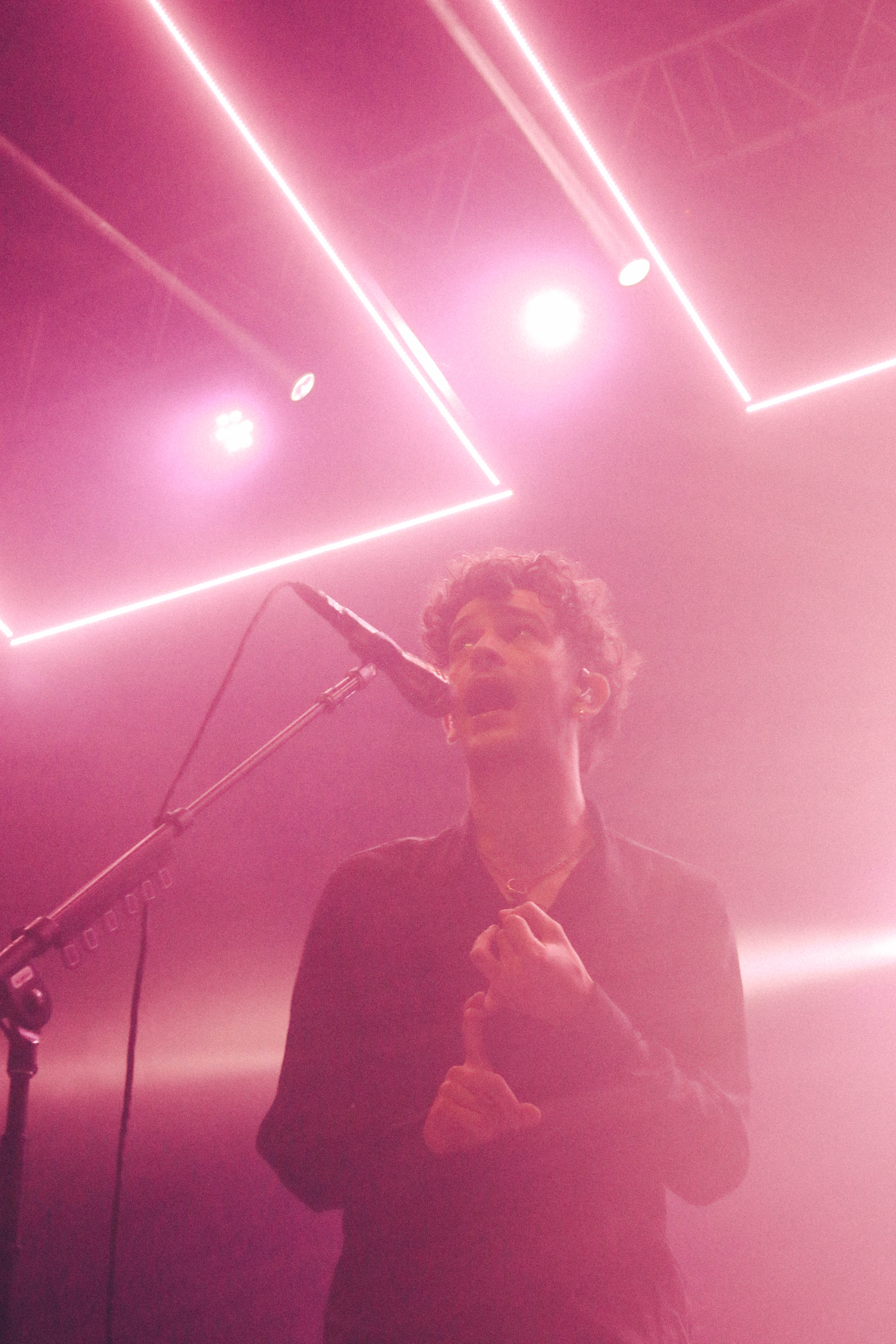
Healy performing in Argentina in 2017

=== The 1975 ===
==== Extended plays ====
- Facedown (2012)
- Sex (2012)
- Music for Cars (2013)
- IV (2013)

==== Studio albums ====
- The 1975 (2013)
- I Like It When You Sleep, for You Are So Beautiful yet So Unaware of It (2016)
- A Brief Inquiry into Online Relationships (2018)
- Notes on a Conditional Form (2020)
- Being Funny in a Foreign Language (2022)

=== Truman Black ===
- "And Then the Sand We Sink In" (2023)
- "Loads of Crisps" (2024)

=== Other work ===
- 2015 – The Japanese House – Pools to Bathe In EP (co-producer)
- 2015 – The Japanese House – Clean EP (co-producer)
- 2017 – The Japanese House – Saw You in a Dream EP (co-producer)
- 2018 – Pale Waves – My Mind Makes Noises (co-writer and co-producer of "Television Romance" and ''There's a Honey")
- 2018 – No Rome – RIP Indo Hisashi EP (co-producer, vocals for "Narcissist")
- 2019 – No Rome – Crying in the Prettiest Places EP (co-producer)
- 2021 – Beabadoobee – Our Extended Play EP (co-producer)
- 2021 – Holly Humberstone – "Please Don't Leave Just Yet" (co-writer, co-producer)
- 2021 – No Rome – "Spinning" (vocals, co-writer, co-producer)
- 2022 – FKA Twigs – "Pamplemousse" (additional vocals)
- 2022 – Holly Humberstone – "Sleep Tight" (co-writer)
- 2022 – Beabadoobee – Beatopia (co-writer for "Pictures of Us" and "You're Here That's the Thing", vocals, guitar)
- 2023 – The Japanese House – "Sunshine Baby" (backing vocals)
- 2023 – The Japanese House – "Boyhood" (guitar, additional drums)
- 2024 – Bleachers – "Hey Joe" (piano)
- 2024 – Charli XCX – "I might say something stupid featuring the 1975 & jon hopkins" (co-writer, vocals)
- 2024 – Coldplay – "The Karate Kid" (additional production)
- 2026 – Tiny Habits – "Anything He Was" (backing vocals)

== Videography ==
- 2017 – "Television Romance" Music Video – Director
- 2018 – "Ashleigh" Music Video – Co-director
- 2019 – "Frail State of Mind" Music Video – Co-director
- 2022 – "I'm In Love With You" Music Video – Creative director, writer
- 2022 – "Happiness" – Creative director

== Tours ==
- The 1975 Tour (2013–2015)
- I Like It When You Sleep Tour (2016–2017)
- Music for Cars Tour (2018–2020)
- At Their Very Best (2022–2023, also writer and director)
- Still... At Their Very Best (2023–2024, also writer and director)

== Accolades ==
Among Healy's accolades are four Brit Awards, and two Ivor Novello Awards including Songwriter of the Year. He has also been nominated twice for the Mercury Prize and Grammy Awards.
