= There's a Honey =

- Cover for the promo single

Single by Pale Waves

from the album My Mind Makes Noises
- Released: 20 February 2017
- Recorded: 2017
- Genre: Indie pop
- Length: 3:47 (initial release); 3:51 (album remix)
- Label: Dirty Hit
- Songwriters: Ciara Doran; Heather Baron-Gracie
- Producers: Matthew Healy; George Daniel

Pale Waves singles chronology
"There's a Honey" (2017)	"Television Romance" (2017)

Music video
- "There's a Honey" on YouTube

"There's a Honey" is the debut single by English indie pop band Pale Waves. The track was released through Dirty Hit on 20 February 2017 as the lead single for their debut studio album, My Mind Makes Noises (2018). Written by Pale Waves members Heather Baron-Gracie and Ciara Doran, the track's production was handled by the 1975 band members, Matty Healy and George Daniel. Lyrically, the song discusses insecurities and doubt in a romantic relationship. A music video for "There's a Honey", directed by Silent Tapes, was released on 11 April 2017. The video is performance based and took visual inspiration from the American sculptor Daniel Wurtzel.

After its initial release, "There's a Honey" was re-issued on 10 November 2017 as a limited-edition double 7", coupled with "Television Romance". Upon its re-release, it debuted at 83 on the Scottish Singles Chart on 17 November and at 2 on the UK Vinyl Singles and UK Singles Sales Charts. In 2018, the song was remixed and included on the band's first album, My Mind Makes Noises. Critical reception to "There's a Honey" was largely positive, with several publications praising the debut single's hook, its sonic nature, and its overall catchiness; additionally, at the end of 2017, the music outlets NME and The Line of Best Fit both ranked "There's a Honey" as one of the best songs of the year.

== Composition ==
=== Background and production ===
"There's a Honey" (written by Heather Baron-Gracie and Ciara Doran) was recorded in January 2017, and it was produced by Matty Healy and George Daniel of the 1975. Healy first expressed interest in producing the single after Jamie Oborne (who managed both the 1975 and Pale Waves) played him a demo of the song (along with a demo of "Television Romance"). "After we hooked up with Dirty Hit we sent them [the songs]," Baron-Gracie explained in an interview with NME, "[Healy and Daniel] got in touch and were like, 'Let us just produce ['There's a Honey'] and if you like it or totally hate it you can decide what to do with it.'" Doran credits Healy and Daniel with "[taking] what [Pale Waves] had and [making] it sonically bigger." That said, when discussing how much of an impact Healy had on the band's sound, Baron-Gracie told NME: "I’ve seen online that a few people were giving them hate and saying they’ve changed us, but that’s just completely ridiculous. Our sound is just maturing at the end of the day."

When it came time to include "There's a Honey" on the band's debut studio album, My Mind Makes Noises (2018), the members of Pale Waves decided to remix both this song and "Television Romance". "When we were listening back to [original mixes of 'There's a Honey' and 'Television Romance'] it was pretty clear that we had to re-record them," Baron-Gracie explained in a feature with Ones to Watch. "We wanted it to sound like they were all recorded at the same time in the same studio and having the [original versions] on the album just wouldn't have worked." Ciara Doran and Jonathan Gilmore (the latter of whom produced the band's debut album) handled remixing duties.

=== Music and lyrics ===
A 20-second sample of "There's a Honey", demonstrating the track's "dreamy and dark" sound.

Lyrically, "There's a Honey" is, according to Baron-Gracie, "about a failed relationship, the sense of desperation, contrasting feelings and insecurities". In an article announcing the song's release, Ones to Watch writer Kristin Stahlke wrote that its "heavy lyrics" detailed the possibility of "physical interaction between two people", with the singer doubting their lover's "true motives". Musically, "There's a Honey" is an indie pop song in the key of D major and is played at a tempo of 122 beats per minute. In terms of sound and style, Baron-Gracie has described the song as being "dreamy and dark" like "something you could hear off a movie track", and "a bit [like] shoegaze but pop at the same time". The song's main riff was played on a 12-string Vox Phantom guitar owned by Matty Healy.

== Music video ==
Pale Waves performing in the music video for "There's a Honey". According to Baron-Gracie, the video's aesthetic was inspired by the art of the American sculptor Daniel Wurtzel.

The music video for "There's A Honey" was directed by Silent Tapes and released on 11 April 2017. Matty Healy of the 1975 assisted the band as creative director, with Duane Nasis serving as the video's art director. The music video for "There's a Honey" is performance-based and features the band playing under the cover of a sheet that PromoNews likened to a "dreamlike" playground parachute of "pink and blue hues". Footage of the band's performance is also interspersed with several close-up shots of each band member engulfed in various lighting effects. In an interview with DIY magazine, Baron-Gracie discussed the video's style and design choices, explaining: "For the first Pale Waves video we wanted to create something that was minimal and beautiful. Drawing inspiration from American sculptor Daniel Wurtzel, [it is] romantic yet [it] evok[es] a feeling of claustrophobia". As of November 2026, the video has been viewed over 7.6 million times on YouTube.

== Release and reception ==
=== Commercial release ===
"There's a Honey" was released on 20 February 2017, via digital download and streaming services in various countries by Dirty Hit. While discussing the release with Coup de Main magazine, Baron-Gracie and Doran noted that they initially had planned to release a different song as their debut single. These plans were disrupted when the band recorded "There's a Honey", which they felt had "developed into something that really represented [them] as people". "There's a Honey" was re-released on 10 November 2017 as a 7" double A-side single with the band's second single, "Television Romance", pressed on a limited edition white vinyl. Following its release, the "Television Romance"/"There's a Honey" double A-side debuted at number 83 on the Scottish Singles Chart, and at number 2 on the UK Vinyl Singles and UK Singles Sales Charts. As of May 2024, "There's a Honey" has been streamed 30.5 million times on Spotify.

=== Critical response ===
"There's a Honey" received positive reviews from critics upon release. In a four-out-of-five star review, Cécile Howard of The Edge called the song "an enchanting debut" and argued that it was "eerily catchy through its chilling vocals and unique perspective on a crumbling relationship". Writing for DIY, Will Richards wrote that the band's debut single was "laying down the chorus of the year so far" and that Pale Waves had "set themselves up for extremely big things". Mark Sutherland, the editor of Music Week, selected the song as his personal track of 2017 and wrote that no other song from the year managed to "get close to ['There's a Honey'] in terms of sky-kissing ‘90s-style alt-rock majesty". Sutherland further wrote that the song "has the edge as the most brilliantly bristling-with-intent debut single in an age, as poppy as it is Gothy and a rare instantly-irresistible song that will stay with you forever."

On April 13, 2017, Stereogum named the song one of the week's "Pop Five", hailing it as a "gem of a single." On 27 November 2017, NME positioned "There's a Honey" at number 22 on their "Tracks of The Year 2017" list, describing the song as having "a bloody brilliant festival-ready chorus". The magazine further argued that the track has "a juggernaut riff [that] gets things off to a killer start and soon after, Baron-Gracie's heavenly vocals prove to cast an utterly bewitching and unbreakable spell". On their Best Fifty Songs of 2017, Line of Best Fit positioned "There's a Honey" at number 24, writing that the song "jangles with the optimistic, effervescent energy of the best breed of indie-pop".

=== Year-end lists ===
Publication	Rank	Ref.
NME Single of the Year (2017)	22	
The Line of Best Fit: Best Fifty Songs of 2017	24	

== Live performances ==
A month after the single's release, Pale Waves performed "There's a Honey" for BBC Music Introducing, with other notable performances occurring at the 2018 NME Awards and BBC Radio 1's Big Weekend in 2019. In the years since its release, "There’s a Honey" has become a staple of Pale Wave's live setlist (Dork magazine has referred to it as "their calling card"), and it is often performed during the band's encore. Via YouTube, the band has also released two live videos of the song: the first was filmed in 2018 during the Great Escape Festival at Brighton and Hove, and the second was filmed in 2019 during the band's show in Manchester.

== Track listing ==
Download, streaming (2017)
No.	Title	Length
1.	"There's a Honey"	3:47

7" (AA re-release)
No.	Title	Length
1.	"Television Romance"	3:25
2.	"There's a Honey"	3:47

== Personnel ==
Credits adapted from the liner notes of My Mind Makes Noises.

Pale Waves

- Heather Baron-Gracie – vocals, rhythm guitar
- Ciara Doran – drums, synthesizers, programming
- Hugo Silvani – lead guitar
- Charlie Wood – bass

Additional musicians

- Jonathan Gilmore – programming

Technical

- George Daniel – production
- Matthew Healy – production
- Jonathan Gilmore – additional production
- Ciara Doran – additional production
- Joseph Rodgers – engineering
- Mark "Spike" Stent – mixing
- Robin Schmidt – mastering

== Charts ==
=== Weekly charts ===
Weekly chart performance for "Television Romance"/"There's a Honey"
Chart (2017)	Peak position
Scotland (OCC)	83
UK Physical Sales Chart (OCC)	2
UK Vinyl Chart (OCC)	2

== Release history ==
Country	Date	Format	Label	Catalog no.	Ref.
Various	20 February 2017	Digital download	Dirty Hit	—N/a	
Various	10 November 2017	LP	Dirty Hit	DH00258	
Various	14 September 2018	Streaming	Dirty Hit	—N/a	
