= Somebody Else (The 1975 song) =

Single by The 1975

from the album I Like It When You Sleep, for You Are So Beautiful yet So Unaware of It
- Released: 15 February 2016
- Recorded: 2015
- Genre: Electronic; R&B; synth-pop
- Length: 5:47
- Label: Dirty Hit; Polydor
- Songwriters: Matthew Healy; George Daniel; Adam Hann; Ross MacDonald
- Producers: Matthew Healy; George Daniel; Mike Crossey

The 1975 singles chronology
"Ugh!" (2016)	"Somebody Else" (2016)	"The Sound" (2016)

Music video
- "Somebody Else" on YouTube

"Somebody Else" is a song by English band The 1975 from their second studio album I Like It When You Sleep, for You Are So Beautiful Yet So Unaware of It (2016). The song was written by band members Matty Healy, George Daniel, Adam Hann, Ross MacDonald, with the first two handling the production alongside Mike Crossey. The song was the last one written for the album; Healy developed the song's lyrics in Los Angeles while in the back of a cab. The singer focused on the after-effects of a breakup, centered on the themes of jealousy and guilt. It was released on 16 February 2016 by Dirty Hit and Polydor Records as the fourth single from the album.

A slow jam, "Somebody Else" is a power ballad composed in the styles of electronic, R&B and synth-pop. The song contains elements of several genres, including house, chillwave, funk and neo-soul, with its sparse 1980s-style production incorporating synthesisers, 808 percussion, and techno beats. The lyrics explore the mixed emotions experienced after discovering a former lover has found a new partner, focusing on the themes of jealousy, grief, melancholia, and bitterness, among others.

Upon release, "Somebody Else" received widespread acclaim from contemporary music critics, several of whom deemed it the best song on I Like It When You Sleep, for You Are So Beautiful yet So Unaware of It. Reviewers praised the song's production quality, 1980s-style sound and lyrical depth, with some comparing it to the work of Tears for Fears. It later appeared on numerous year-end and decade-end lists, including ones published by NME, Pitchfork and The Times. The song peaked at number 55 on the UK Singles Chart, number eight on the US Billboard Hot Rock & Alternative Songs chart, number 29 in Scotland, number 34 in Australia and number 70 in Ireland. The song was later certified gold in Australia and the United States by the Australian Recording Industry Association (ARIA) and the Recording Industry Association of America (RIAA), respectively, while it received a platinum certification in the United Kingdom by the British Phonographic Industry (BPI).

An accompanying music video, directed by Tim Mattia, was released on 7 July 2016. The visual depicts Healy's attempts to move on from his former relationship, engaging in various situations that explore themes of isolation and self-obsession. The video received positive reviews from critics, who highlighted the cinematic quality, introspective style and twist ending, with several comparing it to the work of filmmaker David Lynch and the film Fight Club (1999). To promote "Somebody Else", The 1975 performed the song on tour and at various music festivals, including the Reading and Leeds Festivals and Pohoda. In addition to appearing in several films and television shows, such as 13 Reasons Why and The Edge of Seventeen (2016), the song has been covered by several artists including Charlie Puth, Vérité and Lorde, with the latter citing it as a significant influence on her second studio album, Melodrama (2017).

== Background and development ==
"I'm not proud of that jealousy but I think everybody struggles with that kind of ownership. Both sides feel that way when your partner of a certain amount of time goes off and is with someone else in a sexual or emotional way."

— Healy, on the theme of jealousy in "Somebody Else".

"Somebody Else" was the last song written for I Like It When You Sleep, for You Are So Beautiful yet So Unaware of It. Written in the back of a cab while Healy was in Los Angeles, the singer focused on the after-effects of a breakup, alongside the accompanying feelings of jealousy. Following the song's completion, Healy said: "As soon as I finished writing it, I was like 'This is a tune'." Explaining the concept further, Healy described the feeling as "guilty jealousy" to Steve Holden of BBC, which the singer said stems from no longer wanting a partner while also not wanting somebody else to be with them. In an interview with Shahlin Graves of Coup de Main, Healy agreed that he emotionally distances himself after writing personal songs such as "Somebody Else". The singer described the songwriting process as a form of catharsis, saying: "Once I put it in a song, I can objectively think about it – it exists outside of me and I can make sense of it a bit more."

== Music and lyrics ==
"Somebody Else"
A 30-second sample showcasing the chorus of "Somebody Else". In the lyrics, Healy deals with the melancholy and grief of seeing his former lover with somebody else, backed by a sparse 1980s-style production composed of a disco-influenced bass, 808 percussion and techno beats.

Musically, "Somebody Else" is a melancholic power ballad, composed as an electronic, R&B and synth-pop slow jam. The song has a length of five minutes and forty-seven seconds (5:47) and was written by The 1975 members George Daniel, Matty Healy, Adam Hann and Ross MacDonald, while the former two handled the production alongside Mike Crossey. According to the sheet music published at Musicnotes.com by Hal Leonard Music Publishing, "Somebody Else" is set in the time signature of common time with a downbeat tempo of 100 beats per minute. The track is composed in the key of C major, with Healy's vocals ranging between the notes of G_{3} and G_{4}. It follows a chord progression of F–G–Am7–E7–Am9–Am–C.

"Somebody Else" has a sparse 1980s-style production composed of a "bounc[ing]" synth line, heavy reverb, expansive atmospherics, whirling synthesiser washes, a disco-influenced bass, a kick drum, 808 percussion and techno beats. The song also contains elements of house, chillwave, electro, funk, neo-soul, electronica, dance, electropop, alternative pop, new wave, yacht rock and "digitized" soul. Throughout the track, Healy's vocals are pitch-altered, doubled, chopped and Auto-Tuned. The singer performs in a "breathy" style, according to Andy Gill of The Independent, while Nylon's Hayden Manders described the vocals as "lackadaisical, disinterested and wobbly".

Lyrically, "Somebody Else" deals with the after-effects of a breakup, expressing the pain of seeing a former lover with a new partner. The song describes being caught between the various emotional phases one experiences after the end of a relationship. The track is centred around the theme of loss, with Healy refusing to let go of the relationship for fear of loneliness. "Somebody Else" also deals with overcoming jealousy, as the singer does not want his partner to love someone else but takes solace from knowing she is not lonely. Pitchfork's Brad Nelson noted that, unlike The 1975's prior work, the band embodies "something less defined and more introspective" in the song, writing it explores feelings of confusion which one would normally suppress. Writing for Billboard, Rania Afitos felt the song moves through several stages of heartbreak, beginning with melancholy and grief before capturing Healy's "inevitable bitterness".

Tom Connick of DIY characterised the production of "Somebody Else" as gentle and "soft-of-touch" while writing that the lyrics see Healy "finally [laying] himself bare in the emotional sense, rather than just whipping off his top and skipping about". Manders noted the song eschews Healy's "theatrics" in favour of a "mellow" 1980s-indebted soundscape. Drowned in Sound writer Sean Adams compared the track to the works of Cut Copy and Chromatics. Writing for PopMatters, Pryor Stroud described "Somebody Else" as a merger of the "anthemic, multiplex synth-pop of Tears for Fears" with the "pretty-boy R&B" of Justin Bieber. The Irish Times writer Lauren Murphy also compared the track to the work of Tears for Fears. Dee Lockett of Vulture said the song's sexual tension, "slow-burning" sensuality and suspense is reminiscent of Tangerine Dream's "Love on a Real Train", (Note: Miswritten as "Love on a Dream" in the article) while also writing that it shares the same "control" as a Tears for Fears song. AllMusic writer Matt Collar compared the track to Tango in the Night (1987)-era Fleetwood Mac.

=== Structure and analysis ===
"Somebody Else" begins with "mournful" opening keyboard notes, two chords and chopped vocals. Nelson observed a "swerve" to the opening synths that sonically embodies post-breakup ambivalence, noting "a damp echo to the atmosphere that makes every instrument sound slightly hazy and drunk". In the verses, Healy narrates the melancholy and grief associated with the ending of a relationship, singing in a half-whisper: "I took all my things that make sound / The rest I could do without." Continuing the themes of melancholia and grief in the chorus, the singer depicts an experience of lost love: "I don't want your body / But I hate to think about you with somebody else / Our love has gone cold / You're intertwining your soul with somebody else." Realising his lover has changed and the relationship has come to an end, Healy sings: "I'm looking through you, while you’re looking through your phone." Characterised by a change in tempo, slower synths and distorted vocals, the song's bridge sees the singer's heartbreak shifting to bitterness around intimacy, as he exclaims: "Get someone you love? / Get someone you need? / Fuck that, get money / I can't give you my soul 'cause we're never alone."

In a retrospective analysis of The 1975's lyrics for NME, Connick stated that the chorus of "Somebody Else" was instrumental in shifting the public's opinion of the band, which he credits to being "a couplet that anyone can relate to". Furthermore, Connick wrote that the lyrics recontextualise the "teenage heartbreak" of The 1975 into a more mature tone. Stroud opined that Healy's constant assertions of indifference in the couplet "I don't want your body, I don't want your body" demonstrate an attempt by the singer to repress his desires. The writer noted that "the body" mentioned in the line serves as the song's motif, comparing its constant repetition to an addiction. Rather than viewing "the body" as an abstraction, Stroud interpreted it as representing "a specific flesh-on-flesh interaction" first detailed in The 1975's "Sex" (2012). In an essay analysing the band's songwriting techniques, Vice writer Emily Bootle noted that in "Somebody Else", the chorus' melodies use a larger gap in intervals—hopping between the fifth and third notes of its scale—which she credited as a critical component in their ability to craft "consistently catchy choruses". Regarding the song's bridge, Jennifer Irving of Consequence interpreted the lyrics as a commentary on love in the 21st century, representing society's inability to make time for intimacy. She wrote that instead of attempting to reconcile this dilemma, the bridge serves as Healy's acceptance of this notion, summarising: "Let's just distract ourselves and make money." In contrast to Irving's analysis, Vice writer Ian Cohen felt the couplet "fuck that, get money" is a defence mechanism.

== Release and critical reception ==
"Somebody Else" was officially released by Dirty Hit and Polydor Records as the fourth single from I Like It When You Sleep, for You Are So Beautiful yet So Unaware of It on 15 February 2016. 11 days later, the album was released, including the song as the 10th track.

Upon release, the song was met with widespread critical acclaim from contemporary music critics. Amy Davidson of Digital Spy and the editorial staff of both DIY and Vulture deemed "Somebody Else" one of the best new songs for the week ending 19 February 2016. Dork's Stephen Ackroyd said the track "remains one of British pop music's greatest recent triumphs", while Starr Bowenbank of Cosmopolitan said: "If you had to listen to one single piece of music for the rest of your life by [t]he 1975, it better be 'Somebody Else'." Collin Brennan of Consequence proclaimed "Somebody Else" the standout from I Like It When You Sleep, for You Are So Beautiful yet So Unaware of It; he lauded the "uncomfortably relatable" lyrics, "pristinely produced" hooks and emulation of 1980s musical excess while regarding it as "a bizarre single that somehow works beautifully". Spin writer Brian Josephs also named "Somebody Else" the record's best song, while The Sydney Morning Herald's Tim Bryon declared the song "perhaps the most impressive thing on the album". Both Annie Zaleski of The A.V. Club and Gill deemed "Somebody Else" an album highlight, with the latter calling it "one of the more genuinely moving break-up songs of recent years".

Describing "Somebody Else" as a "timeless" ballad, Amit Vaidya of Rolling Stone India deemed it the best song of The 1975's career; she gave specific praise to the successful emulation of a 1980s-style sound: "If I placed this single with my Top 30 of 1988, it would fit it so perfectly, no one would know it didn’t come out 30 plus years ago!" Stereogum writer Chris DeVille praised the band's use of chillwave in the track, saying they "do pretty well with it too". Writing for The Fader, Steffanee Wang lauded "Somebody Else" as "incredibly" well-crafted; she praised the production, arrangements and euphoric tone, saying: "Is it crazy to say that if I could only listen to one song for the rest of my life, I’d pick this song?" Lorenzo Cabello of Euphoria Magazine assured that despite previously not enjoying The 1975's music, he "found [himself] helpless to their newfound sound", praising "Somebody Else" for its "encapsulating" production, "musical and lyrical muscles", and Healy's "sympathetic" and "longing" vocals. Manders commended the songs "enchanting" sound and emotional depth. Collar called the track "shimmeringly moody", while Rolling Stone's Jon Dolan praised its "moody sheen", writing this creates "an enjoyable balance of desire and distraction". Mitch Mosk of Atwood Magazine praised "Somebody Else" for "maintain[ing] an upbeat but hollow melody while being danceable all the while".

Emille Marvel of idobi wrote that "Somebody Else" is "a worthy contender for the best [t]he 1975 song of all time" while praising its "depressingly" dark lyrics and "cloudy pop vibes". Stroud declared it the best song on I Like It When You Sleep, for You Are So Beautiful yet So Unaware of It; he commended the track's lyrics for representing an "obsession" that sees Healy "teetering toward a full-on psychosexual breakdown". Writing for NME, Connick deemed "Somebody Else" one of the band's best songs and called it a "heartbreak hit like few others", praising the songwriting for exploring tropes of love, sex, death and drugs without succumbing to "longstanding cliches". Slant Magazine's Jonathan Wroble praised the song's "pulsating midnight balladry", calling it one of the album's moments of quiet and introspection that serves as a "rewarding [moment] of restraint". Describing the track as a "synth-laden masterpiece", Callie Alghrim of Insider commended its lyrical elegance, relatability and portrayal of nostalgia, misery, guilt, self-importance and betrayal, saying: "There is no other song in existence that evokes the same ultra-specific, exquisite emotion as 'Somebody Else.'" Writing for The Observer, Kitty Empire said "Somebody Else" is a "gem", while Renowned for Sound writer Jessica Thomas opined the song radiates "soulful passion, with deep, personal significance".

=== Accolades ===
"Somebody Else" has appeared on numerous publications' year-end and decade-end lists, including ones published by NME, Pitchfork and The Times. In DIY's annual Readers Poll, the track was deemed 2016's eighth-best song, and it was later nominated for Best Track at both the 2016 Q Awards and the 2017 NME Awards.

Critical rankings for "Somebody Else"
Critic/Organization	Time span	Rank	Published year
Consequence	Year-end	35	2016
The Diamondback	Decade-end	41	2019
DIY	Year-end	*	2016
Harriet Gibson (The Guardian)	Year-end	*	2016
iHeartRadio	Decade-end (Alternative rock)	*	2019
Insider	Decade-end	9	2019
NME	Year-end	2	2016
NME	Decade-end	18	2019
Pitchfork	Year-end	74	2016
Popjustice	Year-end	3	2016
Rolling Stone India	Decade-end	22	2019
ShortList	Year-end	1	2016
Stacker	Year-end (Rock)	10	2017
The Times	Decade-end	*	2020
Variance	Year-end	19	2016

== Commercial performance ==
In the United Kingdom, "Somebody Else" peaked at number 55 on the UK Singles Chart and remained in the Top 100 for 11 weeks, standing as The 1975's second most commercially successful release up to May 2020. The song also reached number 29 in Scotland. The track was later certified platinum by the British Phonographic Industry (BPI) on 21 February 2020, denoting over 600,000 certified units in the UK. As of May 2020, "Somebody Else" has sold a combined 633,000 copies in the country, including 60.7 million streams. Elsewhere in Europe, the song peaked at number 70 in Ireland. In Australia, the track debuted and peaked at number 34, becoming the band's highest-charting single. "Somebody Else" was later certified gold by the Australian Recording Industry Association (ARIA), denoting over 35,000 certified units in Australia.

In the United States, "Somebody Else" reached number eight on the US Billboard Hot Rock & Alternative Songs chart. It was later ranked at number 41 on the chart's 2016 year-end edition and number 50 on the 2017 year-end edition. The song peaked at number 10 on the Billboard Rock Airplay chart and was later ranked at number 32 on the chart's 2017 year-end edition. Additionally, the track reached number 20 on the Billboard Bubbling Under Hot 100 Singles chart and number 28 on the Billboard Adult Top 40 chart. "Somebody Else" was later certified gold by the Recording Industry Association of America (RIAA), denoting over 500,000 certified units in the US.

As of 2024 the song has accumulated more than 760 million streams on Spotify, making it the band’s most successful song on the platform.

== Music video ==
=== Development and release ===
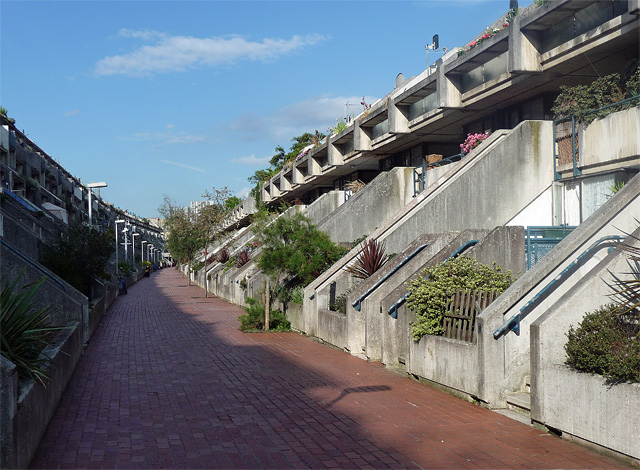
The music video for "Somebody Else" was filmed at the Alexandra Road Estate.

To create the music video for "Somebody Else", The 1975 worked alongside director Tim Mattia. Healy said that despite not having synesthesia, he could visualise what colour a song is: "Not in a pretentious, wanky way but there’s an element to it." Describing himself as having a visual brain, he wrote the song's lyrics while also drafting a video treatment. Speaking to Dork, Healy said he knew how the video for the track would be lit while writing the lyrics. Having developed the visual's concept and storyline, the singer collaborated with Mattia for the video's direction, a process he praised as "surreal".

Speaking to Holden, Healy described the development of the music video as an "intense creative process". Filming occurred at the Alexandra Road Estate, a housing estate in the London Borough of Camden. Due to the visual's narrative structure, The 1975 shot "almost two or three videos". Healy was required to wear a wig and a dress for a sex scene with himself, which he described as "quite interesting". To achieve the desired shot, the singer filmed the scene with a man dressed as himself, saying, "It's 2016, there are no fears about that". On 6 July 2016, the band revealed that the music video for "Somebody Else" would debut the following day via an Instagram post containing a teaser from the video. Describing the video in a press release, The 1975 said it focuses on Healy's struggle with "self obsession in the face of heart-break" while exploring a "Lynchian night-time London". The visual was released on 7 July 2016.

=== Synopsis ===
The music video begins with a three-minute vignette that plays before the primary video. The setup and development of the vignette is heavily inspired by the work of David Lynch, in particular, his short horror webseries Rabbits. The black and white vignette opens with Healy entering a grim hotel room, reminiscent of a retro TV show set, where a woman who never moves is sitting on the couch. The singer performs several menial tasks in a lethargic manner; he washes away clown makeup from his face, takes off his suit jacket and shirt, ties his shoes and studies himself in a mirror. Foreboding music and an inappropriate laugh track play in the background, featuring cheers, sitcom-esque applause and the occasional boo from an unseen studio audience. Healy then walks toward the couch, sitting down beside the motionless woman while getting dressed. The singer stares at the woman and attempts to have a conversation, although she does not respond, and he picks up his belongings and heads out the door with his skateboard. Althea Legaspi of Rolling Stone felt the vignette's bleak setting serves as a thematic continuation from the visual for fellow album track "A Change of Heart", while Dork's editorial staff viewed it as a literal continuation of the prior video.

In the video's twist ending, the stripper Healy engages in sexual intercourse with is revealed to actually be himself.

As "Somebody Else" begins to play, signifying the beginning of the primary video, the visual changes from black and white to colour. Healy leaves for a dark and desolate town with his skateboard, dressed in a black and leather ensemble. The singer wanders lost and alone while dealing with an increasingly fragmented mental state, with the visual following him through a series of events while he grieves over heartbreak. Healy spends time trying to get over his lover in solitude and finds himself in different situations, each of which contains elements of self-obsession and feelings of isolation. First, Healy visits a diner where he breaks down into tears while two fellow patrons watch. The singer then traverses alleyways, cabs and deserted city streets and later falls off of his skateboard, while clips of him singing in the back of a car are interspersed.

The video showcases the after-effects of drowning in sorrow and alcohol; arriving at a local bar, Healy drinks heavily and sings karaoke while acting foolishly. The singer steals a pair of sunglasses from a fellow patron before performing on stage, where his compounding loneliness leads to him hallucinating seeing his former lover in a group of hecklers. A visibly confused Healy abruptly ends his performance and the hecklers follow him to the parking lot, where they jump the singer and leave him beaten and bloodied. Healy then visits a strip club where he meets his perfect woman. The singer and the stripper share several drinks and she gives him a lap dance before the pair leave the club to have sex in a car. However, in a twist ending, Healy is revealed to be having sex with himself. Revisiting the preceding events of the video, the singer "becomes that someone else", according to Jarod Johnson II of Paste; Healy sees himself as one of the patrons at the diner and the woman at the karaoke bar. The singer is shown dancing and leaving by himself at the strip club, before the video concludes with Healy alone in the car.

=== Critical response ===
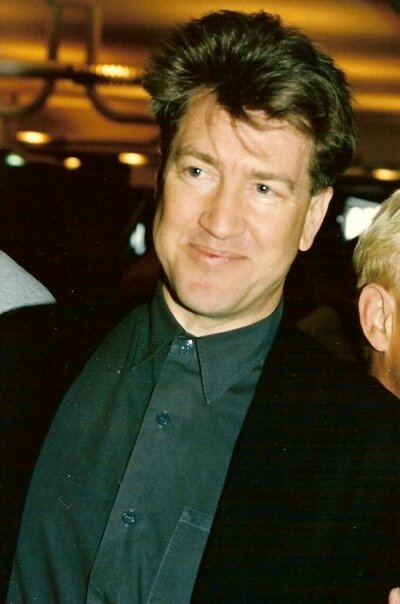
Several critics compared the music video to the work of surrealist filmmaker David Lynch.

Grant Sharples of Alternative Press included "Somebody Else" at number two on his list of ten music videos from The 1975 that should be made into feature-length films. In addition to declaring it one of the band's most experimental visuals, Sharples praised the vignette for "speak[ing] to how, when depressed, going about life's basic functions feels like an immense effort". Soundigest writer Amanda Larrison interpreted the video's focus to be on Healy's heartbreak and "demons" and included it at number eight on the publication's list of the band's ten most creative videos. Writing for MTV News, Madeline Roth called the visual colourful and "ominous", noting that the twist ending is "totally unexpected" and viewers "have to see [it] to believe [it]". Comparing the "dark" music video to the work of David Lynch, Davidson called it "an excellent new music video to add to [the band's] repertoire" while also highlighting the "surreal" ending. Gigwise writer Alexandra Pollard called the visual strange and wrote that it "take[s] a turn for the weird" during the "bizarre" twist ending.

Gil Kaufman of Billboard commended the "epic [and] lonely" music video and deemed it a mini-movie, saying the visual emulates the "absurdly" long and narrative-driven videos characteristic of Michael Jackson. Legaspi asserted the visual has an introspective style while writing it contains a different "vibe" in comparison to the "defiantly upbeat" music video for fellow album track "The Sound". Rachel Sonis of Idolator said the visual "seems to pick up where the grim visual for 'A Change Of Heart' left off" while calling it "trippy" and drawing comparisons between the video's ending and the work of Lynch. Writing for Euphoria Magazine, Christine Nguyen praised the visual's cinematic quality, production and Healy's "striking and convincing" acting, comparing the music video to Lynch and Fight Club (1999). Promonews writer David Knight called the vignette intriguing while deeming the primary visual reminiscent of the film.

Jisselle Fernandez of B-Sides said the accompanying music video does "Somebody Else" "justice", while Josephs felt it matches the song's "moodiness", writing: "The wearing-a-leather-jacket-in-the-night life ain't easy." The Dork editorial staff wrote that the visual focuses on Healy's struggle to accept what is occurring around him, noting its "spiral into darkness" showcases a "dark descent of an evening and the most terrifying version of swapped faces since Face/Off". Lindsay Howard of Variance described the video as strange and emotional, writing that it showcases the singer's literal struggles with self-obsession and heartbreak. Deeming the music visual odd and strange, The Fader writer Ben Danridge-Lemco said it is both an examination of narcissism and a representation of Healy's journey to find himself, writing the track itself functions as his soundtrack. Peter Helman of Stereogum commented that the visual is similar to Father John Misty's "The Night Josh Tillman Came To Our Apartment" (2015) and Young Thug's "Best Friend" (2015), deeming it "another solid entry into the pantheon of 'musician fucks himself' music videos".

== Live performances and other usage ==
Prior to its release, The 1975 performed "Somebody Else" at a December 2015 show in Philadelphia and incorporated pink lighting. In September 2016, they performed the song at the Leeds Festival, with Gigwise deeming it the highlight of their set. The 1975 performed the track on the 8 November 2016 episode of Late Night with Seth Meyers alongside "A Change of Heart". The following year, "Somebody Else" was included as part of the band's headlining setlist for the Reading Festival. In July 2019, the band performed the song at Pohoda. Regarding the performance, Elly Watson of DIY said, "honestly, name a more compelling thing than 30,000 people chanting 'FUCK THAT GET MONEY'". "Somebody Else" was used in 13 Reasons Why, The Edge of Seventeen and Love Island.

=== Cover versions ===
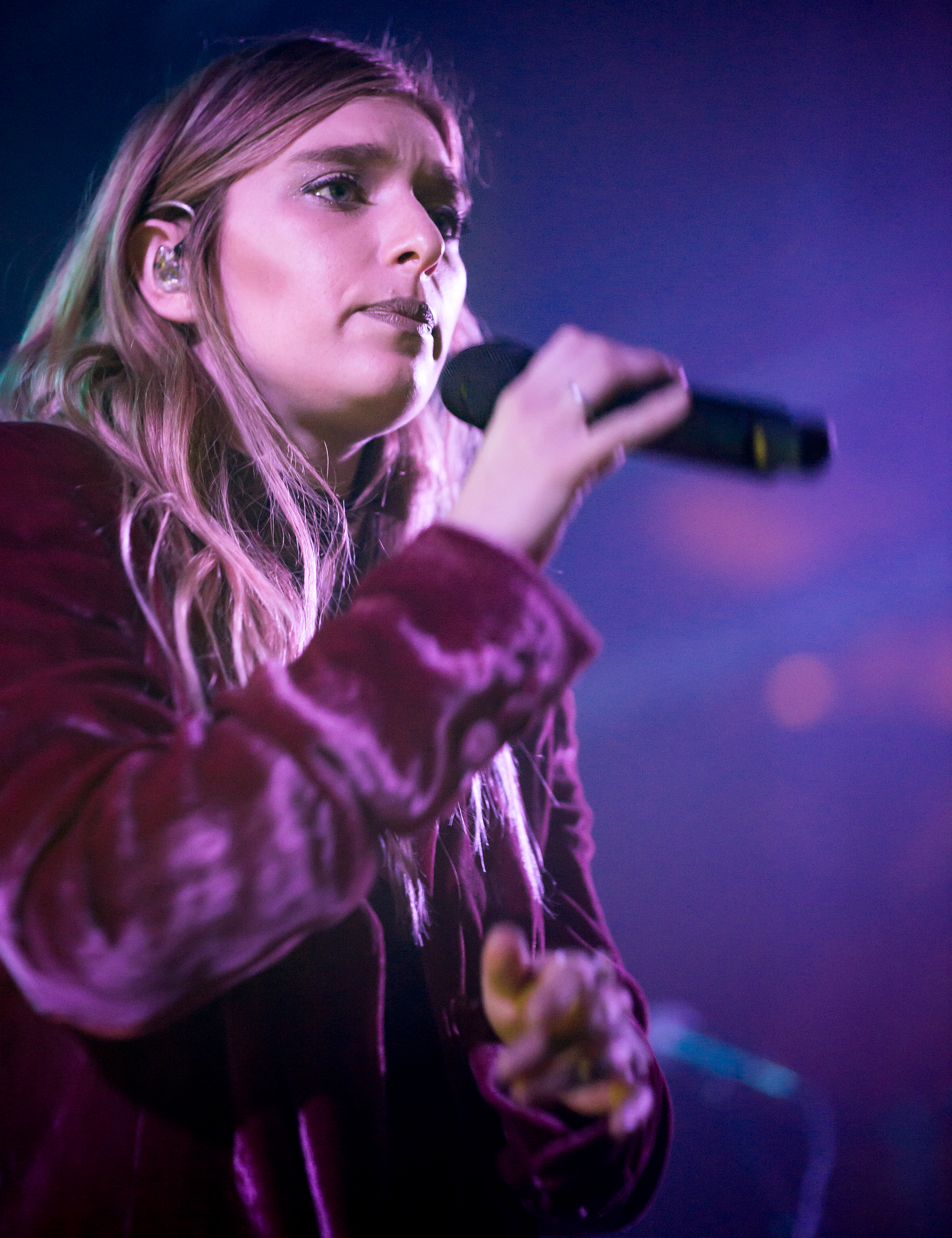
Vérité released a cover version of "Somebody Else" to SoundCloud in September 2016.

American singer Charlie Puth performed a cover of "Somebody Else" for his BBC Radio 1 Live Lounge set in September 2016. American musician Vérité released a cover of the song on 9 September 2016 to her SoundCloud. While praising the track's simplicity, relatability and songwriting, the musician asserted she "really wanted to take it into [her] world and reinterpret it a bit". Vérité's rendition features a faster rhythm and incorporates a "club-ready" beat, deep, oscillating bass and propulsive synths. The musician uses subdued, minimalist instrumentation in the verses, while the chorus is rooted in pop music and features an EDM-like drop. Regarding Vérité's cover, Amy McCann of Variance called it "delectable" and "breathtaking" while specifically highlighting her vocal performance. In February 2017, English indie rock group Circa Waves performed a rock and roll rendition of "Somebody Else" for MistaJam on BBC Radio 1. In June 2017, Holden accidentally played his vinyl copy of I Like It When You Sleep, for You Are So Beautiful yet So Unaware of It at double speed, discovering the song sounds similar to the work of Scottish synth-pop group Chvrches. After tweeting about the discovery, Chvrches member Martin Doherty humorously replied, asking if the opposite was also true. The group later performed their own rendition of the track in BBC Radio 1's Live Lounge on 15 March 2018.

At the le Zénith show in Paris on 5 October 2017, New Zealand musician Lorde performed "Somebody Else" as part of the setlist for her Melodrama World Tour. For her rendition, the musician used a near-identical arrangement rather than paring the song down. Roth praised Lorde's "fittingly dreamy" cover and complimented the track's sonic connection to Lorde's Melodrama (2017). Junkee declared it the musician's fifth-best cover; Jules Lefevre echoed Roth's comments regarding the similarities between "Somebody Else" and the music on Melodrama. American singer-songwriter Conan Gray uploaded a cover of the song to YouTube on 18 February 2018. Gray's performance featured oversaturated pink and purple lights reminiscent of the artwork for I Like It When You Sleep, for You Are So Beautiful yet So Unaware of It, and he incorporated layered vocals in the chorus. The singer-songwriter called the song a personal favourite from the band and described his version as "a little more sombre and not as well played on guitar", saying it "is one of those songs that no matter who you are and where you are in life, you can’t help but think of someone in your past when it plays". In the publication's list of Gray's Top Five Favourite Covers, Soundigest ranked his performance of the track at number one; Courtney Gould commended the video's lighting and his vocals for "highlight[ing] the dynamic details that make this song so special".

In March 2020, American Idol season 18 contestant Adam Curry performed "Somebody Else" for Hollywood Week. Curry's rendition of the song received praise for its "artistry" and "legitimacy", with Robbie Daw of Billboard writing the singer "knock[ed] everyone out with a solid rendition" of the track. On 7 May 2020, The Face hosted a tribute concert via Instagram for The 1975 to recognise their influence on contemporary artists. Several artists performed covers of the band's songs; Gracie Abrams was chosen to perform "Somebody Else". Korean-New Zealand singer Rosé, a member of K-pop girl group Blackpink, performed the track as part of an Instagram Live mini-concert on 17 May 2020, closing out the show.

== Legacy ==
"Somebody Else" is considered one of the band's greatest songs and has been labelled a "breakup anthem". Johnson II ranked the track at number 17 on Paste's list of The 1975's essential songs and said its lyrics "highlight the splintered emotions that make breakups a process". Vulture's Larry Fitzmaurice included "Somebody Else" in his list of 10 Essential 1975 Songs; he compared the song's production to a John Hughes' film, calling it a "straightforwardly beautiful ballad" and "an unrequited-love slow-dance classic for the ages". In a ranking of the band's ten best songs, NME listed the track at number five. The same publication also included the chorus of "Somebody Else" in a list of the band's most genius lyrics. In their list compiling the best bridges of the 21st century, Billboard ranked the song at number 86. Regarding fan reception, Consequence also noted the bridge to be among the band's 10 fan-favourite lyrics, having inspired merchandise featuring the couplet. The track is frequently included in numerous publications "best-of" lists regarding breakups, heartbreak and sadness, including those published by B-Sides, Cosmopolitan, Glamour, Seventeen and Women's Health. Don't Bore Us declared "Somebody Else" one of the seven-best breakup songs of the decade, while A.Side deemed it one of the 15 best breakup songs of the 2010s.

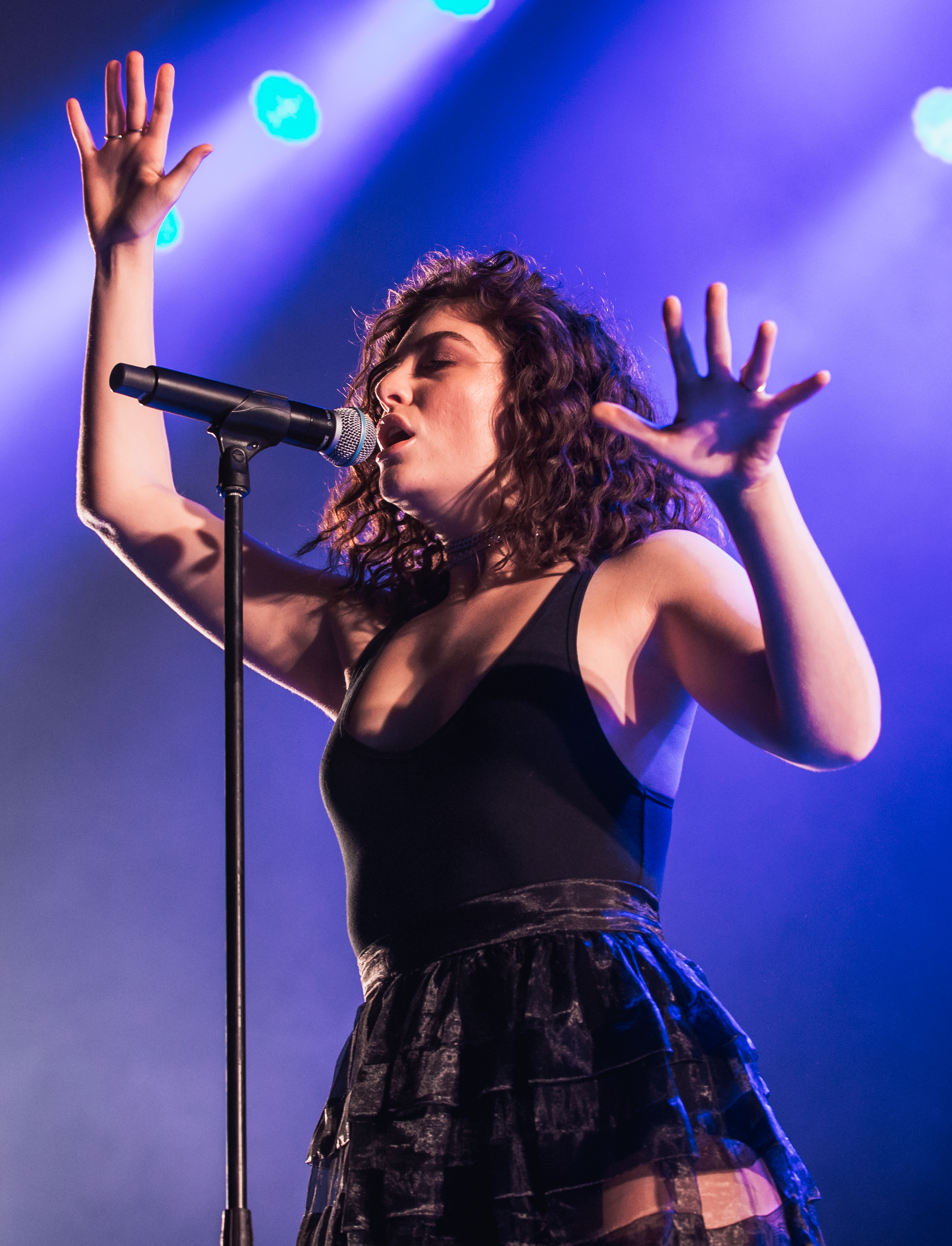
New Zealand musician Lorde has cited "Somebody Else" as a major influence on her second album Melodrama (2017).

Puth spoke about "Somebody Else" in a 2016 interview with Michael Baggs of BBC, revealing it was the one song he wished to have penned himself. The singer praised the track's simplicity, chord structure and Healy's vocals, telling Baggs: "I love the way [The 1975] paint a picture lyrically. They're not so concerned with using huge words, it's more like getting into people's hearts with nostalgia." In a 2017 interview with NME, Lorde spoke about how "Somebody Else" inspired her, having previously revealed it was her most-played song of the year on Spotify. The musician was surprised by the track's "emotional potency", saying she related to it despite the songwriters being a group of men. Lorde further praised the production intricacies, groove and "celestial" emotional connection between the lyrics and composition, telling the magazine: "The power ['Somebody Else'] has over me is quite remarkable." The musician has stated that the song "really influenced" Melodrama, specifically impacting the album's "tones and the colours and the emotions".

Canadian indie pop band Valley told Direct Lyrics' Kevin Apaza in 2018 that the band wished they could have written and recorded the song for themselves; they highlighted the track's chord progression, Healy's vocals and contrast between the sad lyrics and the production's dance influence. In an E! Online interview with Billy Nilles, Canadian singer Tate McRae was asked to choose only one song to listen to for the rest of her life and picked "Somebody Else". Speaking on the track, the singer said: "It's my go-to driving song whenever I kinda feel like my world is falling apart." Roisin Lanigan of i-D identified the song as part of an emerging ASMR trend on YouTube and TikTok known as "from another room edits". The edits, described as part of a new "uber-specific" genre, are played through a muffled and distant filter. For "Somebody Else", the edit is designed to simulate hearing the track as if "[the listener is] making out in the bathroom of a party". In an essay analysing the sudden viral success of Olivia Rodrigo's "Drivers License" (2021), Paper writer Larisha Paul identified "Somebody Else" as one of three contributing factors, saying: "It's also clear that [Rodrigo] comes from the generation of young adults who swayed beneath pink LED lights to [t]he 1975's 'Somebody Else.'"

== Credits and personnel ==
Credits adapted from I Like It When You Sleep, for You Are So Beautiful yet So Unaware of It album liner notes.

- Matthew Healy – composer, producer, electric guitar, keyboards, vocals, background vocals
- George Daniel – composer, producer, programming, drums, keyboards, synthesiser
- Adam Hann – composer, electric guitar
- Ross MacDonald – composer
- Mike Crossey – producer, mixer
- Jonathan Gilmore – recording engineer
- Chris Gehringer – mastering engineer

== Charts ==
=== Weekly charts ===
Chart performance for "Somebody Else"
Chart (2016)	Peak position
Australia (ARIA)	34
Ireland (IRMA)	70
Scottish Singles Sales (Official Charts)	29
UK Singles (Official Charts)	55
US Bubbling Under Hot 100 (Billboard)	20
US Adult Pop Airplay (Billboard)	28
US Hot Rock & Alternative Songs (Billboard)	8
US Rock & Alternative Airplay (Billboard)	10

=== Year-end charts ===
2016 year-end chart performance for "Somebody Else"
Chart (2016)	Position
US Hot Rock & Alternative Songs (Billboard)	41

2017 year-end chart performance for "Somebody Else"
Chart (2017)	Position
US Hot Rock & Alternative Songs (Billboard)	50
US Rock Airplay (Billboard)	32

== Certifications ==
Certifications and sales for "Somebody Else"
Region	Certification	Certified units/sales
Australia (ARIA)	Gold	35,000^{‡}
Brazil (Pro-Música Brasil)	Platinum	60,000^{‡}
Denmark (IFPI Danmark)	Gold	45,000^{‡}
Portugal (AFP)	Gold	5,000^{‡}
Spain (Promusicae)	Gold	30,000^{‡}
United Kingdom (BPI)	2× Platinum	1,200,000^{‡}
United States (RIAA)	2× Platinum	2,000,000^{‡}
^{‡} Sales+streaming figures based on certification alone.

== See also ==
- The 1975 discography
- List of songs by Matty Healy
