= Mike Crossey =

Northern Irish musician (born 1979)

- Born: 1979 (age 45–46)
- Origin: Belfast, Northern Ireland
- Genres: Rock; indie rock; electropop; dance-pop; synth-pop
- Occupations: Record producer; songwriter; mixing engineer
- Years active: 2000–present

Mike Crossey (born 1979) is a Northern Irish record producer, songwriter, and mixing engineer. He produced the debut single by Arctic Monkeys, collaborating with them over two albums. He is known for his ongoing relationship with The 1975, in addition to productions with Jeremy Zucker, Twenty One Pilots, Walk the Moon, LANY, LAUV, Foals, Keane, Jake Bugg, The Gaslight Anthem, MUNA, Wolf Alice, Nothing But Thieves and Yungblud.

== Career ==
Crossey started his career as a promoter of punk shows in Belfast before moving to Liverpool to complete his training at Liverpool Institute for Performing Arts. He remained in Liverpool, operating out of the Motor Museum, until 2012. Crossey credited the studio's owner, OMD frontman Andy McCluskey, with being a "great mentor". During that period Crossey produced some of the most critically acclaimed British indie acts.

After seeing the Arctic Monkeys perform, he invited them to the studio and cut the band's first EP Five Minutes with Arctic Monkeys . He contributed production on the second album, Favourite Worst Nightmare, which includes singles such as "Teddy Picker", "Fluorescent Adolescent" and "Brianstorm"

He has since produced and mixed albums by Nothing but Thieves, Foals, Keane, Jake Bugg, Tribes, Blood Red Shoes, The Enemy, The Kooks, and Razorlight.

After studying the sonic nature of BBC Radio One's transmissions, frequency and compression, Mike has developed a solid reputation of creating separate radio mixes specifically suited for the channel. He has done so for acts such as The Black Keys.

=== 2012–2015: Mixing for The 1975, Twenty One Pilots, Jake Bugg, Wolf Alice ===
Moving to London in 2012, Crossey embarked on an ambitious year. He mixed the acclaimed Ben Howard album Every Kingdom and Two Door Cinema Club's sophomore Beacon.

Working with a young Nottingham songwriter Jake Bugg, Crossey produced and mixed the singer's eponymous debut album Jake Bugg, which was certified platinum in the UK. The album was a commercial and critical success – receiving a 9/10 in NME and 81/100 on metacritic.

In 2012, Crossey produced the Top 10 album for The View's Cheeky for a Reason and mixed The Courteeners' third album ANNA which debuted at number two.

He produced Manchester act The 1975's self-titled debut album, the American band The Gaslight Anthem's fifth album Get Hurt and the track "The Judge" from Twenty One Pilots' fourth studio album, Blurryface.

Crossey also produced the Wolf Alice album My Love Is Cool in 2015 which received a 9/10 score from NME.

=== 2015–2019: Producing for The 1975, Nothing But Thieves, Walk The Moon, MUNA, Half Alive ===
Relocating to Los Angeles in 2015, he produced The 1975's second album, entitled I Like It When You Sleep, for You Are So Beautiful yet So Unaware of It- the album received critical praise upon its release in 2016.

In 2017, he steered Nothing But Thieves's second album Broken Machine, which he produced, mixed and contributing to writing.

He produced the third Walk the Moon album, What If Nothing, including single "One Foot" - the highest selling alternative single of the year.

In 2018, he continued his relationship with The 1975 - mixing the album while the band took over production detail. He produced LANY's second album, Malibu Nights, as well as an album for Billy Raffoul and mixed songs for Hozier. Crossey produced LAUV and LANY's collaborative track, "Mean It", which was released on 14 November 2019. He produced four songs on the 2019 Half Alive album, Now, Not Yet.

=== 2020–2022: Producing for YUNGBLUD, Noah Cyrus, Jake Wesley Rodgers, The Killers ===
Crossey continued to revisit productions or mixing with LANY and The 1975 on their albums in 2020.

He produced songs for YUNGBLUD, The Killers, Jeremy Zucker, Half Alive and Jake Wesley Rogers. His mix CV expanded to include albums by LAUV, Beabadoobee, The Wombats, and Bad Suns.

In 2022, he completed production and mixing of Noah Cyrus' debut solo album. He produced two tracks on Louis Tomlinson's second studio album including the single "Bigger Than Me".

=== 2023 - current: LANY, Chelsea Cutler ===
In mid 2023, Crossey completed production on LANY's album, while undertaking mixing on Chelsea Cutler's album.

His mix of Nothing But Thieves' album, Dead Club City, debuted at no1 on the UK chart.

== Songwriting and production discography ==
Title	Year	Artist(s)	Album	Credits
"Sex"	2013	The 1975	The 1975	Producer
"The 1975"	2013	The 1975	The 1975	Producer
"The City"	2013	The 1975	The 1975	Producer
"M.O.N.E.Y."	2013	The 1975	The 1975	Producer
"Chocolate"	2013	The 1975	The 1975	Producer
"Talk!"	2013	The 1975	The 1975	Producer
"An Encounter"	2013	The 1975	The 1975	Producer
"Heart Out"	2013	The 1975	The 1975	Producer
"Settle Down"	2013	The 1975	The 1975	Producer
"Robbers"	2013	The 1975	The 1975	Producer
"Girls"	2013	The 1975	The 1975	Producer
"12"	2013	The 1975	The 1975	Producer
"She Way Out"	2013	The 1975	The 1975	Producer
"Menswear"	2013	The 1975	The 1975	Producer
"Pressure"	2013	The 1975	The 1975	Producer
"Is There Somebody Who Can Watch You"	2013	The 1975	The 1975	Producer
"Giant Peach"	2015	Wolf Alice	My Love Is Cool	Producer
"Bros"	2015	Wolf Alice	My Love Is Cool	Producer
"You're a Germ"	2015	Wolf Alice	My Love Is Cool	Producer
"Turn to Dust"	2015	Wolf Alice	My Love Is Cool	Producer
"Your Loves Whore"	2015	Wolf Alice	My Love Is Cool	Producer
"Lisbon"	2015	Wolf Alice	My Love Is Cool	Producer
"Silk"	2015	Wolf Alice	My Love Is Cool	Producer
"Freazy"	2015	Wolf Alice	My Love Is Cool	Producer
"Swallowtail"	2015	Wolf Alice	My Love Is Cool	Producer
"Soapy Water"	2015	Wolf Alice	My Love Is Cool	Producer
"Fluffy"	2015	Wolf Alice	My Love Is Cool	Producer
"The Wonderwhy"	2015	Wolf Alice	My Love Is Cool	Producer
"Moaning Lisa Smile"	2015	Wolf Alice	My Love Is Cool	Producer
"Storms"	2015	Wolf Alice	My Love Is Cool	Producer
"Heavenly Creatures"	2015	Wolf Alice	My Love Is Cool	Producer
"We're Not the Same"	2015	Wolf Alice	My Love Is Cool	Producer
"Blush"	2015	Wolf Alice	My Love Is Cool	Producer
"She"	2015	Wolf Alice	My Love Is Cool	Producer
"Nosedive"	2015	Wolf Alice	My Love Is Cool	Producer
"90 Mile Beach"	2015	Wolf Alice	My Love Is Cool	Producer
"Baby Ain't Made of China"	2015	Wolf Alice	My Love Is Cool	Producer
"I Saw You (In A Corridor)"	2015	Wolf Alice	My Love Is Cool	Producer
"Every Cloud"	2015	Wolf Alice	My Love Is Cool	Producer
"White Leather"	2015	Wolf Alice	My Love Is Cool	Producer
"Leaving You"	2015	Wolf Alice	My Love Is Cool	Producer
"The Judge"	2015	Twenty One Pilots	Blurryface	Producer
"Love Me"	2015	The 1975	I Like It When You Sleep, for You Are; So Beautiful yet So Unaware of It	Producer
"UGH!"	2015	The 1975	I Like It When You Sleep, for You Are; So Beautiful yet So Unaware of It	Producer
"Somebody Else"	2016	The 1975	I Like It When You Sleep, for You Are; So Beautiful yet So Unaware of It	Producer
"The Sound"	2016	The 1975	I Like It When You Sleep, for You Are; So Beautiful yet So Unaware of It	Producer
"A Change of Heart"	2016	The 1975	I Like It When You Sleep, for You Are; So Beautiful yet So Unaware of It	Producer
"The 1975"	2016	The 1975	I Like It When You Sleep, for You Are; So Beautiful yet So Unaware of It	Producer
"She's American"	2016	The 1975	I Like It When You Sleep, for You Are; So Beautiful yet So Unaware of It	Producer
"If I Believe You"	2016	The 1975	I Like It When You Sleep, for You Are; So Beautiful yet So Unaware of It	Producer
"Please Be Naked"	2016	The 1975	I Like It When You Sleep, for You Are; So Beautiful yet So Unaware of It	Producer
"Lostmyhead"	2016	The 1975	I Like It When You Sleep, for You Are; So Beautiful yet So Unaware of It	Producer
"The Ballad of Me and My Brain"	2016	The 1975	I Like It When You Sleep, for You Are; So Beautiful yet So Unaware of It	Producer
"Loving Someone"	2016	The 1975	I Like It When You Sleep, for You Are; So Beautiful yet So Unaware of It	Producer
"I Like It When You Sleep, for You Are; So Beautiful yet So Unaware of It"	2016	The 1975	I Like It When You Sleep, for You Are; So Beautiful yet So Unaware of It	Producer
"This Must Be My Dream"	2016	The 1975	I Like It When You Sleep, for You Are; So Beautiful yet So Unaware of It	Producer
"Paris"	2016	The 1975	I Like It When You Sleep, for You Are; So Beautiful yet So Unaware of It	Producer
"Nana"	2016	The 1975	I Like It When You Sleep, for You Are; So Beautiful yet So Unaware of It	Producer
"She Lays Down"	2016	The 1975	I Like It When You Sleep, for You Are; So Beautiful yet So Unaware of It	Producer
"How to Draw"	2016	The 1975	I Like It When You Sleep, for You Are; So Beautiful yet So Unaware of It	Producer
"Cry Baby"	2016	Fickle Friends	Non-album single	Producer
"Brooklyn"	2016	Fickle Friends	You Are Someone Else	Co-writer; producer
"Hello Hello"	2017	Fickle Friends	You Are Someone Else	Co-writer; producer
"Boy"	2017	K.I.D	Tired All of Time	Co-writer; producer
"One Foot"	2017	Walk the Moon	What If Nothing	Producer
"Headphones"	2017	Walk the Moon	What If Nothing	Producer
"Press Restart"	2017	Walk the Moon	What If Nothing	Producer
"Surrender"	2017	Walk the Moon	What If Nothing	Producer
"All I Want"	2017	Walk the Moon	What If Nothing	Producer
"All Night"	2017	Walk the Moon	What If Nothing	Producer
"Kamikaze"	2017	Walk the Moon	What If Nothing	Producer
"Tiger Teeth"	2017	Walk the Moon	What If Nothing	Producer
"Sound of Awakening"	2017	Walk the Moon	What If Nothing	Producer
"Feels Good to Be High"	2017	Walk the Moon	What If Nothing	Producer
"Can't Sleep (Wolves)"	2017	Walk the Moon	What If Nothing	Producer
"In My Mind"	2017	Walk the Moon	What If Nothing	Producer
"Lost in the Wild"	2017	Walk the Moon	What If Nothing	Producer
"Acoustic"	2018	Billy Raffoul	1975 EP	Producer
"Bite"	2018	Fickle Friends	You Are Someone Else	Co-writer; producer
"Say No More"	2018	Fickle Friends	You Are Someone Else	Producer
"In My Head (Ditty)"	2018	Fickle Friends	You Are Someone Else	Co-writer; producer
"Rotation"	2018	Fickle Friends	You Are Someone Else	Co-writer; producer
"Paris"	2018	Fickle Friends	You Are Someone Else	Producer
"Midnight"	2018	Fickle Friends	You Are Someone Else	Producer
"Useless"	2018	Fickle Friends	You Are Someone Else	Co-writer; producer
"Could You Be Mine?"	2018	Billy Raffoul	1975 EP	Producer
"Errors"	2018	K.I.D	Tired All the Time	Co-writer; producer
"Taker"	2018	K.I.D	Tired All the Time	Co-writer; producer
"Prodigal Daughter"	2018	K.I.D	Tired All the Time	Co-writer; producer
"I Cannot Sleep at Night"	2018	K.I.D	Tired All the Time	Co-writer; producer
"Antisocial"	2018	K.I.D	Tired All the Time	Co-writer; producer
"Drunk Enough to Love Me"	2018	K.I.D	Tired All the Time	Co-writer; producer
"Waiting Room"	2018	K.I.D	Tired All the Time	Co-writer; producer
"Dillon"	2018	K.I.D	Tired All the Time	Co-writer; producer
"Crystal Universe"	2018	K.I.D	Tired All the Time	Co-writer; producer
"Imagining"	2018	K.I.D	Tired All the Time	Co-writer; producer
"Too High to Try/Raintree Lane"	2018	K.I.D	Tired All the Time	Co-writer; producer
"I'm Not a Saint"	2018	Billy Raffoul	1975 EP	Producer
"Forever"	2018	Billy Raffoul	1975 EP	Producer
"Until the Hurting is Gone"	2018	Billy Raffoul	1975 EP	Producer
"1975"	2018	Billy Raffoul	1975 EP	Producer
"Thru These Tears"	2018	LANY	Malibu Nights	Producer
"I Don't Wanna Love You Anymore"	2018	LANY	Malibu Nights	Producer
"Thick and Thin"	2018	LANY	Malibu Nights	Producer
"Taking Me Back"	2018	LANY	Malibu Nights	Producer
"If You See Her"	2018	LANY	Malibu Nights	Producer
"Let Me Know"	2018	LANY	Malibu Nights	Producer
"Run"	2018	LANY	Malibu Nights	Producer
"Valentine's Day"	2018	LANY	Malibu Nights	Producer
"Malibu Nights"	2018	LANY	Malibu Nights	Producer
"OK OK?"	2019	Half Alive	Now, Not Yet	Producer
"Runaway"	2019	Half Alive	Now, Not Yet	Producer
"Maybe"	2019	Half Alive	Now, Not Yet	Producer
"Trust"	2019	Half Alive	Now, Not Yet	Producer
"Way Down We Go"	2019	KALEO	A/B	Producer/Mixer
"Number One Fan"	2019	MUNA	Saves the World	Producer/Mixer
"who"	2019	MUNA	Saves the World	Producer/Mixer
"Navy Blue"	2019	MUNA	Saves the World	Producer/Mixer
"Never"	2019	MUNA	Saves the World	Producer/Mixer
"Pinklight"	2019	MUNA	Saves the World	Producer/Mixer
"Hands Off"	2019	MUNA	Saves the World	Producer/Mixer
"Good News"	2019	MUNA	Saves the World	Producer/Mixer
"Die a Little"	2019	Yungblud		Producer/Mixer
"Original Me (feat Dan Reynolds of Imagine Dragons"	2019	Imagine Dragons		Producer/Mixer
"Tongue Tired"	2019	MARSHMELLO, BLACKBEAR, YUNGBLUD		Writer
"mars"	2020	Yungblud	weird!	Producer/Mixer
"lemonade"	2020	Yungblud	weird!	Producer/Mixer
"Mean It"	2020	Lauv	How I'm Feeling	Producer
Album	2020	The 1975	Notes on a Conditional Form	Mixer
Album	2020	Nothing But Thieves	Moral Panic	Producer/Mixer
EP	2020	Beabadoobee	Loveworm EP	Mixer
"Dying Breed"	2020	The Killers	Imploding the Mirage	Writer
Album	2021	LANY	Mama's Boy	Mixer
"Sex and Cigarettes"	2021	Jeremy Zucker	Crusher	Producer
EP	2021	Jake Wesley Rodgers	Pluto	Producer / Mixer
"Paid For"	2021	Alison Ponthier	Faking My Own Death	Producer
"Harshest Critic"	2021	Alison Ponthier	Faking My Own Death	Producer
Heights	2021	Walk the Moon	HEIGHTS	Producer
Can You Handle My Love	2021	Walk the Moon	HEIGHTS	Producer
Giants	2021	Walk the Moon	HEIGHTS	Producer
DNA	2021	Walk the Moon	HEIGHTS	Producer
Someone Else's Game	2021	Walk the Moon	HEIGHTS	Producer
What You Can't Look Up	2021	Walk the Moon	HEIGHTS	Producer
Population of Two	2021	Walk the Moon	HEIGHTS	Producer
Album	2022	The Wombats	Fix Yourself Not the World	Mixer
Album	2022	Bad Suns	Apocalypse Whenever	Mixer
Album	2022	Yungblud	"Yungblud"	Mixer (1, 7, 11, 12, 15), engineering (1)
Album	2022	Lauv	All 4 Nothing	Mixer
Album	2022	Noah Cyrus	The Hardest Part	Producer / Writer / Mixer
Album	2023	Chelsea Cutler	TBC	Mixer
Album	2023	LANY	A Beautiful Blur	Producer / Writer / Mixer
Album		Nothing But Thieves	Dead Club City	Mixer

== See also ==
- All the Way Back to Liverpool
