= The Sound (The 1975 song) =

Single by The 1975

from the album I Like It When You Sleep, for You Are So Beautiful yet So Unaware of It
- Released: 19 February 2016
- Genre: House; pop; disco
- Length: 4:08 (album version); 3:47 (radio edit)
- Label: Dirty Hit; Polydor Records
- Songwriters: Matthew Healy; George Daniel; Adam Hann; Ross MacDonald
- Producers: Matthew Healy; George Daniel; Mike Crossey

The 1975 singles chronology
"Somebody Else" (2015)	"The Sound" (2016)	"A Change of Heart" (2016)

Music video
- "The Sound" on YouTube

"The Sound" is a song by English band The 1975 from their second studio album, I Like It When You Sleep, for You Are So Beautiful yet So Unaware of It (2016). It was written by band members Matty Healy, George Daniel, Adam Hann, and Ross MacDonald. Mike Crossey handled the production alongside Daniel and Healy. The London Community Gospel Choir provide the song's choir vocals. The song was released on 19 February 2016 by Dirty Hit and Polydor Records as the fourth single from the album. Inspired by the pop albums of his youth, Healy sought to channel the memorable melodies from them and create an "unabashed" pop song. Healy first presented the song to One Direction, who declined, so the band decided to record it.

A house, pop, disco and indie pop song, "The Sound" contains a maximalist four on the floor production inspired by music of the 1980s. It features a disco house piano, syncopated synthesisers, synthesised strings and an electric guitar solo, and incorporates aspects of new wave, funk, and R&B, among other genres. Focusing on a desire for attention, sex, and intellectual validation, the lyrics detail a relationship struggling with deceit. Throughout the song, Healy describes an obsession with the sound of his lover's heartbeat. Upon release, the song was met with widespread acclaim from contemporary music critics, many of whom deemed it a standout from I Like It When You Sleep, for You Are So Beautiful yet So Unaware of It. Specific praise was given to the production, lyrics and The 1975's embrace of pop music, drawing comparisons to M83, Daft Punk, MGMT, and Passion Pit.

"The Sound" appeared on numerous year-end and decade-end lists, including NME, Pitchfork and Time. Commercially, the song peaked at number 15 on the UK Singles Chart, becoming the band's highest-charting release on the chart at the time. Elsewhere, it peaked at number nine on the US Billboard Hot Rock & Alternative Songs and in Scotland. "The Sound" reached the top 50 in Ireland and Japan. The song was later certified double platinum in the United Kingdom by the British Phonographic Industry (BPI). An accompanying music video, directed by Tim Mattia, was released on 26 February 2016. The visual features the band performing inside of a neon-lit glass cube surrounded by strangers, while criticisms of the band are interspersed on pink screens.

== Background and development ==
On 14 January 2016, "The Sound" was officially released as the third single from the band's second album I Like It When You Sleep for You Are So Beautiful yet So Unaware of It, which debuted in February 2016.

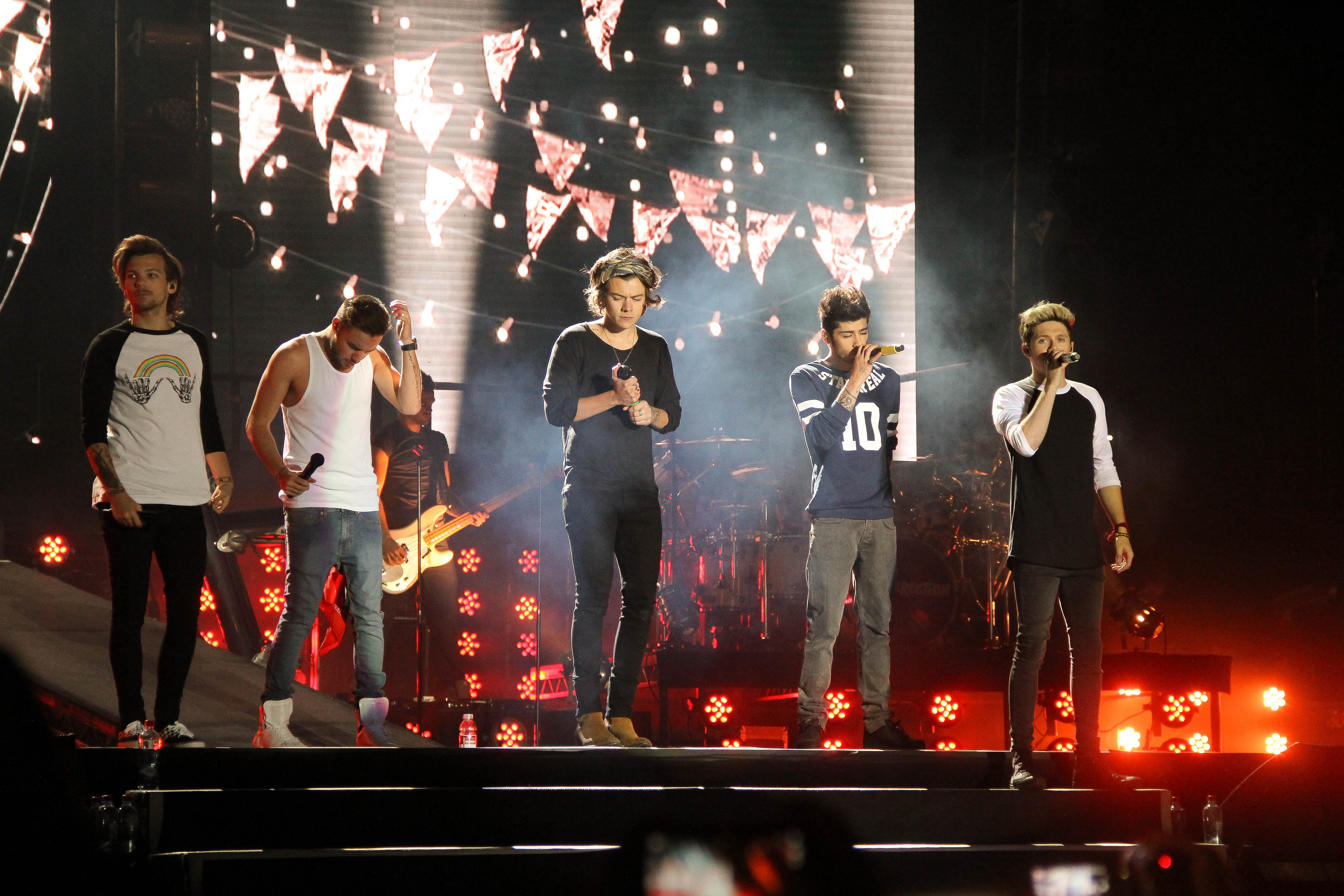
"The Sound" was presented to One Direction during a writing session with Healy.

Rumours of a collaboration between Healy and One Direction surfaced in 2014. The singer later confirmed the veracity of the rumour during an interview with Q, revealing that he entered the studio with the band. One Direction—fans of The 1975's album—invited Healy to a writing session while they were in London. Healy entered the studio with the band for several hours but was unsure of what to present them. He decided to show them one of The 1975's "poppier demos", choosing "The Sound". The members of One Direction were ambivalent toward the demo and wanted to emulate the band's other material instead. Regarding the experience, Healy said: "I thought I'd see how it all works but it just didn't really work very well. It didn't resonate so I thought I'd stick to my own thing."

During the premiere of "The Sound" on Annie Mac's self-titled BBC Radio 1 show, Healy noted it was inspired by "pop music earworms, that kind of ear candy" that he listened to as a child. The singer said that he naturally channelled influences of "big pop records" into the song, specifically their memorable and catchy melodies. Regarding the single's inclusion on I Like It When You Sleep, for You Are So Beautiful yet So Unaware of It, he felt its confident and "poppy" sound juxtaposes it from the album's other songs, telling Mac: "['The Sound'] wears its pop on its sleeve and it's kind of unabashed." In an interview with NME, Healy revealed that "The Sound" is the oldest track on the album, having developed the bridge and the chorus during the writing sessions for The 1975. Regarding the reasoning behind its exclusion from their first album, he said the band lacked the confidence to include it.

== Music and lyrics ==
"The Sound"
A 22-second sample of "The Sound", showcasing the song's four on the floor production, Disco House piano, synthesised strings and stabbing synths.

Musically, "The Sound" is a house, pop, disco and indie pop song. According to the sheet music published at Musicnotes.com by Hal Leonard Music Publishing, "The Sound" is set in the time signature of common time with a moderate tempo of 120 beats per minute. The track is composed in the key of C major, with Healy's vocals ranging between the notes of G_{3} and A_{4}. It follows a chord progression of F–Em–G–Am–Dm. "The Sound" has a maximalist 1980s-style four on the floor production, which consists of an up-tempo rhythm, declarative chord pulses, a Disco House piano, an upbeat and repetitive piano melody, syncopated keys and synthesisers, church-like stabbing synths, synth pulses, jittery funk guitars, synthesised strings, a muted electric guitar and an electric guitar solo in the final post-chorus. The song uses a vocal-warping technique that Brennan Carley of Spin compared to the work of M83, while the London Community Gospel Choir provides a vocal harmony and a choir of voices. The track also contains aspects of dance-pop, electropop, 1980s new wave, funk, R&B, pop-gospel, disco house and synth-pop.

Lyrically, "The Sound" describes a relationship that struggles with deceit and is written in a conversational style, while Healy delivers the lyrics in a sulking tone, according to Ailbhe Malone of The Irish Times. The single opens with the chorus as Healy sings: "Well I know when you're around / 'Cause I know the sound / I know the sound / Of your heart". The upbeat chorus is contrasted by verses filled with gibes and deceit: "You're so conceited that I say that I love you / What does it matter if I lie to you?" He refuses to entertain the fear of rejection and displays self-awareness in the couplet: "It's not about reciprocation, it's just all about me / A sycophantic, prophetic, Socratic junkie wannabe." The track contains sexual undertones presented as innuendos, such as the singer asking a woman to have an orgasm a second time: "Oh, baby, won't you come again?" Healy also derides his partner for calling him out of boredom while she masturbates, despite having ended their relationship to preserve his mental health. Throughout the song, Healy details an addiction-like obsession with the sound of his lover's heartbeat. The singer has memorised its cadence, contractions and expansions, and is now unable to live without it. Healy sings about knowing her heartbeat so intimately that he can hear it even when she is not around. The singer focuses on his desire for attention, sex, intellectual validation, intimacy and immortality, and is eager to both promote himself and air his insecurities.

Thomas Green of The Arts Desk described "The Sound" as a house song composed in a "Bryan Adams-with-Chicane-style", while Pryor Stroud of PopMatters said the single contains "just one, continuous eruption of pure-pop kinetic energy". Euphoria Magazine editor Erin Hampton called the track a "party anthem" and said it connects the 1980s-influenced pop of the previous singles from I Like It When You Sleep, for You Are So Beautiful yet So Unaware of It together. Natalie Harmsen of Atwood Magazine deemed "The Sound" the album's most upbeat and "explosive" song, noting it drastically contrasts the rest of the record. NME writer Rhian Daly also said the track is one of the album's most upbeat songs, both musically and lyrically, while comparing it to Stardust's "Music Sounds Better with You" (1998). Chris DeVille of Stereogum noted similarities between "The Sound" and the works of Justice, Daft Punk, MGMT and Passion Pit. Renowned for Sound editor Jessica Thomas said the single continues to distance The 1975 from their "darker self-titled days", a sentiment shared by Malone, who noted the track takes a "left turn from indie". In contrast, Alison Boghosian of The Daily Orange felt "The Sound" is reminiscent of their debut album. Pitchfork writer Laura Snapes said the song's melody is evocative of the band's "She Way Out" (2013). Kitty Empire of The Guardian described the track as a "withering look at a relationship". Greer Clemens of MTV News said "The Sound" can be read on two tiers; casual listeners may hear the hook and groove, while deeper listeners would hear self-aware irony and subtle, constant self-criticising. Annie Zaleski of The A.V. Club said the release exemplifies the mix of self-awareness and ambivalence present on the album, noting it "describes a totally self-absorbed guy who is yet alert enough to notice his crush".

== Critical reception ==
Upon release, "The Sound" was met with widespread acclaim from contemporary music critics and later appeared on several year-end and decade-end lists. In NME's list of The 1975's best songs, "The Sound" was ranked at number two; Tom Smith said it has become "a knowing celebration of a band who stayed true to what they're good at – penning radio belters and having a laugh while doing so", while praising the playful attitude and "shimmering" production. Collin Brennan of Consequence of Sound deemed the release a standout from I Like It When You Sleep, for You Are So Beautiful yet So Unaware of It. Calling the track an album highlight, Jamieson Cox of The Verge praised the amount of hooks and labelled it an "irresistible bit of thumping house". Matt Collar of AllMusic declared "The Sound" an album highlight and flatter the "brightly infectious" hooks, noting it is similar to the work of Prince. Malone designated the song as her Track of the Week, commending the "transcendental [and] climaxing" chorus and calling it "fizzy, giddy and joyful and exactly what we need this grim January week". Amy McCann of Variance deemed the track the album's best pre-release single, calling it "irresistible".

Hampton praised the production of "The Sound" and its embrace of pop music, while calling it "fresh, body moving and beautifully produced". Sean Adams of Drowned in Sound commended the song's "anthemic magic" and Matthew Strauss of Pitchfork said: "It's fun and clever and anthemic while taking the piss out of big anthems at the same time." Thomas lauded the track's "infectious" beat, saying it is "undeniably one darn catchy pop tune crafted with the signature [t]he 1975 flair". Tom Connick of DIY commended the 1990s-style production of "The Sound", self-referential lyrics and embrace of pop music, calling it "an unashamed throwback to the massive pop of days gone by, relishing in the glitz and glamour that the charts are so sadly devoid of". Alex Ross of The Fader called the single a "soaring, danceable anthemic track", commending the lyrical reflection and sense of escapism, while highlighting its blend of 1980s synths, 1970s rock and late 1990s style. Harmsen said the track "seamlessly" combines aspects of 1990s and modern pop, while praising its "ease and happiness". Rolling Stone editors Jon Dolan, Brittany Spanos and Christopher Weingarten lauded the "neon-bright enthusiasm" and "tenderly catchy refrain" of "The Sound", saying the guitar solo and synths reference 1980s new wave without "getting too lost in nostalgia".

Jonathan Wroble of Slant Magazine called "The Sound" an "ultraclean early Prince sendup" and Kika Chatterjee of Alternative Press compared it to Rick Astley "in a way that is, somehow, positive". Carley said the song demonstrates "exactly how modern pop-rock groups should be doing things" while noting it "bodes well for the future of a very, very promising new album". Carl Williott of Idolator said the track's release made it "immediately apparent that this British foursome didn't deserve to be lumped in with those other purveyors of optimized pap". Lucas Fagen of Hyperallergic felt "The Sound" revives the album from a mid-album lull, saying it "would dominate the radio all summer if funk-lite still got airplay". Stroud said the single's energy never appears to be out of control, writing it is "curated [and] fine-tuned to express an overwhelming infatuation without becoming overwhelmed by this infatuation itself". Daly lauded the "piercing" synth stab, "glorious [disses]" and Hann's "triumphantly scorching" guitar solo. Clemens highlighted the chorus and deemed it "one of [t]he 1975's catchiest lyrics", but also noted that some listeners may find the track's lyrics to be sexist, clichéd or "borderline sociopathic". Exclaim! editor Ian Gormely highlighted the "soaring" chorus', while Andy Baber of musicOMH called it "irresistible".

=== Accolades ===
Critical rankings for "The Sound"
Critic/Organization	Time span	Rank	Published year
Ben Beaumont-Thomas (The Guardian)	Year-end	*	2016
Entertainment Weekly	Mid-year	19	2016
NME	Year-end	12	2016
Pitchfork	Decade-end	178	2019
Popjustice	Year-end	38	2016
PopMatters	Year-end	4	2016
Rolling Stone	Mid-year	1	2016
Red Bull	Year-end	25	2016
Spin	Year-end	19	2016
Tampa Bay Times	Year-end	2	2016
Time	Year-end	2	2016

== Commercial performance ==
In the United Kingdom, "The Sound" peaked at number 15 on the UK Singles Chart before later being ranked at number 91 on the chart's year-end edition, becoming the band's most commercially successful release at the time. Additionally, the song reached number 11 in Scotland. The track was later certified double platinum by the British Phonographic Industry (BPI), denoting over 1,200,000 certified units in the UK. Elsewhere in Europe, "The Sound" peaked at number 25 in Ireland, number 28 on the Belgium Ultratip Flanders chart and number 84 in Finland.

In the United States, "The Sound" reached number nine on the US Billboard Hot Rock & Alternative Songs and was later ranked at number 26 on the chart's year-end edition. Also in the US, the single peaked at number three on the Billboard Bubbling Under Hot 100 Singles chart, number 24 on the Billboard Adult Top 40 chart, number 32 on the Billboard Digital Song Sales chart and number 34 on the Billboard Mainstream Top 40 chart. Elsewhere in North America, the track reached number 91 on the Billboard Canadian Hot 100. In South America, "The Sound" peaked at number 10 on the Argentina Airplay chart. In the Asia-Pacific region, "The Sound" peaked at number 53 in Australia and number six on the New Zealand Heatseekers chart. The track was later certified gold by the Australian Recording Industry Association (ARIA), denoting over 35,000 certified units in Australia. In Japan, the song reached number 42 on the Billboard Japan Hot 100.

== Music video ==
An accompanying music video, directed by Tim Mattia, was released on 25 February 2016. The video begins with The 1975 performing "The Sound" inside transparent pink neon-lit box, which the band use for their live performances. During their performance, strangers dressed in sterile white outfits slowly begin gathering to observe and get a closer look at the band. As the observing crowd begin talking to one another, words flash up on pink screens, representing critiques levelled at the band. The phrases include insults such as: "Terrible high-pitched vocals", "Punch-your-TV obnoxious", "Unconvincing emo lyrics", "Is this a joke?" and "Do people really still make music like this?", among others. Other derogatory remarks about their debut album continue to be interspersed throughout the visual. The box begins to fog up and The 1975 appear apprehensive about their situation, with Healy writing "Help Me" on one of the walls. However, the band is suddenly transported away, and are able to watch the previously critical audience trapped inside the box.

Lindsey Sullivan of Billboard viewed the video as a rebuttal of The 1975's critics, saying the "Manchester men are just as candid as they are catchy". Larry Bartleet of NME called the visual "critic-trolling", while highlighting its "we don't give a shit" message and saying "you should probably get over yourself right now ... because no one cares. The 1975, especially, could really not care less". Althea Legaspi of Rolling Stone praised the video's humour, noting it "finds [the band] taking on their critics in a humorous way". Williot called the visual clever. Emmy Mack of Music Feeds praised The 1975's "savvy hyper-awareness" and humour, deeming the video "smarter than your average".

== Credits and personnel ==
Credits adapted from I Like It When You Sleep, for You Are So Beautiful yet So Unaware of It album liner notes.

- Matthew Healy – composer, producer, electric guitar, keyboards, vocals, background vocals
- George Daniel – composer, producer, programming, synthesiser programming, drums, keyboards, synthesiser, percussion
- Adam Hann – composer, electric guitar
- Ross MacDonald – composer
- London Community Gospel Choir – choir vocals
- Jamie Squire – synthesiser
- Mike Crossey – producer, programming, mixer
- Jonathan Gilmore – recording engineer, programming
- Chris Gehringer – mastering engineer

== Charts ==
=== Weekly charts ===
Chart performance for "The Sound"
Chart (2016)	Peak position
Argentina Airplay (Monitor Latino)	10
Australia (ARIA)	53
Belgium (Ultratip Bubbling Under Flanders)	28
Finland (Suomen virallinen lista)	84
Canada Hot 100 (Billboard)	91
Ireland (IRMA)	25
Japan Hot 100 (Billboard)	42
New Zealand Heatseekers (Recorded Music NZ)	6
Scottish Singles Sales (Official Charts)	11
Switzerland Airplay (Schweizer Hitparade)	92
UK Singles (Official Charts)	15
US Bubbling Under Hot 100 (Billboard)	3
US Digital Song Sales (Billboard)	32
US Hot Rock & Alternative Songs (Billboard)	9
US Adult Pop Airplay (Billboard)	24
US Pop Airplay (Billboard)	34
US Rock & Alternative Airplay (Billboard)	25

=== Year-end charts ===
2016 year-end chart performance for "The Sound"
Chart (2016)	Position
UK Singles (Official Charts Company)	91
US Hot Rock & Alternative Songs (Billboard)	26

== Certifications ==
Certifications and sales for "The Sound"
Region	Certification	Certified units/sales
Australia (ARIA)	Gold	35,000^{‡}
United Kingdom (BPI)	2× Platinum	1,200,000^{‡}
United States (RIAA)	Platinum	1,000,000^{‡}
^{‡} Sales+streaming figures based on certification alone.

== See also ==
- The 1975 discography
- List of songs by Matty Healy
