= All the Way Back to Liverpool =

2012 film

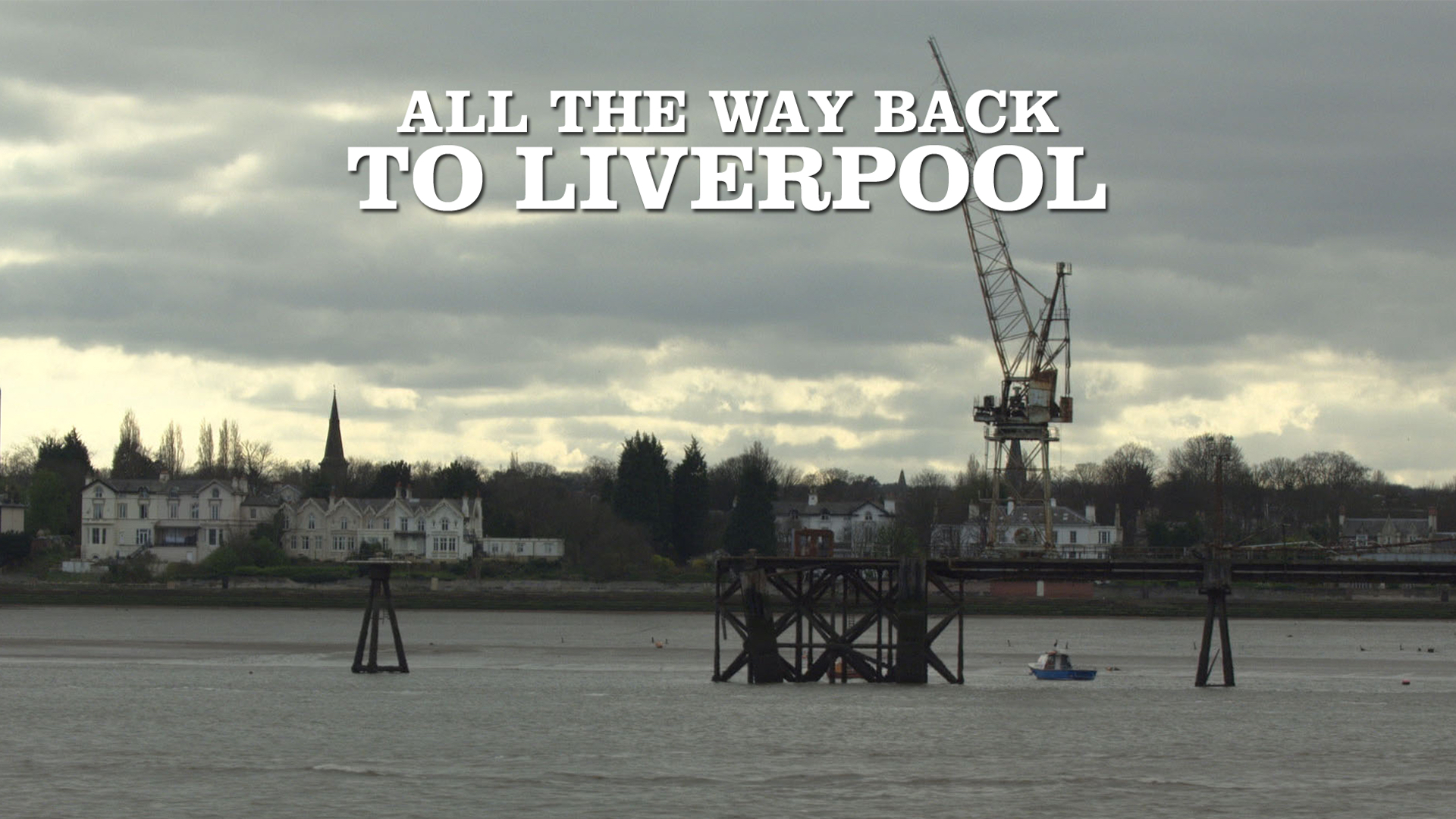
- Theatrical release poster
- Directed by: Chandra Fleig
- Produced by: Chandra Fleig
- Starring: Mike Crossey; Paul Crowe; Lucy Styles; Ian McMillan
- Cinematography: Thomas Bergmann
- Edited by: Conny Albrecht
- Music by: Paul Crowe; Lucy Styles; Ian McMillan; Mike Crossey; Chandra Fleig
- Release date: 1 July 2012 (Germany)
- Running time: 73 minutes
- Countries: Germany; United Kingdom
- Language: English

All the Way Back to Liverpool is a 2012 German–British documentary film directed by Chandra Fleig which has been released as a music webisode in 2014.

It features the work of award-winning music producer Mike Crossey, singer-songwriter Lucy Styles, Paul Crowe and Ian McMillan both former members of the band The Aeroplanes.

The documentary shows a group of musicians and friends as they write, rehearse and record new material and shows the creative process of music production and songwriting from the initial idea to the final product.

The film was made by German filmmaker and musician Chandra Fleig, who lived in Liverpool at the end of the 1990s and studied at the Liverpool Institute for Performing Arts.

== Musicians ==
- Paul Crowe (guitars, vocals)
- Lucy Styles (keyboards, guitars, transverse flute, vocals)
- Ian McMillan (vocals, drums)
- Mike Crossey (bass)
- Chandra Fleig (vocals, guitars)

== Production ==
All nine episodes of the documentary were filmed in ten days in Liverpool, including three days in the Motor Museum (previously called "the Pink Museum"). The project has been supported by Film University Babelsberg Konrad Wolf.

== Soundtrack ==
A soundtrack has also been released as a digital release in 2014, containing two songs "Wipe You From My List" and "My Old Friend Doubt" which were recorded in the Motor Museum.
