= Ugh! (song) =

Single by The 1975

from the album I Like It When You Sleep, for You Are So Beautiful yet So Unaware of It
- Released: 10 December 2015
- Genre: Funk; new wave; R&B
- Length: 3:00
- Label: Dirty Hit; Polydor Records
- Songwriters: Matthew Healy; George Daniel; Adam Hann; Ross MacDonald
- Producers: Matthew Healy; George Daniel; Adam Hann; Ross MacDonald; Mike Crossey

The 1975 singles chronology
"Love Me" (2015)	"Ugh!" (2015)	"Somebody Else" (2016)

Music video
- "Ugh!" on YouTube

"Ugh!" (stylized in all caps) is a song by English band The 1975 from their second studio album, I Like It When You Sleep, for You Are So Beautiful yet So Unaware of It (2016). The song was written by Matty Healy, George Daniel, Adam Hann and Ross MacDonald. Mike Crossey handled the production alongside Daniel and Healy. The song was released on 10 December 2015 by Dirty Hit and Polydor Records as the second single from the album. The band's obsession with syncopation and rhythm drove the song's creation, while Healy explained the lyrics are about coming down from cocaine, drug-fuelled conversations and social interactions.

"Ugh!" is a stripped-down funk, R&B and synth-pop ballad containing disco, art pop, jazz, electro-funk, and new wave elements. The song's tropical production consists of a synthetic funk groove, an electro-indie rhythm and a 1970s-style funk beat. The song is about Healy's cocaine addiction, narrating a struggle between attempting to quit and the desire to continue. Themes explored on the song include sexual frustration, self-obsession and self-disgust, among others.

Upon release, "Ugh!" received generally positive reviews from contemporary music critics, who praised the song's sonic innovation, production, lyrics and Healy's vocals. Commercially, it reached number 42 on the UK Singles Chart, number 26 in Scotland, number 80 in Ireland and number 10 on the US Billboard Hot Rock & Alternative Songs chart. The song was later certified silver in the United Kingdom by the British Phonographic Industry (BPI). An accompanying music video, directed by Adam Powell, was released on 18 December 2015. The visual features The 1975 performing the song on a neon-lit stage.

== Background and development ==
"I'm not lying: I'm from a white upper-middle-class background from Cheshire, and I've been in a band that's been involved in everything from, like, big festivals to fashion over the past three years ... The social group around me involves cocaine. It does."

— Healy, on his relationship with cocaine.

Healy described the songwriting process of "Ugh!" as "something that goes back to the early foundation of how we write music as [t]he 1975", saying it was driven by The 1975's obsession with syncopation and rhythm. Regarding the title, the singer said it is meant to represent a sense of dissatisfaction and regret for oneself. Healy told Patrick Doyle of Rolling Stone that "Ugh!" is about coming down from cocaine, saying he felt comfortable discussing his past with cocaine due to the understanding nature of the band's fanbase. In an interview with Michael Hann of The Observer, Healy spoke about a conflict between his desire to be honest and the responsibility he has towards younger fans, saying: "I can't start talking to kids about drugs." He was questioned about this by Hann, who noted that "Ugh!" reflects upon the singer's relationship with cocaine. In response, Healy said that despite being a former addict, his attitude towards cocaine has since become nonchalant: "It's part of the social fabric. It's part of going out. I don't have a problem with cocaine any more." Speaking with Shahlin Graves of Coup de Main, he said the song takes inspiration from drug-fuelled conversation and social interactions, observing a tendency for individuals to focus on themselves instead of involving others. Following its premiere on Zane Lowe's Beats 1 show on 10 December 2015, "Ugh!" was officially released as the album's second single, accompanied by a typewritten note and three drawings related to the song.

== Music and lyrics ==
"Ugh!"
An 18-second sample of "Ugh!", showcasing the song's chorus. It features the song's 1970s-style funk beat, glossy synth-bass and skronky space-age synths.

Musically, "Ugh!" is a stripped-down funk, R&B and synth-pop ballad, which has a length of three minutes (3:00). A "carbonated" synthetic funk groove provides the song's foundation, which incorporates an upbeat tempo, tight hooks, an off-beat melody, an off-kilter electro-indie rhythm and a 1970s-style funk beat. The song's tropical production contains a glossy synth-bass, skronky space-age synths, spare handclaps, a finger-picked guitar, bright and supple guitar lines and a loose rhythm section. The track also incorporates elements from disco, art pop, jazz, electro-funk, and new wave.

"Ugh!" explores themes of romantic and sexual frustrations, as well as self-obsession and self-disgust. It is about Healy's cocaine addiction and discusses both his comedown from the drug and his unsuccessful attempts to rid himself of the addiction. The song acts as a commentary on oneself and modern culture, narrating a struggle between the desire to continue something while also trying to give it up. The singer reveals that despite efforts to differentiate himself, he cannot escape an era of lost, self-absorbed youth seeking acceptance and money, realising that while a life outside of fame and drugs was better, he cannot give his lifestyle up. Healy sings about the shallow nature of modern fame, including overrated parties, cheap make-up and temporary highs, while also making references to an irregular heartbeat, numb gums and asking for a card. In the chorus, he passionately sings "And you're the only thing that's going on in my mind / Taking over my life a second time / I don't have the capacity for fucking / You're meant to be helping me" with a strain in his voice.

Tom Connick of DIY called "Ugh!" a "wavering take on [t]he 1975's funkier pop tendencies" and compared Healy's vocal delivery to Justin Timberlake. Chris DeVille of Stereogum felt the song is similar to the works of Phil Collins, noting it mines funky 1980s art pop elements reminiscent of INXS, Peter Gabriel and Scritti Politti. Mikael Wood of the Los Angeles Times also observed influences of INXS. Larry Fitzmaurice of Vice said the song "imagines how Scritti Politti would sound if Vampire Weekend was Green Gartside's backing band". Jamieson Cox of The Verge said its "sprightly density" draws from Scritti Politti and Prefab Sprout, while Andrew Unterberger of Spin echoed the comparisons to the former. Carolyn Menyes of Music Times interpreted a darker undertone within the lyrics. Similarly, Rhian Daly of NME noted that while the dark subject matter could make the song dreary and self-indulgent, its "joyous" sound "virtually [encourages] finger-clicking, hip-dipping dad-dancing". Hayden Manders of Nylon compared the song to The 1975's "Menswear" (2013), observing themes of drug use, love and lust, saying it blurs the lines between them to justify Healy's use of cocaine.

== Reception ==
=== Critical response ===
Upon release, "Ugh!" was met with positive reviews from contemporary music critics, while the response from The 1975's fanbase was more favourable than "Love Me". Stereogum declared the former the 28th-best pop song of 2015, with DeVille writing: "I’m already all-in on Healy’s Scritti Politti phase." Dan Weiss of Spin called the song a "convincingly arresting tune", deeming it a marriage of Scritti Politti's Cupid & Psyche 85 (1985) and Usher's My Way (1997). Kika Chatterjee of Alternative Press described the track as a "technicolor anthem", praising the juxtaposition of Healy's sardonicism with the glowy synth. She also noted similarities with "Menswear", deeming it the mature companion. Matt Collar of AllMusic called "Ugh!" delightful while comparing it to "something Madonna might have made in collaboration with Chic guitarist Nile Rodgers and art-pop duo Yello".

Amy Davidson of Digital Spy called "Ugh!" brilliant and an "unravelling of the band's new sound". Erin Hampton of Euphoria Magazine praised the song's innovative sound and desperate lyrics, observing there is a "brave and brilliant new sound". She noted The 1975 presented a clear agenda by releasing the song after "Love Me", saying it mirrors the album's themes. The editorial staff of Radio X said the track builds upon the 1980s sound of "Love Me", commenting that Healy "sings up a storm". Menyes noted "Ugh!" is an improvement over "Love Me", praising the sinister lyrics and production while calling it "the sort of earworm that can't necessarily get out of your head". Daly commended the song's verbose and ostentatious lyrics, calling them "one of the most fascinating facets" of the band. Additionally, he wrote: "[The track] might be more personal than the selfie culture-attacking ‘Love Me’, but it's no less bold, brilliant or thought-provoking."

Jon Dolan of Rolling Stone said "Ugh!" is slickly strutting, praising Healy's vocals while calling him a "disco lizard king". Natalie Weiner of Billboard called the song "groovy" and commended Healy's vocals. Jonathan Wroble of Slant Magazine called the track "impossibly squirmy" and praised the backing groove, calling it an "earworm". Sean Adams of Drowned in Sound commended the song's "glorious clatter". Annie Zaleski of The A.V. Club felt "Ugh!" is an "obvious single", describing it as a "beachy ode to the lure of cocaine". Manders praised The 1975 for finding a silver lining in the song's dark themes, noting they successfully move the song away from being morose, while writing that it perfectly captures the sick amusement in complacency. Alex Green of Clash said the song covers familiar ground, calling it bland. Andy Gill of The Independent said the track is less appealing than "Love Me", writing that it "[mistakes] mere riff for melody, and lyrical tricksiness for sophistication".

=== Commercial performance ===
In The 1975's native United Kingdom, "Ugh!" peaked at number 42 on the UK Singles Chart and number 26 in Scotland. The song was later certified silver by the British Phonographic Industry (BPI), denoting sales of over 200,000 units in the UK. Elsewhere in Europe, it reached number 80 in Ireland. In the United States, "Ugh!" peaked at number 12 on the US Billboard Hot Rock & Alternative Songs chart, before later being ranked at number 98 on the chart's year-end edition.

== Music video ==
An accompanying music video, directed by Adam Powell, was released on 18 December 2015. The visual, which was shot entirely on film, is based on The 1975's live shows. It features projection-mapping over a Kraftwerk-style set, with the band performing the song on a series of platforms surrounded by pillars and fuzzy screens. The set lights up in a variety of hues, including fluorescent lights, bright neon lights and the muted, soft colour theme introduced in "Love Me". As The 1975 perform, Healy dances in various outfits and oftentimes appears on screen without a shirt. Chandra Johnson of MTV News gave the visual a positive review, comparing Healy's "cheeky dance moves" to Drake's in "Hotline Bling" (2015). Graves also drew comparisons to "Hotline Bling" while noting it continues to perpetuate the band's recently introduced retro, vibrantly coloured aesthetic. Menyes commended The 1975 for being "as energetic as ever", calling the video "fiery". Brittany Spanos of Rolling Stone described the video as sleek and futuristic, writing that it showcases a stark shift from the black-and-white aesthetic present on the visuals of The 1975.

== Credits and personnel ==
Credits adapted from I Like It When You Sleep, for You Are So Beautiful yet So Unaware of It album liner notes.

- Matthew Healy – composer, producer, electric guitar, vocals, background vocals
- George Daniel – composer, producer, programming, synthesizer programming, drums, keyboards, synthesizer, percussion
- Adam Hann – composer, electric guitar
- Ross MacDonald – composer
- Mike Crossey – producer, programming, mixer
- Jonathan Gilmore – recording engineer
- Chris Gehringer – mastering engineer

== Charts ==
=== Weekly charts ===
Chart performance for "Ugh!"
Chart (2016)	Peak position
Ireland (IRMA)	80
Scottish Singles Sales (Official Charts)	26
UK Singles (Official Charts)	42
US Hot Rock & Alternative Songs (Billboard)	10

=== Year-end charts ===
2016 year-end chart performance for "Ugh!"
Chart (2016)	Position
US Hot Rock & Alternative Songs (Billboard)	98

== Certifications ==
Certifications and sales for "Ugh!"
Region	Certification	Certified units/sales
United Kingdom (BPI)	Silver	200,000^{‡}
^{‡} Sales+streaming figures based on certification alone.

== See also ==
- The 1975 discography
- List of songs by Matty Healy
