= Love Me (The 1975 song) =

Single by The 1975

from the album I Like It When You Sleep, for You Are So Beautiful yet So Unaware of It
- Released: 8 October 2015
- Genre: Funk; new wave
- Length: 3:42
- Label: Dirty Hit; Polydor Records
- Songwriters: Matthew Healy; George Daniel; Adam Hann; Ross MacDonald
- Producers: Matthew Healy; George Daniel; Mike Crossey

The 1975 singles chronology
"Medicine" (2014)	"Love Me" (2015)	"Ugh!" (2015)

Music video
- "Love Me" on YouTube

"Love Me" is a song by English band The 1975 from their second studio album, I Like It When You Sleep, for You Are So Beautiful yet So Unaware of It (2016). The song was written by Matty Healy, George Daniel, Adam Hann and Ross MacDonald. Mike Crossey handled the production alongside Daniel and Healy. It was released on 8 October 2015 by Dirty Hit and Polydor Records as the lead single from the album. Written two years before its release, the song was inspired by the band's adjustment to their newfound celebrity status, having found themselves in a scene where fame was prized as currency. The track's production was inspired by the music of the 1980s, specifically the work of Trevor Horn, Frankie Goes to Hollywood and Oingo Boingo.

A funk and electropop song, "Love Me" is markedly more pop-sounding than The 1975's trademark ambient and ethereal compositions, incorporating elements of new wave, post-punk, art pop, dance-pop, funk rock and power pop. The production encompasses an intricate mesh of guitars and synthesisers alongside a 1980s-style saxophone, cowbells and a guitar solo. Healy sings in an experimental style, using articulation techniques such as staccato. The lyrics both celebrate and admonish narcissism, ego and fame, acting as a commentary on modern society's obsession with celebrities.

Upon release, "Love Me" received generally positive reviews from contemporary music critics, who compared it to David Bowie and Prince. Reviewers praised the song's unexpected sound, production and Healy's vocals. The track later appeared on several year-end lists. It peaked at number 20 on the UK Singles Chart, number 10 in Scotland and reached the top 50 in Australia, Canada and Ireland. In the United States, the song peaked at number 7 on the US Billboard Hot Rock & Alternative Songs chart and number 100 on the US Billboard Hot 100 chart. It was later certified gold in the United Kingdom by the British Phonographic Industry (BPI). An accompanying music video, directed by Diane Martel, was released on 28 October 2015. The visual features The 1975 performing the song alongside cardboard cutouts of various celebrities, and received positive reviews from contemporary critics.

== Background and release ==
In June 2015, Healy posted a photo of the cover art for I Like It When You Sleep, for You Are So Beautiful yet So Unaware of It and a pink square on Twitter. The singer also released a statement that described The 1975's need to change their identity, both visually and philosophically, while saying: "Firstly we must reclaim our identity & repossess our control of it...Until then there won't be any pop music or dancing with long hair." The band continued teasing an upcoming release in the form of mysterious new images and merchandise. On 29 September, they began a ten-day countdown on their website, leading to 8 October. On 6 October, The 1975 announced that the song would premiere two days later on BBC Radio 1. "Love Me" was officially released as the album's lead single on 8 October. Regarding the decision to release the song as the lead single, Healy said it was because "it's too ridiculous to follow anything really".

== Development ==
"'Love Me' as a song was born [out] of our confusion as to how big we'd gotten, in our eyes. We can't say how big we are, but for us, we surpassed a lot of our expectations [...] We weren't having a dig at anyone or at culture."

— Healy, on what inspired The 1975 to write "Love Me".

In an interview with iHeartRadio, Healy told Nicole Mastrogiannis that "Love Me" is about himself. He said the song represents The 1975 coming to terms with a new life after achieving commercial success with their debut album. The singer described the track as making light of the band's newfound fame while adjusting to the "quite lavish, ridiculous part" of the social fabric they were unfamiliar with. Healy noted that, unlike their friends, The 1975 were not celebrities, but found themselves in a social scene where fame is often prized as "social currency". Regarding the influence of this situation on the songwriting process, the singer said they "wanted to comment on that, and say that it feels a bit weird, and a bit that this culture seems to be unjustified for that". Healy told Joe Lynch of Billboard that he wanted "Love Me" to embrace a narrative of: "The rock star buying into his own self-constructed mythology." The singer wanted the song to sound bombastic, ridiculous and slightly arrogant, representing The 1975 being immersed in a world they did not feel part of. He discovered a social hierarchy based on whom an individual had photos with, which he felt was a "decline in the standards of what we expect culturally".

In an interview with Premier Guitar, Hann revealed "Love Me" was written two years prior to its release. The guitarist told Tzvi Gluckin that typically, Daniel builds the basis of a song on his laptop using Logic Pro, sending Hann a simple guitar idea. The latter expands on the concept or creates something new, engaging in a back-and-forth with the producer. However, the guitarist said "Love Me" was composed in a spontaneous manner, with the initial idea created on tour during a soundcheck. To achieve the desired tone for the song's guitar solo, the band recorded it using a Music Man John Petrucci Signature Series guitar, firing different pieces from the DI unit through different pedals, amps and delays, giving it a "weird" character. Hann also used the guitar to construct the main chord part of "Love Me", since it gave the song a 1980s sound that maintained a "well-balanced even sound to it".

Regarding the production, Healy said The 1975 chose to create "Love Me" in a 1980s-style due to the era being "where our love of pop music is [...] It's where a lot of our favorite records come from. I think where a lot of people's favorite records come from". They were inspired by the innovative production techniques and dramatic nature of 1980s pop music, noting it was crafted in a way that avoided theatrics. The singer highlighted the exploratory production that developed in the era, noting technology became an important production tool as artists tried to see how "ridiculous" they could sound. He cited the film Weird Science (1985), producer Trevor Horn and bands such as Frankie Goes to Hollywood and Oingo Boingo as influences on the song. While trying to emulate the ethos of the era for "Love Me", they did not want to create a pastiche that was overly-referential.

== Music and lyrics ==
"Love Me"
A 22-second sample of "Love Me", showcasing the song's intricate mesh of guitars and synthesisers, 1980s saxophones, cowbells, wibbly synth breaks, and Healy's experimental vocals.

Musically, "Love Me" is a funk and electropop song. It has a length of three minutes and 42 seconds (3:42). According to sheet music published at Musicnotes.com by Hal Leonard Music Publishing, "Love Me" is set in the time signature of common time with a moderate tempo of 98 beats per minute. The track is composed in the key of F major, with Healy's vocals ranging between the notes of F_{3} and B♭_{4}. It follows a chord progression of F7–E7–F7. The production contains an intricate mesh of guitars and synthesisers, chunky 1980s riffs, "huge" shivering hooks, thin and bright rhythm guitars panning between speakers, wibbly synth breaks, a synth solo, cowbells, a 1980s-style saxophone and background vocals which come out of the left and right channels, which Jonathan Wroble of Slant Magazine described as a "chorus of adulation". Hann's guitar solo occurs at 2:26, using reamped tones, tricks and exotic effects. "Love Me" is distinctly different from the band's previous music, eschewing their trademark ethereal and ambient elements in favour of a more 1980s pop sound that incorporates aspects of new wave and post-punk. Additionally, the song contains elements of art pop, dance-pop, funk rock and power pop.

Lyrically, "Love Me" serves to support The 1975's denial of their rock stardom and is both a celebration and an admonishment of narcissism, ego and being famous. The song criticises overinflated egos, admonishing those who are unable to remain connected with reality on the basis of self-absorption. The track acts as a "post-ironic" comment on selfie culture and 21st-century society's vacuous obsession with celebrities. In the first verse, Healy sings: "I'm just with my friends online and there's things we'd like to change". "Love Me" is also an admission of wrongdoing, with the lyrics serving as an apology to the band itself for losing sight of what is most important to them—the music, singing in the pre-chorus: "We've just come to represent a decline in the standards of what we accept!" In the chorus, he sings: "And love me yeah/ If that's what you wanna do". Healy's vocals in the song are approached with a new, experimental methodology, singing from the highest peak of his range to the lowest point. Unlike The 1975's previous songs, the singer eschews a crooning style and adopts "jumping" melodies and musical articulations such as staccato to give the track an emotional depth.

Matt Collar of AllMusic called "Love Me" a "cheeky, plastic" funk song. Wroble said the track mimics Peter Gabriel's "Big Time" (1986) to "masterful effect". Exclaim! editor Ian Gormely compared it to a song that "fell off the back of an INXS greatest hits collection". Kitty Empire of The Guardian said "Love Me" resembles Duran Duran's Notorious (1986). Rolling Stone writer Jon Dolan said the song "funkily" recalls Nile Rodgers' production work with Duran Duran. Pryor Stroud of PopMatters called the track a "post-Random Access Memories update of Duran Duran's chrome-funk work with Nile Rodgers". Collin Brennan of Consequence of Sound compared the song's guitar riff to David Bowie's "Fame" (1975) and the chorus to the Isley Brothers' "It's Your Thing" (1969), writing its plagiarism of the two songs feels "self-conscious and self-effacing". Rhian Daly of NME called "Love Me" a nod to "Fame"-era Bowie. Laura Snapes of Pitchfork said the song splices Bowie's "Fame" and "Fashion" (1980). Kika Chatterjee of Alternative Press called the track "blatantly Bowie-esque, perfectly at home on a disco dance floor".

== Critical reception ==
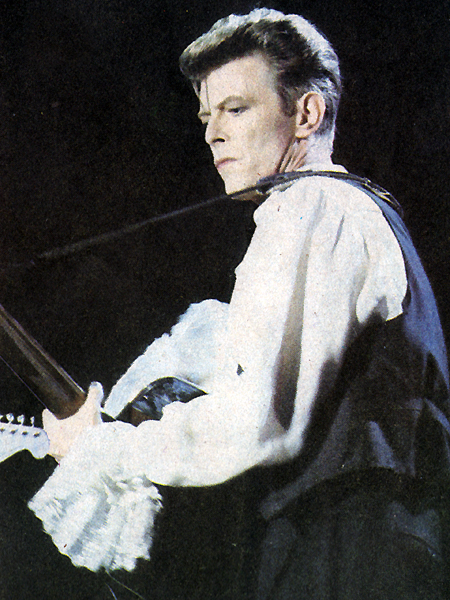
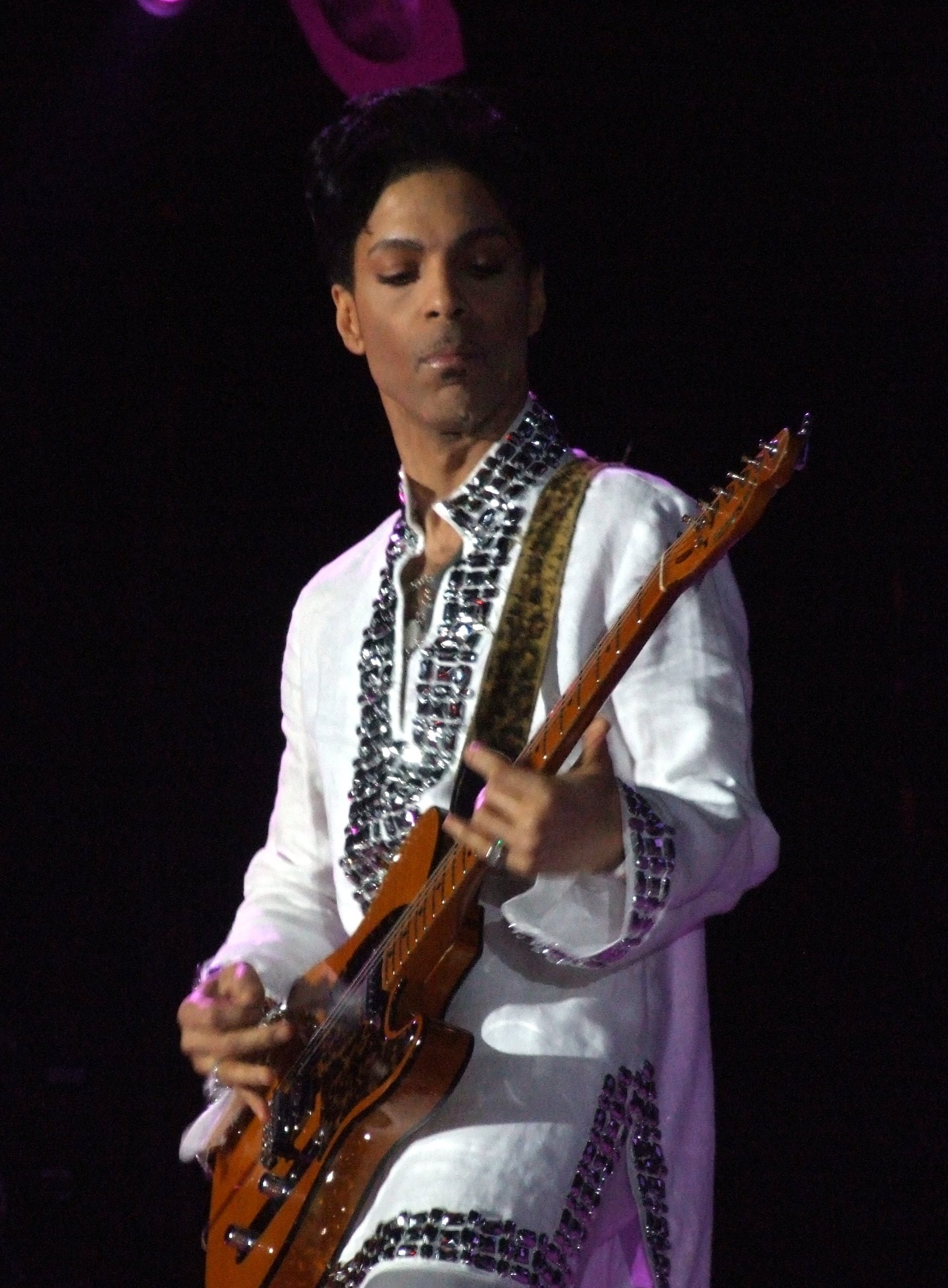
"Love Me" received numerous comparisons to the works of David Bowie (left) and Prince (right).

Stereogum named "Love Me" the 45th-best pop song of 2015, saying The 1975 "lock into a groove so tight you could snap it in half and so funky you can smell it". The track also appeared on Collar's 2015 year-end songs list for AllMusic. NME ranked "Love Me" at number 5 on their year-end list; Emily Barker commended the lyrics, wordplay and themes, while noting the song mines "Fame"-era David Bowie, Talking Heads and INXS.

Andy Gill of The Independent said "Love Me" is The 1975's "gauche take on Talking Heads' preppy funk-pop". In his review of I Like It When You Sleep, for You Are So Beautiful yet So Unaware of It, Collar called the song delightful, while comparing it to "something Madonna might have made in collaboration with Chic guitarist Nile Rodgers and art-pop duo Yello". MTV News writer Chandra Johnson said the track "sounds a lot less Brian Eno and a lot more Prince than their previous work". Laurence Day of The Line of Best Fit compared "Love Me" to Prince and Duran Duran, lauding the production for containing "more pop pleasures than seems humanly possible", ultimately deeming it a "massive" comeback for the band. Matthew Horton of NME called the song a "monster hit" reminiscent of Bowie's "Fame". He also praised its confidence and the "unexpected but brilliant cock-rocking guitar solo". Gigwise editor Andrew Trendell said the track is the most pop-inclined song the band has ever created, describing it as a mixture of the Red Hot Chili Peppers "soaked" in a 1980s vibe that blends Bowie's Let's Dance, the "sexiest" Prince moments, the power pop of Peter Gabriel's "Sledgehammer" (1986) and Bros.

In their review of "Love Me", the editorial staff of DIY called the song "massive" and said it represents a huge statement from the band, praising the "spiky, Prince-aping guitar work and unabashed [1980s] love". Gluckin called the track an education in pop guitar, highlighting Hann's Bowie-esque guitar solo for giving it its "particular muscle". Jordyn Halpern of Euphoria Magazine praised Healy's "genius" vocal experimentation, saying the singer channels Prince, while describing "Love Me" as "the mesh of sheer talent and cockiness that lets us all fall in love with [t]he 1975 in a way we never could before". Billboard editor Nick Williams lauded Healy's newfound embrace of a "rock-star growl", deeming the song an impressive coming-of-age change that deviates from the teen-rock of the band's prior catalogue. Similarly, Sam Murphy of Music Feeds noted the track shifted The 1975's sound toward pop music, while praising the funky guitars and a 1980s-influenced beat, deeming it an "ear worm".

Gormely deemed "Love Me" one of the two pillars from I Like It When You Sleep, for You Are So Beautiful yet So Unaware of It, calling it "insanely infectious". Sean Adams of Drowned in Sound said the song contains "anthemic magic". Chatterjee felt the track is a "shock to the system from a band that can be famously solemn", while highlighting its "fun" nature. Brennan said "Love Me" is "[desperate] to be liked, and, strangely enough, it is sort of likable", while writing its flamboyance displays a willingness to crash and burn. Mitch Mosk of Atwood Magazine highlighted the song's energy and self-awareness, calling it "an entity unto itself" that is new, polished and different. Snapes praised the "zeitgeist-capturing" couplet "I'm just with my friends online and there's things we'd like to change", noting that the track's lyrics make Healy "sound like the trustafarian street poet that he already slightly resembles". Andy Baber of musicOMH praised the "bold" chorus and called "Love Me" a "funky" stylistic curveball, saying it demonstrates the band's desire to push the boundaries of their sound.

== Commercial performance ==
In The 1975's native United Kingdom, the song peaked at number 20 on the UK Singles Chart and number ten in Scotland. "Love Me" was later certified gold in the UK by the British Phonographic Industry (BPI), denoting sales of over 400,000 units. Elsewhere in Europe, it reached number 42 in Ireland. In the United States, "Love Me" peaked at number 7 on the US Billboard Hot Rock & Alternative Songs chart and reached number 90 on its year-end edition. Additionally, the song peaked at number 26 on the US Billboard Rock Airplay chart and number 100 on the US Billboard Hot 100 chart. Elsewhere in North America, the track reached number 32 on the Billboard Canada Rock Songs chart. In Australia, "Love Me" peaked at number 35.

== Music video ==
=== Background and release ===
An accompanying music video, directed by Diane Martel, was released on 28 October 2015. In developing the visual, The 1975 sought to capture the "neon-hued enthralling acquisition of success and excess", a "screaming" momentum and a "sexy daze". The band was extensively involved in the video's creative direction, and "very much" knew what they wanted to achieve. Healy's initial brief was based around a "sexually confused Edward Scissorhands [that] buys into his own self constructed nonsense". The singer envisioned the visual as being post ironic, funny, garish, self-aware and sexy. They chose to work with Martel because they had confidence she could execute their ideas properly, calling it a great collaboration.

=== Synopsis ===
In the video, Healy performs the song surrounded by cardboard cutouts of various celebrities.

The music video opens with various shots of The 1975 performing "Love Me" together, a woman dancing with a floating guitar and Healy singing in front of a troupe of women. The singer prances around shirtless, wearing leather trousers. In certain shots, Healy is shown with his chest covered in stamps showing a headshot of an old photo of himself. The clip is evocative of Richey Edwards' NME cover photo, in which his torso is covered in ink versions of Marilyn Monroe. Singing the lyrics "I'm just with my friends online", he gestures to cardboard cutouts of Harry Styles, Rita Ora, Miley Cyrus, Charli XCX, Ed Sheeran and Elvis Presley, among others. Healy proceeds to kiss the cutout of Styles. In the second verse, the visual is interspersed with shots of a pink hot tub, which is variously filled with The 1975 and Healy with a leotard-clad girl. Additionally, two women are shown dancing with giant yellow balloons that spell the band's name. Healy pours out champagne in several scenes, handing a glass to Presley at one point that ends up in a puddle on the floor. During the guitar solo, Daniel mocks selfie culture by holding up a selfie stick and pouting for the camera, continuing to drum with one hand.

=== Response ===
In their review of the music video, the editorial staff of Alternative Press said: "Funky jams and sex appeal are nothing new for The 1975, but the Manchester quartet's newest single and accompanying visuals take it to another level." Hayden Manders of Nylon called the visual a "tongue-in-cheek, pink-hued commentary on what it means to be a rock-and-roll star in the digital age". Daly praised The 1975 for not following popular trends. He viewed the video as an attack on pop culture and wrote that it carries the same messages as the song itself, saying: "It's a call to arms to question how our society's evolved into one that's suffering from glued-to-the-screen tunnel vision." Shahlin Graves of Coup de Main called the visual a "scathing – and rather hilarious – mockery of fame in the Internet era and modern consumerist pop-culture". Johnson said she would be "watching [the video] a thousand times to make sense of it all". James Grebey of Spin called it a "hoot", writing that it is jokingly glamorous. Tasha Hegarty of Digital Spy called the music video "bonkers". Murphy said the visual was evocative of "gloriously" obnoxious pop bands of the 1980s, deeming it a "heap of fun and will easily hold your attention for nearly four minutes".

== Credits and personnel ==
Credits adapted from I Like It When You Sleep, for You Are So Beautiful yet So Unaware of It album liner notes.

- Matthew Healy – composer, producer, electric guitar, vocals, background vocals
- George Daniel – composer, producer, programming, synthesizer programming, drums, keyboards, synthesizer, percussion
- Adam Hann – composer, guitar
- Ross MacDonald – composer, bass guitar
- Mike Crossey – producer, programming, mixer
- Jonathan Gilmore – recording engineer
- Chris Gehringer – mastering engineer

== Charts ==
=== Weekly charts ===
Chart performance for "Love Me"
Chart (2015–2016)	Peak position
Australia (ARIA)	35
Canada Rock (Billboard)	32
Ireland (IRMA)	40
Scottish Singles Sales (Official Charts)	10
UK Singles (Official Charts)	20
US Billboard Hot 100	100
US Hot Rock & Alternative Songs (Billboard)	7
US Rock & Alternative Airplay (Billboard)	26

=== Year-end charts ===
2016 year-end chart performance for "Love Me"
Chart (2016)	Position
US Hot Rock & Alternative Songs (Billboard)	90

== Certifications ==
Certifications and sales for "Love Me"
Region	Certification	Certified units/sales
United Kingdom (BPI)	Gold	400,000^{‡}
United States (RIAA)	Gold	500,000^{‡}
^{‡} Sales+streaming figures based on certification alone.

== See also ==
- The 1975 discography
- List of songs by Matty Healy
