= A Change of Heart (The 1975 song) =

Single by The 1975

from the album I Like It When You Sleep, for You Are So Beautiful yet So Unaware of It
- Released: 22 February 2016
- Recorded: 2015
- Genre: Synth-pop; electropop
- Length: 4:43
- Label: Dirty Hit; Polydor Records
- Songwriters: Matthew Healy; George Daniel; Adam Hann; Ross MacDonald
- Producers: Matthew Healy; George Daniel; Mike Crossey

The 1975 singles chronology
"The Sound" (2016)	"A Change of Heart" (2016)	"She's American" (2016)

Music video
- "A Change of Heart" on YouTube

"A Change of Heart" is a song by English band The 1975 from their second studio album, I Like It When You Sleep, for You Are So Beautiful yet So Unaware of It (2016). The song was written by Matty Healy, George Daniel, Adam Hann and Ross MacDonald. Mike Crossey handled the production alongside Daniel and Healy. The song was released on 22 February 2016 by Dirty Hit and Polydor Records as the fifth single from the album. A synth-pop and electropop power ballad, the song features 808 beats, a portamento keyboard riff, pulsing synthesisers and elements of ambient pop, electro, new wave, yacht rock, chillwave and indie rock. The song's melancholic lyrics describe falling out of love and detail the end of a romance, focusing on the theme of technology.

Upon release, "A Change of Heart" received positive reviews from contemporary music critics, who praised the lyrics and production. The song later appeared on several year-end lists. Commercially, it reached number 127 on the UK Singles Chart, number 47 on the US Billboard Hot Rock & Alternative Songs and number 36 on the Billboard Alternative Airplay charts. The song was later certified silver in the United Kingdom by the British Phonographic Industry (BPI). An accompanying music video, written by Healy and directed by Tim Mattia, was released on 21 April 2016. The black and white tragicomic visual is based on Federico Fellini's film I clowns (1970), and follows Healy as a Pierrot-style clown engaging in a short-lived romance at an abandoned carnival.

== Background and release ==
During the song's premiere on Annie Mac's self-titled BBC Radio 1 show, Healy described it as a "simple song – three notes – and the truth" and a "very atypical '1975' song", saying the band wanted the track to convey serious conviction, self-awareness and beauty. On 22 February 2016, "A Change of Heart" was officially released as the album's fifth single.

== Music and lyrics ==
"A Change of Heart"
A 27-second sample of "A Change of Heart", showcasing the song's 808 beats, portamento keyboard riff and synthesiser solo.

Musically, "A Change of Heart" is a low-tempo synth-pop and electropop power ballad. The song has a length of four minutes and 43 seconds (4:43). Containing a retro sound, the track's light and airy production consists of synthetically charged choirs, a percolating rhythm, simple three-note repetitions, a pop hook, 808 beats, a backing drum beat, jittering guitars, a portamento keyboard riff, quietly reverberating and meandering synthesiser pulses, a whirring synthesiser solo, lightly-tapped synth pads and a calming rock instrumentation. It also contains elements of ambient pop, electro, new wave, yacht rock, chillwave and indie rock. Ryan Reed of Rolling Stone described it as a "John Hughes-worthy synth-pop ballad", while James Grebey of Spin called it a "relaxing, floaty throwback to decades past" and Chris Ingalls of PopMatters said it "[sounds] like it was transported from 1987 and wouldn't sound at all out of place on some big-haired college radio DJ's late-night playlist".

Lyrically, "A Change of Heart" is a melancholic song that deals with falling out of love. Healy sings of a woman with whom he is romantically involved, before admitting that her appearance alone cannot sustain their relationship. The singer openly admits his superficial flaws, revealing his partner's appearance both initially attracted and later repulsed him. He points out her quirks while making derogatory remarks, singing: "And you were coming across as clever / Then you lit the wrong end of your cigarette". Healy also comments on his own behaviour in the couplet "I’ll quote On the Road like a twat". Conversely, the singer's partner says he looks terrible and is riddled with diseases. Returning to the theme of technology explored in "Love Me", the song analyses connection in the digital age, describing a partner more interested in being on their phone than with the relationship. As they become more connected on social media, they become disconnected from one another in reality, with Healy singing: "And then you took a picture of your salad/And put it on the internet". Ultimately, the singer breaks down into tears when the relationship has concluded.

== Reception ==
Upon release, "A Change of Heart" was met with positive reviews from contemporary music critics. Billboard deemed "A Change of Heart" the best rock and alternative song of 2016; describing it as an "incandescent synthpop tale of a relationship crumbling apart", editor Chris Payne praised the songwriting, narrative and alluring quality. Spin ranked the song at number 59 on their 2016 year-end list, with Anna Gaca commending the "exquisitely" gentle sound, haunting synth and "tragically" ironic depiction of modern love, calling it a "wooning, shimmering heartbreaker of a pop ballad". NPR included the track on their mid-year best of 2016 list; Daoud Tyler-Ameen declared it the most undeniable song from I Like It When You Sleep, for You Are So Beautiful yet So Unaware of It. He praised the slight, sweet and underpunctuated lyrics—comparing them to 2016 Twitter poetry—and the singer's accent, saying its "lushness swallows you whole". Paste ranked "A Change of Heart" at number 16 on their list of The 1975's essential songs, calling it the "calm before the relapse in 'Somebody Else'".

Neil O'Sullivan of Financial Times called "A Change of Heart" excellent, while Maledine Roth of MTV News said the song is a "soul-wrenching (but admittedly beautiful) heap of sadness". Michael Hann of The Guardian called the track bleak and beautiful, deeming the line "You said I'm full of diseases, your eyes were full of regret / And then you took a picture of your salad and you put it on the internet" as 2016's best couplet. Celia Cummiskey of Euphoria Magazine highlighted Healy's delicate vocals and ability to mask a complicated emotional dilemma within the song's "deceptively upbeat" sound, while comparing "A Change of Heart" to Peter Gabriel's work in the 1980s. Allan Raible of ABC News observed a "syrupy, yet enjoyable" track that "recalls groups like OMD and When in Rome". Annie Zaleski of The A.V. Club said Healy "upends the sensitive-poet stereotype with a knowing wink" and Rhian Daly of NME called the song the most self-referential track on the album. In The 1975's native United Kingdom, "A Change of Heart" peaked at number 127 on the UK Singles Chart and was later certified silver by the British Phonographic Industry (BPI), denoting sales of over 200,000 units in the UK. In the United States, the song peaked at number 47 on the US Billboard Hot Rock & Alternative Songs.

== Music video ==
An accompanying music video, directed by Tim Mattia, was released on 21 April 2016. The black and white visual is based on Federico Fellini's film I clowns (1970), while also taking inspiration from Michael Jackson's tribute to Charlie Chaplin, The Wiz (1978), Gene Kelly and Bob Fosse. The video features Healy—who wrote the visual—in the role of the protagonist; a Pierrot-style melancholy clown. Regarding the video's meaning, the singer said: "I want to convey the sense of resignation in being a clown. I am, have been and will always be a clown. I think it can tire people." The visual begins with Healy entering an abandoned, yet still operating carnival, and he begins to dance. The singer encounters a female clown and they dance together before running to the bumper cars. The pair adventure throughout the park, illustrating the strengthening of their relationship. Healy and the woman dance, play carnival games, do magic tricks and eat popcorn, while spirited dance sequences are interspersed. Once the weight of their romance becomes apparent, the female clown grows tired of the singer's silliness and leaves him in the video's denouement. The final shot shows Healy alone on a park bench underneath a raincloud, which leaves him soaking wet.

Grant Sharples of Alternative Press included "A Change of Heart" on his list of 10 music videos from The 1975 that should be made into feature-length films, saying: "The video is a clever reference to The 1975’s early black-and-white videos, but it adds an old-school cinema twist that’s unique to itself." Gaca commended the "bittersweet" video, calling it tragicomic. Reed also deemed the visual a tragicomedy, praising its vividness while noting it "[charts] the highs and lows of a tragicomic clown romance". Roth praised the "bittersweet" music video, while Tom Connick of DIY said it presents a darker side of clown life, writing: "It’s not all fun and games being a clown ... Sometimes, though, it’s actually a bloody nightmare." Payne praised Healy's acting and improvisation, noting the visual likely took a great deal of time to rehearse.

== Credits and personnel ==
Credits adapted from I Like It When You Sleep, for You Are So Beautiful yet So Unaware of It album liner notes.

- Matthew Healy – composer, producer, electric guitar, vocals, background vocals
- George Daniel – composer, producer, programming, synthesizer programming, drums, keyboards, synthesizer, percussion
- Adam Hann – composer, electric guitar
- Ross MacDonald – composer
- Mike Crossey – producer, programming, mixer
- Jonathan Gilmore – recording engineer
- Chris Gehringer – mastering engineer

== Charts ==
Chart performance for "A Change of Heart"
Chart (2016–17)	Peak position
UK Singles (OCC)	127
US Hot Rock & Alternative Songs (Billboard)	47

== Certifications ==
Certifications and sales for "A Change of Heart"
Region	Certification	Certified units/sales
United Kingdom (BPI)	Silver	200,000^{‡}
^{‡} Sales+streaming figures based on certification alone.

== See also ==
- The 1975 discography
- List of songs by Matty Healy
