= I Like It When You Sleep, for You Are So Beautiful yet So Unaware of It =

Studio album by The 1975
- Released: 26 February 2016
- Recorded: January – October 2015
- Studios: Ravenscourt, London; The Ranch, Woodland Hills, California
- Genres: Electronic; pop; R&B; new wave; indie rock; dance-rock; soul; dream pop
- Length: 73:55
- Labels: Dirty Hit; Polydor; Vagrant; Interscope
- Producers: Matthew Healy; George Daniel; Mike Crossey

The 1975 chronology
The 1975 (2013)	I Like It When You Sleep, for You Are So Beautiful yet So Unaware of It (2016)	A Brief Inquiry into Online Relationships (2018)

Singles from I Like It When You Sleep, for You Are So Beautiful yet So Unaware of It
- 1. "Love Me" Released: 8 October 2015; 2. "Ugh!" Released: 10 December 2015; 3. "Somebody Else" Released: 15 February 2016; 4. "The Sound" Released: 19 February 2016; 5. "A Change of Heart" Released: 22 February 2016; 6. "She's American" Released: 11 November 2016; 7. "Loving Someone" Released: 3 February 2017

I Like It When You Sleep, for You Are So Beautiful yet So Unaware of It (stylised in sentence case) is the second studio album by English band The 1975, released on 26 February 2016 through Dirty Hit and Polydor. In 2014, frontman Matthew Healy released a series of cryptic tweets containing lyrics from the album, revealing its title the following year. After their social accounts were deleted and reinstated with a new visual identity, the band officially confirmed the album in September 2015, a month before "Love Me" was released as the lead single. Over the course of five months, "UGH!", "Somebody Else" and "The Sound" were released as singles, with "A Change of Heart" released four days prior to release. "She's American" and "Loving Someone" were later released in November 2016 and February 2017 as the final singles.

Upon its release, the album received positive reviews from critics. Several publications, including Pitchfork, Rolling Stone, and The Guardian, listed it as one of the best albums of 2016. It was also a commercial success, topping the charts in the United Kingdom and the United States, and its box set received a nomination for Best Boxed or Special Limited Edition Package at the 2017 Grammy Awards.

NME later placed the album sixth on their list of the Best Albums of The Decade. Additionally, Stereogum, Pitchfork, and Billboard placed it 61st, 161st, and 82nd, respectively.

== Background ==
After the band released their self-titled debut, in 2013, they spent 2015 mostly recording a follow-up.

On 1 June 2015, the band's Twitter accounts were deleted, which caused mass speculation from both fans and media alike that the band had broken up. The next day, Healy reactivated the accounts and tweeted again, but revealed a cryptic and symbolic comic strip containing the message that the band had gone on hiatus. A blurred Instagram picture from Healy titled "The 1975-2" set anticipation for release. The same day, the social media accounts were reinstated.

The tweet by Healy was verified as the name for their second album later in October 2015 with "Love Me" (a "very funky new single", according to Spin) released on 8 October.

== Style ==
The band cited D'Angelo, Christina Aguilera, Jimmy Jam, Terry Lewis, Roberta Flack, My Bloody Valentine's Loveless, Boards of Canada, Kim Carnes, Scritti Politti, and Sigur Rós as inspirations for the record's 17 tracks. The album's sound has been described as pop, new wave, dance-rock, indie rock, pop punk and soul. It also incorporates synth-pop, jazz, post-rock, dance-pop and R&B elements.

== Promotion ==
=== Singles ===
On 8 October 2015, The 1975 released "Love Me" as a single from the album after announcement and was first played on BBC. On 10 December, they first played "UGH!", the second single from the album, on Apple Music's Beats 1.

"The Sound" was premiered on Radio 1 on 14 January 2016, and was released as a radio single on 19 February. The music video premiered 6 days after. "Somebody Else" debuted on Beats 1 with Zane Lowe on 15 February, and released on iTunes and Spotify on 16 February. The music video debuted on 7 July. The next single, "A Change of Heart" debuted on BBC Radio 1 with Annie Mac on 22 February. A video for "She's American" was filmed but never released. "Loving Someone" was released as the seventh single.

=== Tour ===
A tour for the album began on 9 November 2015 in Liverpool. The band played the United Kingdom in November and the United States in December 2015, Asia and Oceania in January 2016, Europe in March to April 2016, and the US from April to May 2016. They played nine festivals over the summer of 2016, including Firefly Music Festival in June and the Reading and Leeds Festivals in August.

On 25 July 2016 the band announced a North American Tour for the Fall, beginning on 1 and 2 October at The Meadows Music & Arts Festival, and then playing three dates in Mexico, the first ever in the country. The band concluded the tour headlining Latitude Festival in Henham Park, United Kingdom on 14 July 2017, stating that it was "the end an of an era, but the start of a new era, called 'Music for Cars'". It is estimated that as of July 2017, the band had done over 150 concerts for this album-cycle.

== Artwork ==
The album's artwork and design was created by Samuel Burgess-Johnson and photographed by David Drake.

For each song on the album, a pink neon sign was created and put against various locations to create nostalgia for the song, but to also detail the thematic material and complexity of each song through the photo's atmosphere. Burgess-Johnson worked closely with Healy to help with the placement. Several of these signs are now on display at venues in Liverpool and London, as well as in the band's native Manchester. The box set version of the album gained a nomination for the Grammy Award for Best Boxed or Special Limited Edition Package.

== Release and reception ==
The album was released on 26 February 2016. The US Target edition of the album includes two bonus tracks: a demo of "A Change of Heart" and the song "How to Draw".

Professional ratings
Aggregate scores
Source	Rating
AnyDecentMusic?	6.8/10
Metacritic	75/100
Review scores
Source	Rating
AllMusic	3.5/5 stars
The A.V. Club	B
Entertainment Weekly	B+
The Guardian	4/5 stars
NME	4/5 stars
Pitchfork	6.5/10
Q	4/5 stars
Rolling Stone	3/5 stars
Spin	8/10
The Times	4/5 stars

The record received mostly positive reviews from music critics. At Metacritic, the album has an average score of 75 out of 100, which indicates "generally favorable reviews" based on 24 reviews. Writing for Exclaim!, Ian Gormely noted that the band's ambition was perhaps their sole stumbling block, though pursuing all musical avenues makes the result "overstuffed, awkwardly titled and frequently brilliant." In Drowned in Sound's review of the album, they praised the album's eclecticism and lyricism, concluding, "What they've made is a bold body of work that sounds effortless and odd and sophisticated. What they do next is likely to be stadium-filling and bonkers and brilliant, but it matters little when what they're doing now is so sensational."

NME, who had previously been highly critical of the band, also praised the album for its scope and ambition, writing, "Any record that burrows as deep into your psyche as 'I Like It...' should be considered essential. It's hugely clever and wryly funny, too." Although music journalist Alexis Petridis noted that parts of the album were over-ambitious, he went on to claim that "[i]ncredibly, though, most of the time Healy gets away with it. That's sometimes because his observations are sharp – as a skewering of celebrity #squad culture, "you look famous, let's be friends / And portray we possess something important / And do the things we like" is pretty acute – but more usually because they come loaded with witty self-awareness and deprecation: the endless depictions of vacuous, coke-numbed girls he has met would get wearying were it not for the fact that he keeps turning the lyrical crosshair on himself." In a more mixed review, Rolling Stone criticised tracks like 'Lostmyhead' and 'Please Be Naked' for being 'boring-melty' but praised songs such as 'Somebody Else', 'Loving Someone' and 'Love Me'.

=== Accolades ===
Publication	Rank	List
Alternative Press	5	The 30 Best Albums of 2016
Billboard	8	The 50 Best Albums of 2016
Billboard	2	The 10 Best Rock/Alternative Albums of 2016
Billboard	82	The 100 Greatest Albums of the 2010s: Staff Picks
Clash	7	Clash Albums of the Year
Complex	26	The 50 Best Albums of 2016
Diffuser	17	Top 40 Albums of 2016
Digital Spy	3	The 20 Best Albums of 2016
DIY	Unranked	The 16 Albums That Shaped 2016
Drowned In Sound	3	Drowned In Sound's 16 Favourite Albums of 2016
Entertainment Weekly	24	EW's Best Albums of 2016
Gigwise	17	Gigwise's 51 Best Albums of 2016
The Guardian	24	Best Albums of 2016
Idolator	6	The 10 Best Albums of 2016
International Business Times	3	Best Albums of 2016
Los Angeles Times	5	The 10 Best Albums of 2016 Defined By Loss
The Maneater	1	Top 10 Alternative Albums of 2016
Mashable	10	Top 10 Albums of 2016
NME	1	NME's Albums of the Year 2016
NME	6	The Best Albums of The Decade: The 2010s
NPR	21	The 50 Best Albums of 2016
Pitchfork	161	The 200 Best Albums of the 2010s
PopMatters	2	The Best Pop Albums of 2016
PopMatters	19	The 70 Best Albums of 2016
Q	9	Q Magazine's 50 Best Albums of 2016
Rolling Stone	18	Top 50 Albums of 2016
Rolling Stone	1	The 20 Best Pop Albums of 2016
The Skinny	21	Top 50 Albums of 2016
Spin	5	The 50 Best Albums of 2016
Stereogum	21	The 50 Best Albums of 2016
Stereogum	61	The 100 Best Albums Of The 2010s
The Times	9	The Best Albums of 2016
Variance Magazine	10	The 50 Best Albums of 2016
Vice	66	The 100 Best Albums of 2016

== Commercial performance ==
The album became the group's second number one in the United Kingdom, debuting atop the UK Albums Chart, with combined sales of over 58,000. It became the group's first number one on the US Billboard 200 on the chart dating 19 March 2016, with 98,000 pure album sales in its debut week and 108,000 sps, while also setting the record for longest title of a Billboard number-one album with 71 characters. The next week, it fell to number 26, tying with Amos Lee's 2011 album Mission Bell for the fourth largest drop from number 1 as of January 2017. It also debuted at number one in Australia, New Zealand and Canada. The album was certified platinum by the British Phonographic Industry (BPI) for sales of over 300,000 copies in the United Kingdom. On 10 April 2017 the album was certified gold by the Recording Industry Association of America (RIAA) for combined sales and album-equivalent units of over 500,000 units.

== Track listing ==
All tracks are written by George Daniel, Matthew Healy, Adam Hann and Ross MacDonald.

No.	Title	Length
1.	"The 1975"	1:23
2.	"Love Me"	3:42
3.	"Ugh!"	3:00
4.	"A Change of Heart"	4:43
5.	"She's American"	4:30
6.	"If I Believe You"	6:20
7.	"Please Be Naked"	4:25
8.	"Lostmyhead"	5:19
9.	"The Ballad of Me and My Brain"	2:51
10.	"Somebody Else"	5:47
11.	"Loving Someone"	4:20
12.	"I Like It When You Sleep, for You Are So Beautiful yet So Unaware of It"	6:26
13.	"The Sound"	4:08
14.	"This Must Be My Dream"	4:12
15.	"Paris"	4:53
16.	"Nana"	3:58
17.	"She Lays Down"	3:58
Total length:		73:55

Target bonus tracks
No.	Title	Length
18.	"A Change of Heart" (demo)	4:42
19.	"How to Draw"	4:03
Total length:		82:40

== Personnel ==
Credits adapted from liner notes and Tidal.

The 1975

- Matthew Healy – vocals (all tracks except 7), background vocals (2–6, 8–16), electric guitar (2–6, 8–10, 12–16), piano (7), keyboards (10, 13), acoustic guitar (16, 17), production (all tracks)
- Adam Hann – electric guitar (2–6, 8–10, 12–16)
- Ross MacDonald – bass guitar (2, 5, 6, 8, 9, 14, 15), upright bass (16)
- George Daniel – programming (1–16), drums (2–6, 8, 9, 14–16), keyboards (2–6, 8–16), percussion (2–6, 8, 9, 14–16), synthesiser (2, 8–16), synthesiser programming (3–6), production (all tracks)

Additional musicians

- Mike Crossey – programming (1–6, 8, 9, 11–16)
- Jonathan Gilmore – programming (1, 5, 6, 8, 13, 14, 16)
- Jason McGee – conducting (1, 6, 13, 14)
- Cassandra Grigsby-Chism, Nicole King-Morgan, Crystal Lewis, Crystal Butler, Sharetta Morgan-Harmon, Quishima Dixon, Carisa Moore, Fallynn Oliver, Edward Lawson, Marquee Perkins, James Connor, Vernon Burris, Derrick Evans, Anika Weibe, Monique Sullivan – choir vocals (1, 6, 13, 14)
- John Waugh – saxophone (5, 7, 14)
- Roy Hargrove – flugelhorn (6)
- Miguel Atwood-Ferguson – violin, viola, cello, string arrangement (8)
- Jamie Squire – synthesiser (13)

Technical

- Mike Crossey – production, mixing
- Jonathan Gilmore – engineering, programming
- Chris Gehringer – mastering

Artwork

- Samuel Burgess-Johnson – art direction, design, photography
- David Drake – photography
- Edward Emberson – inlay photography

== Charts ==
=== Weekly charts ===
Chart (2016)	Peak position
Australian Albums (ARIA)	1
Austrian Albums (Ö3 Austria)	10
Belgian Albums (Ultratop Flanders)	14
Belgian Albums (Ultratop Wallonia)	62
Canadian Albums (Billboard)	1
Czech Albums (ČNS IFPI)	30
Danish Albums (Hitlisten)	31
Dutch Albums (Album Top 100)	19
French Albums (SNEP)	87
German Albums (Offizielle Top 100)	28
Hungarian Albums (MAHASZ)	39
Irish Albums (IRMA)	3
Italian Albums (FIMI)	21
Japanese Albums (Oricon)	28
New Zealand Albums (RMNZ)	1
Norwegian Albums (VG-lista)	9
Portuguese Albums (AFP)	15
Scottish Albums (Official Charts)	1
South Korean Albums (Gaon)	30
South Korean International Albums (Gaon)	1
Spanish Albums (Promusicae)	23
Swedish Albums (Sverigetopplistan)	15
Swiss Albums (Schweizer Hitparade)	19
UK Albums (Official Charts)	1
US Billboard 200	1
US Top Alternative Albums (Billboard)	1
US Top Rock Albums (Billboard)	1

=== Year-end charts ===
Chart (2016)	Position
Australian Albums (ARIA)	57
South Korean International Albums (Gaon)	43
UK Albums (OCC)	25
US Billboard 200	99
US Top Alternative Albums (Billboard)	14
US Top Rock Albums (Billboard)	13

Chart (2017)	Position
UK Albums (OCC)	91
US Top Rock Albums (Billboard)	65

== Certifications ==
Region	Certification	Certified units/sales
Denmark (IFPI Danmark)	Gold	10,000^{‡}
New Zealand (RMNZ)	Platinum	15,000^{‡}
Singapore (RIAS)	Gold	5,000^{*}
United Kingdom (BPI)	Platinum	300,000^{‡}
United States (RIAA)	Gold	500,000^{‡}
^{*} Sales figures based on certification alone.^{‡} Sales+streaming figures based on certification alone.

== See also ==
- The 1975 discography
- List of songs by Matty Healy
