= K.I.D (band) =

Canadian garage pop and indie rock band

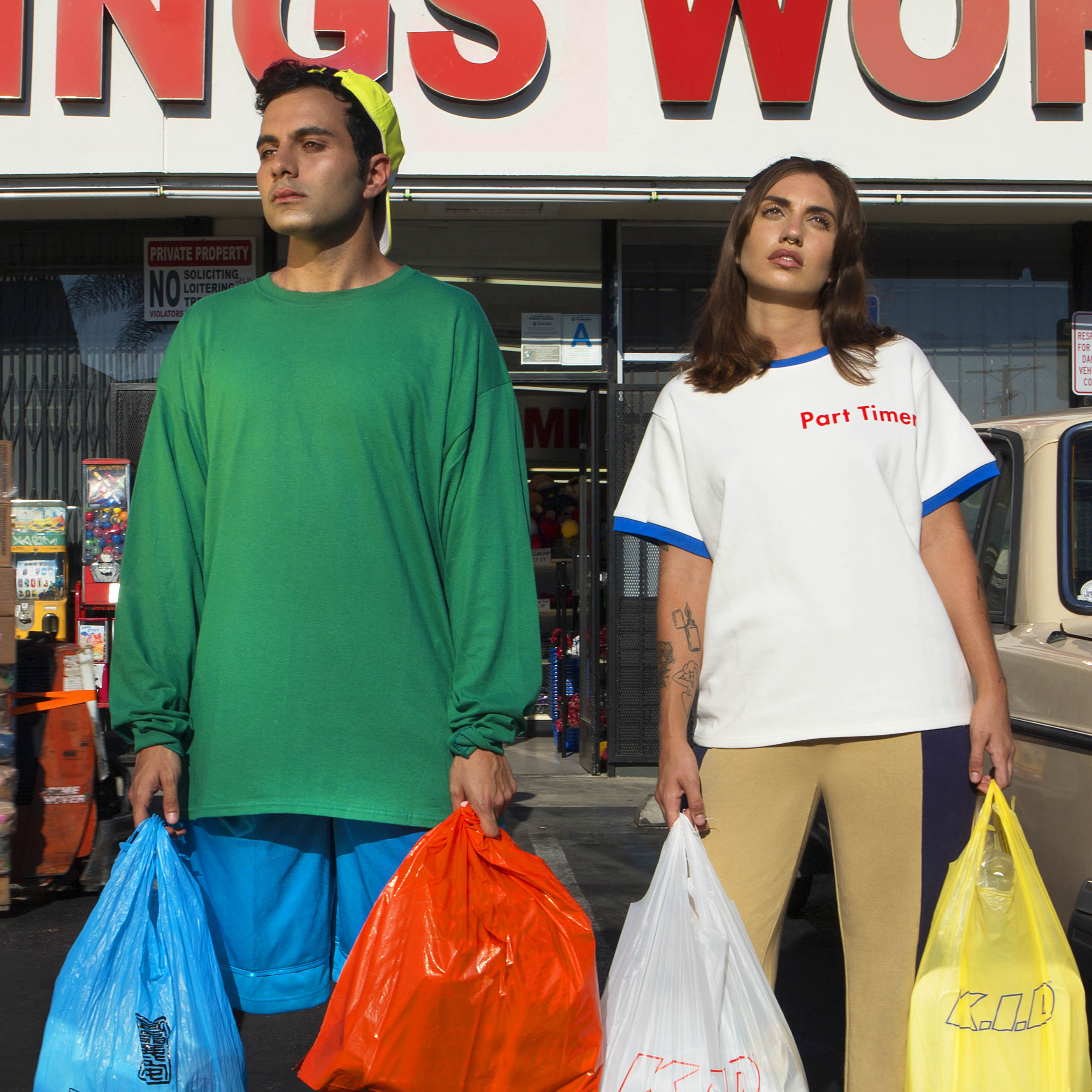
- Press Picture

Background information
- Origin: Mississauga, Ontario, Canada
- Genres: Garage pop; indie rock
- Labels: Universal Music Canada, Columbia Records
- Members: Kara Lane, Bobby Lo
- Website: K.I.D official Instagram

K.I.D is a Canadian garage pop and indie rock band created in 2014 by Kara Lane and Bobby Lo from Mississauga, Ontario, Canada.

K.I.D released their debut EP K.I.D in 2014 at Virgin Records Canada, a subsidiary of Universal Music Canada, featuring their first single "I Wish I was your Cigarette". In May 2016, the band signed with Columbia records for the world, excluding Canada. They also released a number of singles at Columbia Records including their debut single "Errors" in September 2016. The video for "Errors" was directed by Nadia Lee Cohen.

The band is managed by Merck Mercuriadis of Hipgnosis Music Ltd., publisher and record label in London and Los Angeles.

== History ==
In high school, singer Kara Lane from Washington and friend Chris Rabba from Toronto enjoyed smoking cigarettes during class hours. They traveled to the city to perform at "Elvis Mondays", an open mic night for Toronto bands and also performed at Mediterranean restaurants. Then, Kara appeared as the band's front woman because of her vocal range and stage presence. Bobby finds his voice as a lyricist and began drafting songs about sexual frustration, acne, nihilism, and his struggle with clinical depression. K.I.D searched for a producer to help them craft a garage-style album that can resonate with a generation in search of non-traditional bands. As a result, the band meets with Mike Crossey, producer of The 1975, Wolf Alice, Arctic Monkeys, and Foals infamy. The producer liked the song "I Wish I Was Your Cigarette" and met K.I.D at a show in London to express his interest. The band released in 2015, their new single "Errors", as a follow-up to their indie hit "I Wish I Was Your Cigarette."

== Releases ==
Year	Release
2015	K.I.D – EP
2016	"Errors" – Single "Taker" – Single
2017	Poster Child – EP "Boy" (feat. Cupcakke) – Single
2018	Tired All The Time – Album

== See also ==
- Music of Canada
- Canadian rock
- List of bands from Canada
