= You Don't Own Me (Pale Waves song) =

- Cover art for the digital download

Single by Pale Waves

from the album Who Am I?
- Released: 29 January 2021
- Recorded: 2020
- Genre: Pop-punk
- Length: 3:16
- Label: Dirty Hit
- Songwriters: Heather Baron-Gracie; Sam de Jong
- Producer: Rich Costey

Pale Waves singles chronology
"Easy" (2021)	"You Don't Own Me" (2021)	"Fall to Pieces" (2021)

Music video
- "You Don't Own Me" on YouTube

"You Don't Own Me" is a song by indie pop band Pale Waves.

== Music and lyrics ==
"You Don't Own Me" is a pop-punk song that was written by Pale Waves frontwoman Heather Baron-Gracie, and the singer-songwriter Sam de Jong; it is played in the key of C♯ minor and at 170 beats per minute. Described by Stitched Sound as a "empowering, guitar-heavy release of frustration", "You Don't Own Me" opens with a "gritty chugging guitar" riff that plays over the song's verses. The song then "transition[s] into a punk-pop [chorus] melody, which Avril Lavigne would be proud of".

Lyrically, "You Don't Own Me" is a repudiation of sexism and gender norms. In an interview with NME, Baron-Gracie explained that the track is "about what it’s like to be a woman in this world ... [It discusses] how society depicts, judges and criticises women on a daily basis. ... I also wanted to say a fuck you to everyone that plays by these fake delusional rules that women and gender need to fit inside a specific box." Many of the song's lyrics were inspired by instances of "sexist" and "inappropriate" behaviour directed at Baron-Gracie by men. The feminist ethos of the song is "unapologetic" and "angry" because, as Baron-Gracie put it, "we [i.e., women] are angry; we're sick of it!" Due to its message, Baron-Gracie has cited the track as "the most important on" Who Am I?

== Music video ==
The look of the "You Don't Own Me" music video has been described as "a love letter to early noughties emo and pop-punk".

The music video for "You Don't Own Me" was co-directed by Heather Baron-Gracie and her partner, Kelsi Luck. Released on 1 March, the video is "a love letter to early noughties emo and pop-punk"; the website Nü Sounds wrote that the visuals of "You Don't Own Me" are a "portal to early 2000s grunge; red hair, graffiti, all the works." The site also likened Baron-Gracie's dress to those worn by Melanie Martinez and called the overall production "a throwback of a lifetime".

== Release and reception ==
"You Don't Own Me" was released as the fourth single from Who Am I?, and it debuted on 13 January 2021.

== Personnel ==
Credits adapted from the liner notes of Who Am I?

Pale Waves

- Heather Baron-Gracie – vocals, guitar
- Ciara Doran – drums, synths, programming
- Hugo Silvani – guitar
- Charlie Wood – bass guitar

Technical

- Rich Costey – production
- Koby Berman – additional production
- Ciara Doran – additional production

== Release history ==
Release history and formats for "You Don't Own Me"
Country	Date	Format	Label	Ref.
Various	29 January 2021	Digital download, streaming	Dirty Hit	
