= She's My Religion =

Single by Pale Waves

from the album Who Am I?
- Released: 15 December 2020
- Recorded: 2020
- Genre: Pop punk; alternative pop
- Length: 3:09
- Label: Dirty Hit
- Songwriters: Heather Baron-Gracie; Sam de Jong
- Producers: Rich Costey; Sam de Jong

Pale Waves singles chronology
"Change" (2020)	"She's My Religion" (2020)	"Easy" (2021)

Music video
- "She's My Religion" on YouTube

"She's My Religion" is a song by indie pop band Pale Waves. It was released 15 December 2020 as the second single from the group's second studio album, Who Am I?

== Composition ==
=== Music ===
"She's My Religion", written in the key of E Major and played at 162 beats per minutes, was written by Pale Waves's guitarist and lyricist, Heather Baron-Gracie, along with songwriter Sam de Jong. The track was produced by Rich Costey. Musically, Baron-Gracie has described "She's My Religion" as "one of the darker-sounding songs on" Who Am I? and "completely different [from] anything [they had] ever put out there before".

=== Inspiration and lyrics ===
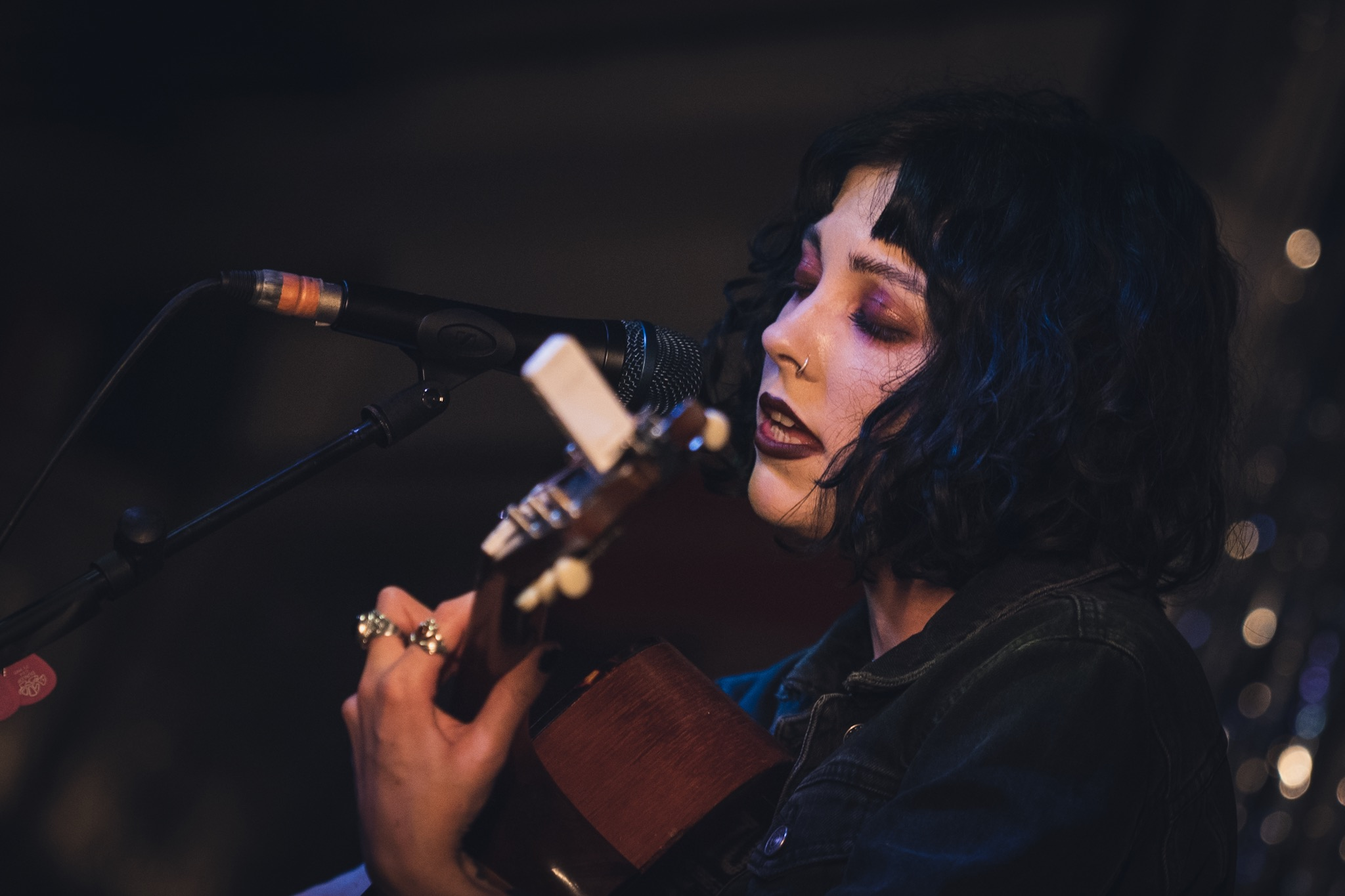
"She's My Religion" was written by Heather Baron-Gracie (pictured) and Sam de Jong about the former's partner, Kelsi Luck.

Baron-Gracie wrote "She's My Religion" about her partner, Kelsi Luck. When speaking to Pride Magazine, Baron-Gracie explained: "[The song] describes her as a person, and I wanted that. There are so many songs on the album [that are] about me, so I was like, 'Hey! For a second, I'm going to give the spotlight to somebody else.'" While "She's My Religion" is a love song, Baron-Gracie conceived it to not be "standard or typical"; what sets "She's My Religion" apart from others, Baron-Gracie argued, is that the song emphasizes the importance of "lov[ing] someone in their entirety" and not simply their positive attributes. For this reason, during the chorus, Baron-Gracie describes Luck with a variety of adjectives including "cold", "dark", and "cynical". When Baron-Gracie played the track to Luck for the first time, the latter was confused why the former was using this sort of critical language in a love song. In an interview with Line of Best Fit, Baron-Gracie elaborated:

At first she was just staring at me like, 'what the fuck? Why are you telling everyone this about me?' And then I explained: I didn't want to go with the cliché love song. I have that on the album – I have 'Easy', that’s the 'I'm so in love with you' moment. I wanted to do it in a different way. Society might view all these things as negative, but I think to genuinely love someone, and to love them as an entirety, you have to love every single part of them. Even what people view as negative, or what you view as negative. And then she got it: it's discussing a person's darker and negative sides and saying, 'I even love those things about you.'"

"She's My Religion" marked the first time that Baron-Gracie's lyrics were unambiguous with regard to her sexuality. Because of its impactful and openly queer lyrics, Baron-Gracie wanted the track to represent the LGBTQ+ community in the "most honest and sincere way." In a 2020 interview with Pride, Baron-Gracie contrasted "She's My Religion" with songs like Katy Perry's "I Kissed a Girl", saying: "There's not a lot of songs that [handle female queerness] in an appealing way. It's either experimental or playful. I just think it affects [gay women] and it knocks us back, especially when straight women do it." Later, in a 2021 interview with the University of Bristol's newspaper Epigram, Baron-Gracie expressed similar frustration with this fetishization of queerness, rhetorically asking: "Can you not just represent [female queerness] in a real-life situation? Do you have to oversexualise it? Represent it for what it truly is."

When asked about the song's religious references, Baron-Gracie contended that the song was both a "rebellion against religion" and in opposition to "non-religious people who disregard same-sex relationships". Regarding the former angle, she later told Ladygunn magazine: "Religious [people] in general can sometimes really not accept same-sex relationships or same-sex love, so [the titular lyric] was kind of a play off that." But Baron-Gracie also argued that there was a positive connection between religiosity and her feelings for Luck: "I feel like a lot of people are religious because they find great comfort in it and it brings them strength. It brings them a sense of being, and that’s what this love has given me."

== Music video ==
A video for the single, directed by Jess Kohl and starring Baron-Gracie and Kelsi Luck, was released on 22 December. The video follows the two "on a misty winding road, in a deserted meadow, and in a dimly lit country house".

In an interview with Pride magazine, Baron-Gracie noted that the video was the band's first in which viewers clearly and unambiguously "see [her] intimate with someone". Because the video depicted her "real life relationship", Baron-Gracie was nervous to film the video. While speaking to Jess Iszatt of the Official Charts Company's Record Club, Baron-Gracie explained: "No one teaches you as an artist how much to put on show and how much to keep for yourself. And [with the video] I was letting people in even more ... So I did have a mini freak out about that." Having said that, Baron-Gracie also emphasized that the "video has connected with people more than any of the [other] videos for this campaign, so I'm really glad that we did that."

As of April 2024, the video has been viewed over 4.0 million times on YouTube.

== Reception ==
"She's My Religion" was released on 15 December 2020. Anna Govert of Fansided cited "She's My Religion" as an exemplar of "sapphic alt-pop", writing that the track "reclaim[s] religious trauma [by] highlighting sapphic love through those religious references". Govert also described the track (and Pale Wave's Who Am I?-era work in general) as the "queer answer to Avril Lavigne’s particular brand of pop punk".

"She's My Religion" was nominated for the Popjustice £20 Music Prize in 2021. In June 2023, Sophie Dunne of Women.com selected "She's My Religion" as one of thirteen "Songs By Queer Musicians For Every Stage Of Your Story", calling it the "lesbian anthem of our generation" and "a stunning portrayal of love".

As of May 2024, "She's My Religion" has been streamed 10.7 million times on Spotify.

== Personnel ==
Credits adapted from the liner notes of Who Am I?

Pale Waves

- Heather Baron-Gracie – vocals, guitar
- Ciara Doran – drums, synths, programming
- Hugo Silvani – guitar
- Charlie Wood – bass guitar

Technical

- Rich Costey – production
- Sam de Jong – production
- Koby Berman – additional production
- Ciara Doran – additional production

== Release history ==
Release history and formats for "She's My Religion"
Country	Date	Format	Label	Ref.
Various	15 December 2020	Digital download, streaming	Dirty Hit	
