= Change (Pale Waves song) =

- Cover art for digital download

Single by Pale Waves

from the album Who Am I?
- Released: 10 November 2020
- Recorded: 2020
- Genre: Emo pop
- Length: 2:52
- Label: Dirty Hit
- Songwriters: Heather Baron-Gracie; Sam de Jong
- Producers: Rich Costey; Sam de Jong

Pale Waves singles chronology
"One More Time" (2018)	"Change" (2020)	"She's My Religion" (2020)

Music video
- "Change" on YouTube

"Change" is a song by indie pop band Pale Waves. Released 10 November 2020, it served as the lead single from their second studio album, Who Am I?

== Music and lyrics ==
Performed in the key of G Major and played at 97 beats per minute, "Change" was written by Pale Waves's guitarist and lyricist, Heather Baron-Gracie along with Sam de Jong; it was produced by Rich Costey, with de Jong serving as co-producer. The track is a partially acoustic alternative rock song that has been compared to pop music from the turn of the millennium, with Steffanee Wang of Nylon arguing that the song possesses "Avril Lavigne-levels of grunge-pop cathartic release". The track marked a sonic break from the band’s previous synth-pop sound – a decision that was deliberate. "The aesthetic is completely different," Baron-Gracie emphasized in an interview with Atwood Magazine. "I feel like I've really just flipped the world upside-down. ... I just couldn't do another [80s-inspired] record."

Because "Change" was both the lead single from Who Am I? as well as its opening track, Pale Waves wanted the track to "let them know [the band was] back." Baron-Gracie thus wrote lyrics that were "unapologetic", with references to cunnilingus that were included to "shock people". In terms of writing, "Change" was actually one of the last tracks to be written. The impetus for what would eventually develop into the chorus of "Change" was a sense of frustration that Baron-Gracie felt towards certain people in her life, as she explained to Atwood Magazine:

When I wrote "Change," I was feeling really frustrated with a few people in my life because they weren't giving me what I needed or what I expected from them. That's how the concept came about... That, as humans, we set expectations that are too high of people which leads them unable to reach them. It's partially my fault, but on that particular day I was feeling this emotion more than ever and that's how the chorus came about.

Around this time, Baron-Gracie also noticed that the album did not have any songs about heartbreak. Although she wanted to touch upon this emotional experience, she herself had never before experienced severe heartbreak. To overcome this creative roadblock, Baron-Gracie "spoke to various people in [her] life about their experiences of heartbreak and put their stories into the song as well." The end result was thus "not just [Baron-Gracie's] story, [but] other peoples' stories, too".

== Music video ==
Heather Baron-Gracie in the music video for "Change". The musician's attire symbolizes the song's title concept, given that it marked a departure from Baron-Gracie's usual style.

The music video for "Change" was directed by Johnny Goddard. It was released on 10 November 2020, alongside an announcement about the album itself.

At various times throughout the video, Heather Baron-Gracie is shown laying supine in the grass, playing an acoustic guitar as she stares at the camera. During these scenes, Baron-Gracie is shown in a white dress with angel wings. This fashion choice was a break from the look of previous Pale Waves videos (in which Baron-Gracie usually donned dark "gothic" clothing) and was a deliberate attempt to visualize the song's titular concept. In an interview with Nylon Baron-Gracie expanded upon this creative choice, explaining that it also reflected her own musical evolution: "I really want[ed] to make a conscious decision to broaden the aesthetic and push myself and the boundaries that I gave myself to feel comfortable. ... Last [album] it was heavily dependent on the dark side. I feel like this time, I'm sort of trying to push it in the middle, just for fun and to keep things exciting."

As of April 2024, the video has been viewed over 1.3 million times on YouTube.

== Release and reception ==
"Change" was the first single to be released from Who Am I?, and it debuted on BBC Radio 1 on 10 November 2020. As of May 2024, "Change" has been streamed 10.9 million times on Spotify.

== Personnel ==
Credits adapted from the liner notes of Who Am I?

Pale Waves

- Heather Baron-Gracie – vocals, guitar
- Ciara Doran – drums, synths, programming
- Hugo Silvani – guitar
- Charlie Wood – bass guitar

Technical

- Rich Costey – production
- Sam de Jong – production
- Koby Berman – additional production
- Ciara Doran – additional production

== Release history ==
Release history and formats for "Change"
Country	Date	Format	Label	Ref.
Various	10 November 2020	Digital download, streaming	Dirty Hit	
