= Easy (Pale Waves song) =

Single by Pale Waves

from the album Who Am I?
- Released: 13 January 2021
- Recorded: 2020
- Genre: Pop punk, synth-pop
- Length: 2:54
- Label: Dirty Hit
- Songwriters: Heather Baron-Gracie; Sam de Jong
- Producer: Rich Costey

Pale Waves singles chronology
"She's My Religion" (2020)	"Easy" (2021)	"You Don't Own Me" (2021)

Music video
- "Easy" on YouTube

"Easy" is a song by indie pop band Pale Waves. Released 13 January 2021, it served as the third single from their second studio album, Who Am I?

== Music and lyrics ==
"Easy" was written by Pale Waves's guitarist and lyricist, Heather Baron-Gracie along with Sam de Jong; it was produced by Rich Costey. According to Baron-Gracie, "Easy" is the "feel good love song" on the album. "I feel like love is the most universal and most powerful emotion we experience," Baron-Gracie later explained in an interview with Apple Music. "Love can drive you to do crazy things [and "Easy" is] about how euphoric and uplifting love made me feel."

Originally this track was envisioned as a piano ballad, but "it didn't fit together". Despite optimistic lyrics, "on the piano, it ... sound[ed] sad and a bit depressing." When Baron-Gracie showcased the song for de Jong, the latter told her: "I love this song, but the music doesn't really suit what [you are] talking about, nor does it entirely represent the true meaning of 'easy'." Baron-Gracie and de Jong consequently reworked the song, metamorphosing it from a "depressing emo ballad" into an "uplifting, feel-good song". One element that was added to the song at this time was the heavier guitar riff that plays during the chorus. This riff was inspired by "grungy, super-catchy" guitar lines in songs by "strong female artists" like Courtney Love, Alanis Morissette, and Liz Phair. Initially, Baron-Gracie and de Jong debated whether the riff belonged in the final cut, but in the end, Baron-Gracie felt that it added "another element" to the song.

== Music video ==
According to Heather Baron-Gracie (pictured), the unique look of the "Easy" music video was inspired by the "gothic medieval aesthetic and ... Tim Burton films".

A video for "Easy" was released on 13 January 2021. Directed by James Slater, this video was inspired by the "gothic medieval aesthetic and ... Tim Burton films", according to Baron-Gracie. As of April 2024, the video has been viewed over 2.3 million times on YouTube.

== Release and reception ==
"Easy" was released as the third single from Who Am I?, and it debuted on 13 January 2021, premiering on BBC Radio 1. The song later peaked at number 43 on Radiomonitor's "UK Radio Airplay Top 50" chart.

== Personnel ==
Credits adapted from the liner notes of Who Am I?

Pale Waves

- Heather Baron-Gracie – vocals, guitar
- Ciara Doran – drums, synths, programming
- Hugo Silvani – guitar
- Charlie Wood – bass guitar

Technical

- Rich Costey – production
- Koby Berman – additional production
- Ciara Doran – additional production

== Charts ==
Chart performance for "Eighteen"
Chart (2021)	Peak position
UK Radio Airplay Top 50 (Radiomonitor)	43

== Release history ==
Release history and formats for "Easy"
Country	Date	Format	Label	Ref.
Various	13 January 2021	Digital download, streaming	Dirty Hit	
