= Who Am I? (Pale Waves album) =

Album by Pale Waves

Studio album by Pale Waves
- Released: 12 February 2021
- Recorded: 2020
- Studio: Los Angeles
- Genres: Pop-punk; Britpop
- Length: 33:39
- Label: Dirty Hit
- Producers: Rich Costey; Sam de Jong (Note: Koby Berman provided additional production on all tracks, and Ciara Doran provided additional production on tracks 1, 4, and 11.)

Pale Waves chronology
My Mind Makes Noises (2018)	Who Am I? (2021)	Unwanted (2022)

Singles from Who Am I?
- 1. "Change" Released: 10 November 2020; 2. "She's My Religion" Released: 15 December 2020; 3. "Easy" Released: 13 January 2021; 4. "You Don't Own Me" Released: 29 January 2021; 5. "Fall to Pieces" Released: 9 February 2021

Who Am I? is the second studio album by English indie pop band Pale Waves. It was released on 12 February 2021 by the independent record label Dirty Hit. The record was produced by Rich Costey and recorded in Los Angeles. While the band's previous album, My Mind Makes Noises (2018), took inspiration from 1980s synth pop, Who Am I? was inspired by female pop and rock musicians from the 1990s and early 2000s, including acts like Avril Lavigne, Liz Phair, Michelle Branch, Alanis Morissette, and Courtney Love.

All of the songs on Who Am I? were co-written by the band's lead vocalist and rhythm guitarist Heather Baron-Gracie; others were co-written by Sam de Jong, Suzanne Lyn Shinn, Jake Sinclair, and band drummer Ciara Doran. Many of the songs on the album revolve around themes of romance, love, acceptance, and queer sexuality, all of which were partially inspired by Baron-Gracie's romantic relationship with singer-songwriter Kelsi Luck. Baron-Gracie was further motivated to focus on LGBTQ+ themes after Doran came out as non-binary.

Who Am I? received mostly positive reviews, according to review aggregators Metacritic and AnyDecentMusic?, with critics commenting on the Pale Waves's change in style. Others discussed the impact of the artists whom Heather Baron-Gracie has cited as the album's influences. Many reviews appreciated the evolution in the band's style, comparing their newer sound to that of pop music from the early 2000s, although some felt that the record was too derivative of its influences. Upon its release, Who Am I? debuted at number three on the UK Albums Chart and at number one on the UK Independent Albums Chart. Who Am I? was supported by five singles ("Change", "She's My Religion", "Easy", "You Don't Own Me", and "Fall to Pieces" – all of which were promoted with their own music videos); due to the COVID-19 pandemic, Pale Waves was forced to postpone a tour supporting the album to 2022.

== Production ==
=== Background ===
In February 2020, three of the members from the band Pale Waves – Ciara Doran, Hugo Silvani, and Charlie Wood – were involved in a near-fatal road accident when travelling between shows in Sweden and Germany. (Note: Heather Baron-Gracie, the band's frontwoman, had taken a plane with her girlfriend, Kelsi Luck, and was not involved in the accident.) The bus they were in slid on an icy road and rolled into a ditch, and while no one was seriously injured, the band members have said it was nevertheless traumatic. On top of the road accident, the COVID-19 pandemic disrupted the planned release of the album, which had originally been slated for early 2020. Despite this setback, the band's frontperson Heather Baron-Gracie explained to NME magazine that quarantine allowed time for band members to have some "space and time to process what happened [with the road accident] and heal from it".

=== Inspiration and writing ===
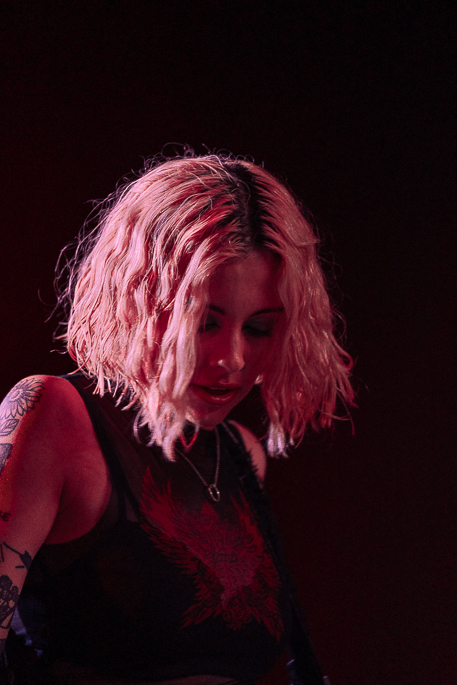
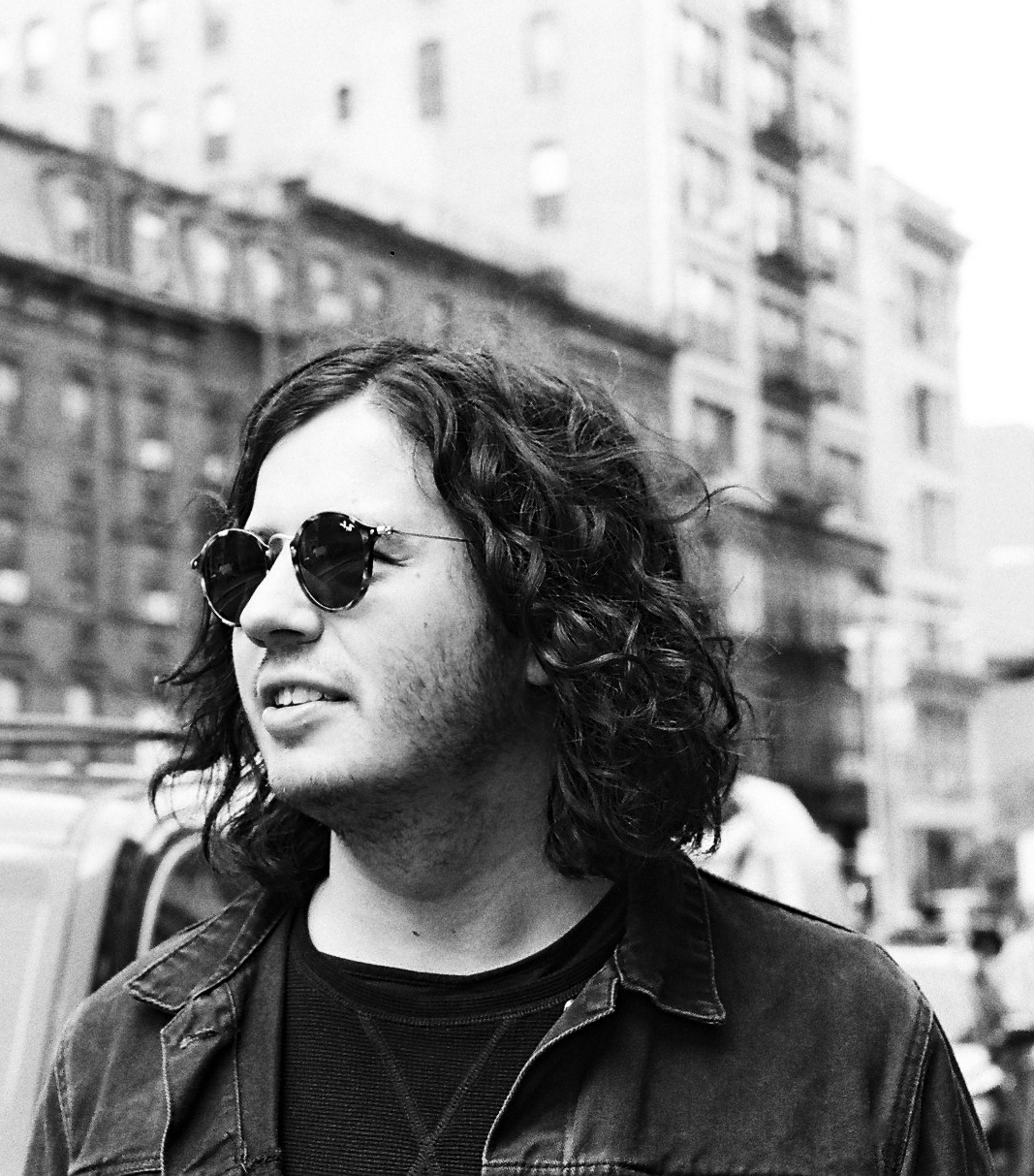
Most of the songs on Who Am I? were co-written by Pale Waves member Heather Baron-Gracie (left) and New Zealand songwriter Sam de Jong (right).

When writing for the album began, the members of Pale Waves struggled to craft songs that sounded different from those on their debut album. Baron-Gracie discussed this issue with Nylon magazine, explaining:

I think the first batch of demos we were trying to be too much like first album. ... I was done with the sort of '80s influenced pop style ... [and Ciara and I] both needed space artistically to create separately. We sort of overworked one another and we were exhausted and we just kept writing the same songs. So it got to the point where we both knew that we needed to take time apart from one another. I went off and I think I only wrote with maybe four people, and 50 percent of the album or more was done with the same guy, [New Zealand songwriter Sam de Jong], because we just hit it off so well. ... That was really freeing for me because I didn't have to sort of consider someone else's artistic vision.

Baron-Gracie later told Coup de Main magazine that when she first met de Jong, "it just instantly clicked" and that the two of them "basically [wrote] the whole album in a month." Baron-Gracie's decision to co-write with de Jong was a break with precedent, given that all of the band's previous songs had been co-written by Baron-Gracie and Doran (on this album, only "Run To" and "Who Am I?" were the product of Baron-Gracie and Doran). Baron-Gracie decided to work on music with other people to prevent creative burnout and engender new ideas: "It was uncomfortable at first because I've never been in a room and made or written music with anyone apart from Ciara before," Baron-Gracie told NME. "But I did it because we're a band and we need to carry on our career." While Baron-Gracie and de Jong worked on songs for this album, Doran worked with other artists to hone their production abilities. Jake Sinclair and Suzy Shinn also co-wrote songs for the album, contributing the tracks "Wish U Were Here" and "Run To", respectively.

The themes inherent to Who Am I? were heavily inspired by Baron-Gracie's romantic relationship with Kelsi Luck. So important was Luck to the record that in an interview with Vanity Fair, Baron-Gracie stressed that she "wouldn't have this record if it wasn't for Kelsi." Baron-Gracie then revealed that during the writing of the album, at a time when she found herself "a bit out of love with music", Luck had encouraged her to read through poems "that had really meant something to her". This helped rekindle Baron-Gracie's interest in lyrical expression, leading to the songs "You Don't Own Me" and "Wish U Were Here", both of which were inspired by poems that Luck had written. (Although Luck initially objected to Baron-Gracie's interpolation of her poetry, she eventually relented.) Baron-Gracie and Luck's relationship also resulted in the album focusing on LGBTQ+ themes. Although aware of her sexuality during the first album, Baron-Gracie felt that she "wasn't confident about [her]self or with [her] sexuality" to be open about it at the time. With Who Am I?, however, Baron-Gracie decided to use its lyrics to came out as gay. This was inspired both by her growing frustrations with many of her fans thinking she was straight, as well as by Ciara Doran's confidence and openness about being non-binary and using they/them pronouns. The decision to be honest with her lyrics caused Baron-Gracie to feel as if "a weight has been lifted off [her] shoulders".

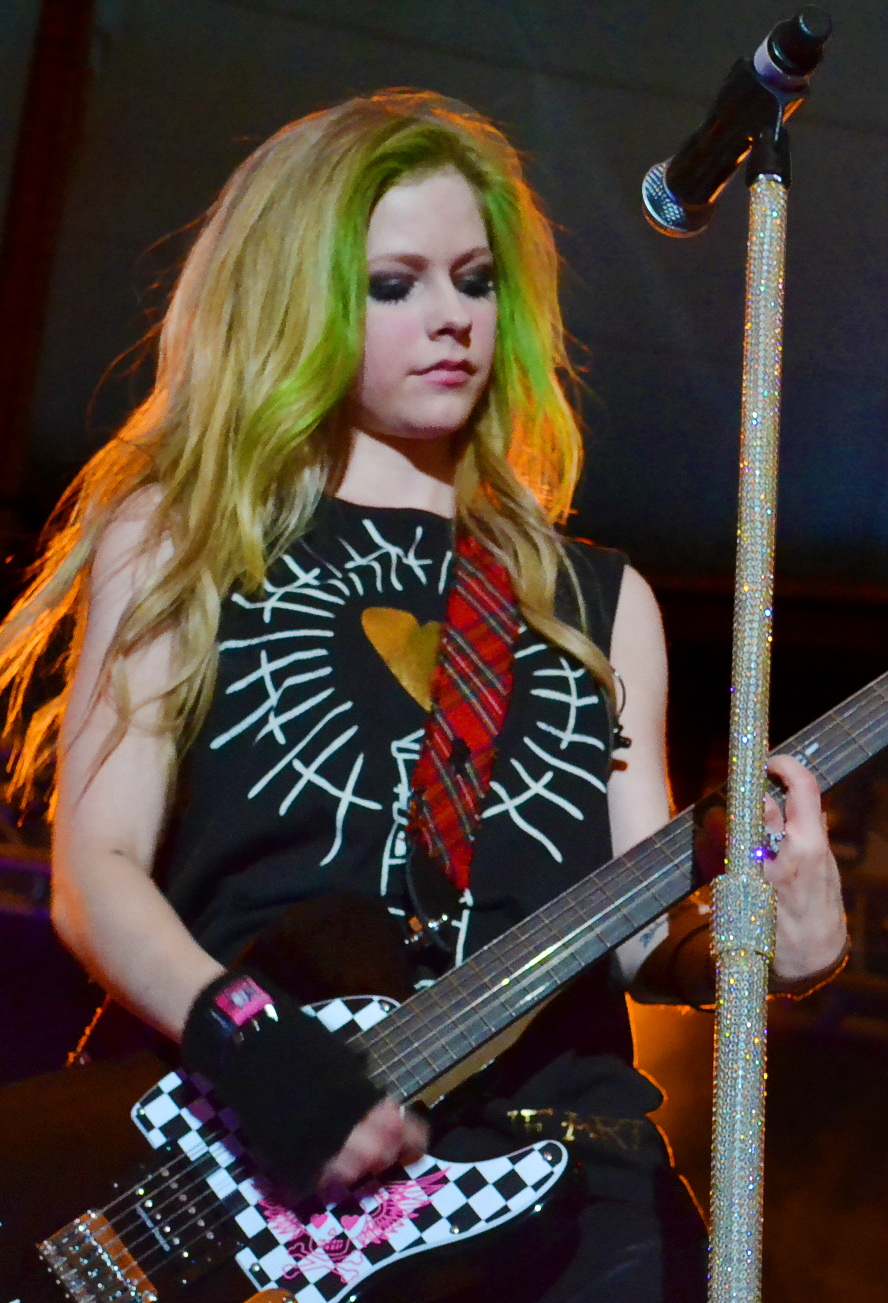
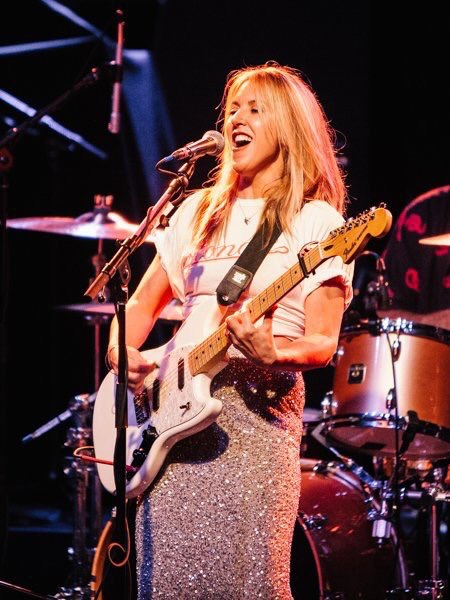
When writing the songs for Who Am I?, Heather Baron-Gracie was musically inspired by "strong female alternative artists", specifically citing Avril Lavigne (left) and Liz Phair (right) as influences.

Whereas Pale Waves's debut album My Mind Makes Noises (2018) had been inspired by 1980s music, Who Am I? takes greater inspiration from the alternative rock and pop rock of the 1990s and 2000s, with Baron-Gracie specifically citing Avril Lavigne, as well as artists like Alanis Morissette, Courtney Love, Liz Phair, Michelle Branch, and assorted country musicians as inspiration. Baron-Gracie also revealed in an interview with The Honey Pop that The Chicks and Kacey Musgraves inspired "the melodic side of [the] record." Regarding the album's influences, Baron-Gracie told NME, "I know there are a lot of my fans that love Avril so I know they're gonna dissect my album and know what I've pulled from Avril. I went back to my roots with this album with someone like Alanis as well. She's just unapologetic, and I wanted to be like that in this album." In an interview with Northern Chorus, Baron-Gracie commented on the change in style between the band's first and second albums, explaining that the transition "came naturally." "We were so young when we did the first album ... I didn't really know myself at the time and we were all quite new to it all," she explained, "but we had a bit more time to think about where we wanted to go [stylistically-speaking] on the second record". In the same interview, Baron-Gracie also called the shift from 80s-influenced music to a more pop punk sound "a necessary change," and she admitted that she "couldn't have done another record that was a twinkly 80's sound".

=== Recording ===
Who Am I? was primarily recorded in Los Angeles alongside producer Rich Costey who had previously worked with acts such as Foo Fighters, Muse and Biffy Clyro. The band chose to record in Los Angeles, California, as Baron-Gracie felt that "it's just a really encouraging and inspiring place because there are so many creative people". Despite Pale Waves often being described as the protégés of the 1975, the members of the latter band – who had previously helped produce the Pale Waves singles "Television Romance" and "There's a Honey" – had "zero involvement" with Who Am I? While speaking to The Big Issue North, Baron-Gracie revealed that the band had intended to feature a collaboration with the 1975 on the album, but these plans were abandoned because the band had "grown tired of being in [the 1975's] shadow."

Portions of the album were recorded with the entire band in Los Angeles, but when the COVID-19 pandemic hit in March 2020, the band members dispersed: Baron-Gracie and Doran remained in L.A. while guitarist Hugo Silvani and bassist Charlie Wood returned to the UK. Silvani and Wood would record their own parts remotely and send them to Baron-Gracie and Doran in L.A. Owing to COVID-19 containment and prevention protocols, the last segment of the album was recorded alone by Baron-Gracie with one other producer in the room. Social distancing guidelines meant that Baron-Gracie spent most of this time confined to the studio's vocal booth.

When the band was working on the album in the studio, the rock band Muse was recording in an adjacent room. According to Baron-Gracie: "They were really incredibly nice because they let us use loads of their equipment. And I actually recorded on Matt Bellamy’s vocal mic. He just lent it to me. He was like, 'Yeah, you can use this on your record, you can take any guitars that you want, and you can come in here when I’m not in here and play my piano.' And it was so cool of him to just let me use whatever I wanted." Bellamy was also going to perform some of the bass parts on the album, but as Baron-Gracie told DIY magazine: "We managed to do it over the internet with [Wood] in the end."

== Content ==
The album opens with "Change", a song that lyrically discusses the pain of heartbreak. According to Baron-Gracie, the song was one of the last tracks to be written for the album, and in an interview with NME she explained that it was one that she "knew [she] needed on the album, but [she] didn't have it yet." Lyrically, the song posed a challenge to Baron-Gracie because, at the time, she had never experienced severe heartbreak. She consequently spoke to people in her life who had, "gather[ing] their experiences" to make the lyrics as authentic as possible. Baron-Gracie wanted "Change" to serve as the album's opener because musically it was different from the band's previous work. The song's "unapologetic" references to oral sex were also a deliberate attempt by the band to "shock people" and "let them know [the band was] back." "Fall to Pieces" was inspired by the early, turbulent days of Baron-Gracie and Luck's relationship, when Baron-Gracie herself was "all over the place" mentally. Lyrically, "Fall to Pieces" details two individuals in a romantic relationship who keep falling into a loop of argumentation. Baron-Gracie stressed that while it is "kind of a negative song ... it has hope". "She's My Religion" is an open love song to Luck that celebrates "lov[ing] someone and their entirety" – and not simply their positive attributes. The song marked the first time that Baron-Gracie had been "so open about [her] sexuality." Because of its impactful and openly queer lyrics, Baron-Gracie wanted the track to represent the LGBTQ+ community in the "most honest and sincere way." Baron-Gracie contrasted "She's My Religion" with songs like Katy Perry's "I Kissed a Girl", telling Pride Magazine: "There's not a lot of songs that [handle female queerness] in an appealing way. It's either experimental or playful. I just think it affects [gay women] and it knocks us back, especially when straight women do it."

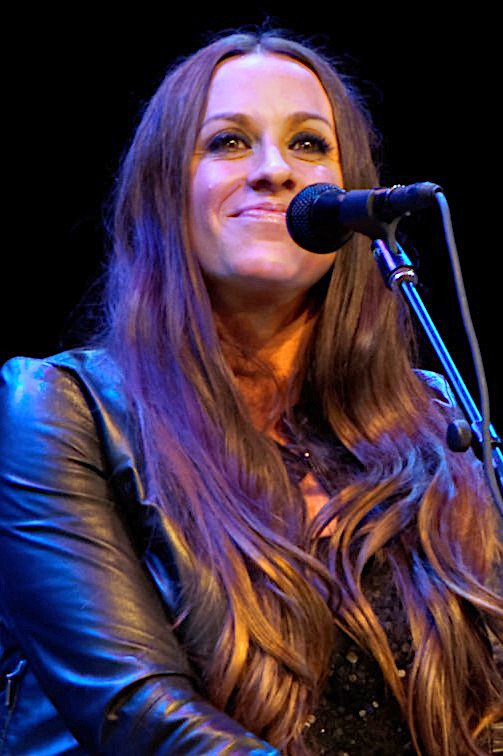
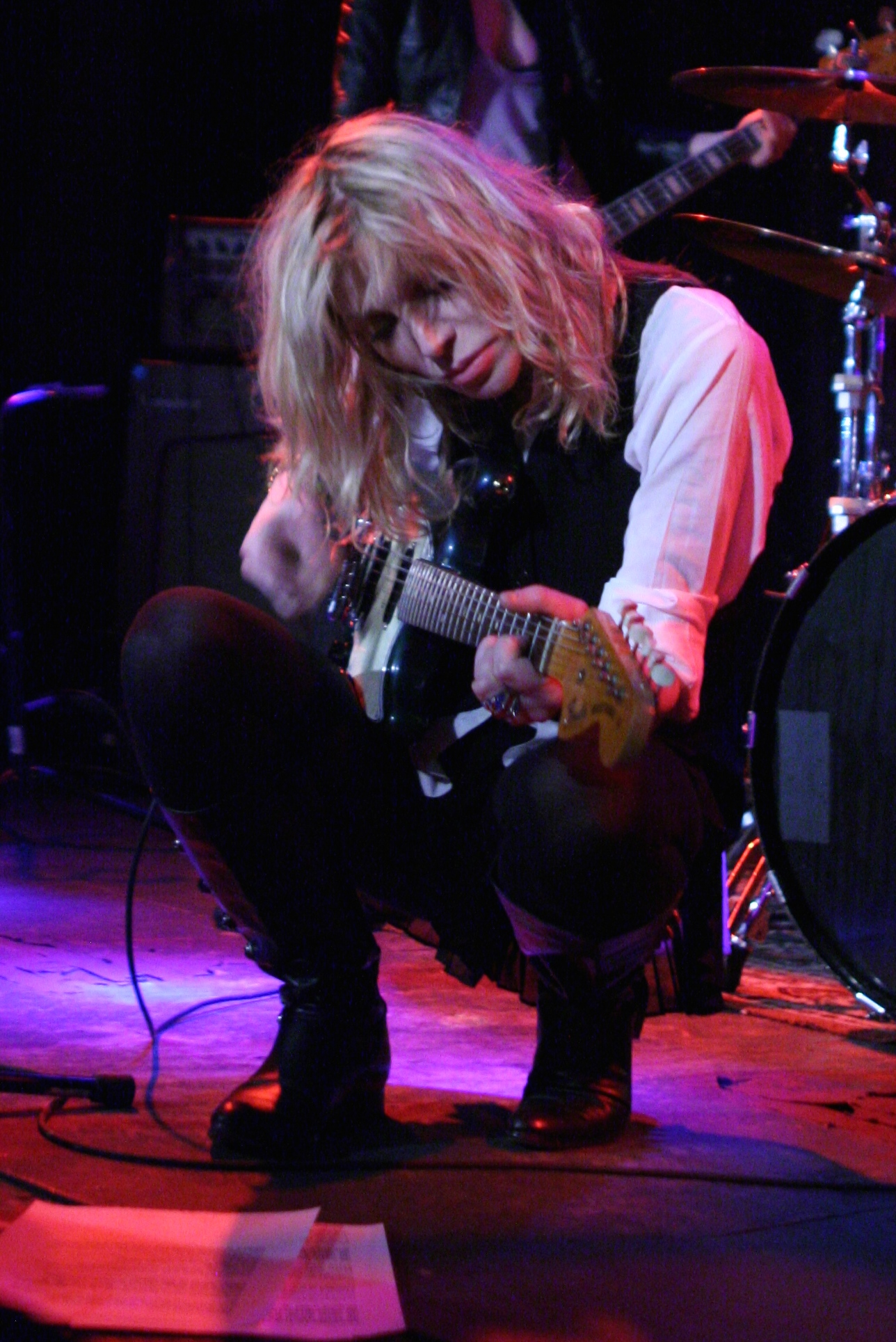
The heavier guitar riff featured in the chorus of "Easy" was inspired by the music of Alanis Morissette (left) and Courtney Love (right).

Baron-Gracie described "Easy" as the "feel good love song" on the album. Originally this track was envisioned as a piano ballad, but "it didn't fit together". Despite optimistic lyrics, "on the piano, it ... sound[ed] sad and a bit depressing." Baron-Gracie and Sam de Jong consequently reworked the song to be more upbeat. The heavier guitar riff that plays during the chorus was inspired by "grungy, super-catchy guitar riffs" in songs by "strong female artists" like Courtney Love, Alanis Morissette, and Liz Phair. Initially, Baron-Gracie and de Jong debated whether the riff belonged in the final cut, but in the end, Baron-Gracie felt that it added "another element" to the song. "Wish U Were Here", co-written by Baron-Gracie and Suzanne Lyn Shinn, was originally not slated for the album and was recorded when the band learned they had extra time in the studio. "Tomorrow" was the first track that Baron-Gracie wrote for the album, and thematically, it "made a pathway for this record". The song, which references and cheers on people in Baron-Gracie's life, was written "for the fans" to provide encouragement, and in an interview with Sophie Williams of NME Baron-Gracie explained that the song was her way of saying "I'm there for you. I've been through it too. Please continue to carry on." "You Don't Own Me" – a track that Baron-Gracie has called "the most important on the record" – is "about being a woman ... in society," Baron-Grace explained; "We've come a long way, but ... we don't have equality just yet." The song was inspired by many instances of "sexist" and "inappropriate" behaviour directed at Baron-Gracie by men. The feminist ethos of the song is "unapologetic" and "angry" because, as Baron-Gracie put it, "we [i.e., women] are angry; we're sick of it!"

Described as a "soft, tender, genuine moment on the album", the "dream-grunge" track "I Just Needed You" was written after Baron-Gracie "realign[ed] [her] priorities in life". The singer explained to Williams: "Society and the world can really sort of influence or trick you into believing that happiness is within materialistic things. ... You have to find happiness within." Baron-Gracie later told The Honey Pop that "the song is basically me rewiring and adjusting my perspective on what is going to bring me happiness." "Odd Ones Out" is a ballad through which Baron-Gracie expresses confusion as to how so many relationships fail. "I've seen so many experiences of this in my life," she explained to Williams. "I don't want to be an example of that. I didn't want my relationship to end up like those relationships. I wanted to be the odd one out." "Run To" was written as if it were a letter to Baron-Gracie's mother. Through this song, Baron-Gracie emphasises that she is doing alright and that her mother does not need to worry about her well-being. The album closer, "Who Am I?", was one of the final tracks written for the album and was initially composed while the band was on tour. The night she composed the song, Baron-Gracie locked herself in her bathroom for three hours to work out the details of the track. Lyrically, the song is Heather "screaming to [her]self essentially that [she] need[s] to figure out who [she is] as a human being and what [her] priorities are in life." While talking to NME, the singer explained: "This song just makes perfect sense. It has to be the finishing part of the album. ... This is a perfect album title."

== Promotion and singles ==
"Change", the first single to be released from Who Am I?, debuted on BBC Radio 1 on 10 November 2020; the single's music video, directed by Johnny Goddard, was also released at this time, alongside an announcement about the album itself. The album's second single, "She's My Religion", was released on 15 December 2020. A video for the single, directed by Jess Kohl and starring Baron-Gracie and Kelsi Luck, was released on 22 December; because of this, Baron-Gracie told Pride magazine that the video was the band's first in which "you really see [her] intimate with someone". The third single from the album, "Easy", was released on 13 January 2021. After premiering on BBC Radio 1, the track eventually peaked at number 43 on Radiomonitor's UK Radio Airplay Top 50 chart. According to Baron-Gracie, the music video for "Easy", which was directed by James Slater, was "inspired by the gothic medieval aesthetic and ... Tim Burton films".

"You Don't Own Me" was released on 29 January 2021 as the fourth single. The music video for the song – which was co-directed by Baron-Gracie and Luck – was released on 1 March, and was described by Nü Sounds music site as a "portal to early 2000s grunge; red hair, graffiti, all the works." The site also likened Baron-Gracie's dress to those worn by Melanie Martinez and called the overall production "a throwback of a lifetime". Following the "You Don't Own Me" video's premiere, the band also uploaded to YouTube a "behind the scenes" featurette that explored the directing of the video. The fifth and final single to be released was "Fall to Pieces" which likewise premiered on BBC Radio 1 on 9 February 2021. A video for the single, directed by Callum L. James, was released on 12 February. A "behind the scenes" look at the making of the "Fall to Pieces" music video was also released on 17 February via YouTube.

Because Who Am I? was released in the midst of the COVID-19 pandemic, Pale Waves was unable to promote the album by immediately touring. Baron-Gracie discussed this setback in an interview with Northern Chorus, saying, "We can't complain and be selfish with everything going on around us. We were lucky enough to create an album campaign and release videos, but not being able to tour was disappointing as it's a huge part of a new album release". The band eventually resumed touring in early 2022, performing their first concert since 2020 in Bristol on 11 February. In mid-2022, the band performed several shows in the United States, both as a headliner and as the opening act for 5 Seconds of Summer on their Take My Hand World Tour.

== Critical reception ==
Professional ratings
Aggregate scores
Source	Rating
AnyDecentMusic?	7.1/10
Metacritic	62/100
Review scores
Source	Rating
Billboard	Positive
DIY	3.5/5 stars
Dork	4/5 stars
Gigwise	7/10 stars
The Independent	2/5 stars
The Irish Times	3/5 stars
The Line of Best Fit	7/10 stars
NME	4/5 stars
Paste	Positive
Pitchfork	6.2/10
Rolling Stone	2/5 stars

Who Am I? was met with generally favourable reviews from critics. At Metacritic, which assigns a weighted average rating out of 100 to reviews from mainstream publications, this release received an average score of 62 based on 7 reviews. Fellow music aggregator AnyDecentMusic? gave the album an average score of 7.1/10.

Jason Lipshutz of Billboard applauded the record's "crunchier guitar sound" and "buoyant pop hooks", and he named Who Am I? "one of the best indie-rock albums of the young year". Carli Scolforo of Paste magazine reviewed the album positively, writing that "the band translates their many inspirations into their own brand of indie pop that feels perfectly fit for 2021, with their lyrics bouncing between relationships, identity and mental health." Thomas Smith of NME awarded the album four out of five stars, and wrote that with the record, "the band capture their optimism of a new life worth living, but never shy away laying bare the challenges of doing so in times like these." Stephen Ackroyd of Dork magazine awarded the album four out of five stars, noting that "a hard left swing into late-90s alt-pop wouldn't have felt like the most obvious route [for the band] to take, and yet it works brilliantly" on Who Am I? Jay Singh, writing for The Line of Best Fit, criticised the band for "wearing their influences on their sleeve a little too blatantly" in an attempt to distance themselves from The 1975, with Singh arguing that "emulating Avril Lavigne isn't exactly a foolproof plan". However, he did applaud the band for their new sound which he described as "well executed and joyously expressive".

Writing for Pitchfork, Ashley Bardham awarded the album a 6.2/10. While arguing that the album still saw the band "stuck as an imitation act", she emphasised that "their love for [early 2000s pop-rock] certainly comes through." Bardham wrote that the album includes "some of the most pleasantly sugared Britpop since the 2010s-era Mumford & Sons invasion". While Who Am I? might have issues, Bardham concluded, the record sees the band's "star potential ... comes through". Eamonn Sweeney of The Irish Times gave the album three out of five stars, writing that "Pale Waves should secure another top-10 hit and cement their position as one of the few current guitar bands that resonate with a young, 21st-century audience". Rachel Brodsky of The Independent gave the album two out of five stars, saying that "despite the album's slick production and radio-ready melodies, one wishes Pale Waves could find a more sophisticated language to express youthful enlightenment". Rolling Stone magazine gave the album a negative review, writing, "These lovelorn English cliché jockeys offer a clunky mix of late-Nineties easy listening and 2000s emo pop." The magazine also negatively compared the band to Paramore and Natalie Imbruglia.

=== Accolades ===
Publication	Accolade	Rank	Ref.
Alternative Press	The 20 Most Underrated Pop-Punk Albums from the Last Two Decades	—N/a	
Gay Times	10 Best Albums by LGBTQ+ Artists of 2021 (So Far)	—N/a	
Dork	Albums of 2021	30	

== Commercial performance ==
Who Am I? was released 12 February 2021, and debuted at number 3 on the UK Albums Chart (Official Charts Company), selling 6,115 copies. On both the Official Vinyl Albums and the Official Physical Albums Charts (OOC), the album debuted at number 2, bested in both cases by Slowthai's album Tyron. Who Am I? did, however, top the UK Independent Album Chart (OOC), and by the end of 2021, Who Am I? was the twenty-ninth best-selling cassette release in the United Kingdom. On the Scottish Albums Chart, the album debuted at number 2, and in Ireland, the record debuted at 86. In Japan, Who Am I? peaked at 142 on Oricon's Japanese Albums chart, and at 88 on the Billboard Japan chart.

== Track listing ==
No.	Title	Writer(s)	Producer(s)	Length
1.	"Change"	Heather Baron-Gracie; Sam de Jong	Rich Costey; Sam de Jong	2:52
2.	"Fall to Pieces"	Baron-Gracie; de Jong	Costey	2:47
3.	"She's My Religion"	Baron-Gracie; de Jong	Costey	3:09
4.	"Easy"	Baron-Gracie; de Jong	Costey	2:54
5.	"Wish U Were Here"	Baron-Gracie; Suzanne Lyn Shinn	Costey	2:41
6.	"Tomorrow"	Baron-Gracie	Costey	2:37
7.	"You Don't Own Me"	Baron-Gracie; de Jong	Costey	3:16
8.	"I Just Needed You"	Baron-Gracie	Costey	3:06
9.	"Odd Ones Out"	Baron-Gracie; de Jong	Costey	3:01
10.	"Run To"	Baron-Gracie; Ciara Doran; Jake Sinclair; Shinn	Costey	2:45
11.	"Who Am I?"	Baron-Gracie; Doran	Costey	4:31
Total length:				33:39

Japan edition bonus track
No.	Title	Length
12.	"Tomorrow" (Demo)	1:55
Total length:		35:04

== Personnel ==
Credits adapted from the liner notes of Who Am I?

Pale Waves

- Heather Baron-Gracie – vocals, guitar
- Ciara Doran – drums, synths, programming
- Hugo Silvani – guitar
- Charlie Wood – bass guitar

Technical

- Rich Costey – production
- Sam de Jong – production (track 1)
- Koby Berman – additional production
- Ciara Doran – additional production (tracks 1, 4, and 11)

== Charts ==
Chart performance for Who Am I?
Chart (2021)	Peak position
Irish Albums (Official Charts)	86
Japan Hot Albums (Billboard Japan)	88
Japanese Albums (Oricon)	142
Scottish Albums (Official Charts)	2
UK Albums (Official Charts)	3
UK Independent Albums (Official Charts)	1

== Release history ==
Country	Date	Format	Variant	Label	Catalog no.	Ref.
Various	12 August 2022	CD	Standard	Dirty Hit	DH00989	
Various	12 August 2022	LP	Standard	Dirty Hit	DH00981	
Various	12 August 2022	cassette	Purple variant	Dirty Hit	DH00984	
Various	12 August 2022	cassette	Blue variant	Dirty Hit	DH00985	
Various	12 August 2022	cassette	Red variant	Dirty Hit	DH00986	
Various	12 August 2022	cassette	"Tour Edition" variant	Dirty Hit	DH00988	
Various	12 August 2022	digital download	—	Dirty Hit	—	
Various	12 August 2022	Streaming	—	Dirty Hit	—	
