= All the Things I Never Said =

All the Things I Never Said may refer to:

- All the Things I Never Said (Pale Waves EP)
- All the Things I Never Said (Tate McRae EP)
