= All the Things I Never Said (Pale Waves EP) =

EP by Pale Waves

EP by Pale Waves
- Released: 20 February 2018
- Recorded: 2017
- Genre: Indie pop
- Length: 14:00
- Label: Dirty Hit
- Producer: Jonathan Gilmore

Pale Waves chronology
All the Things I Never Said (2018)	My Mind Makes Noises (2018)

Singles from All the Things I Never Said
- 1. "New Year's Eve" Released: 7 November 2017; 2. "My Obsession" Released: 13 December 2017; 3. "The Tide" Released: 1 February 2018; 4. "Heavenly" Released: 23 March 2018

All the Things I Never Said is the debut extended play (EP) by English indie pop band Pale Waves. It was released on 20 February 2018 by the independent record label Dirty Hit. All the Things I Never Said includes reworked versions of two of the band's earliest songs, "The Tide" and "Heavenly", alongside new tracks, "New Year's Eve" and "My Obsession". Originally slated for a January release under the name New Year's Eve, the EP was instead issued on February 20 under its final name.

To promote the record, music videos were filmed for all four tracks, and each track was also released as a single, beginning with "New Year's Eve" on 7 November 2017. All the Things I Never Said was initially released digitally, with a vinyl edition being made available on 16 March. The record received largely positive reviews from critics and reached number one on both the UK Physical Singles Chart and the UK Vinyl Singles Chart.

== Production ==
=== Background and recording ===
In 2015, Pale Waves, then composed of just Heather Baron-Gracie and Ciara Doran, recorded demos for their songs "The Tide" and "Heavenly", which the band posted to SoundCloud and sold on CD-Rs via the internet. These demo tracks were produced prior to guitarist Hugo Silvani and bassist Charlie Wood joining the band, and upon their initial release, they caught the attention of XFM radio broadcaster John Kennedy. Kennedy in turn notified the independent label Dirty Hit, who subsequently signed the band onto their roster.

Around the time of the band's signing, Matty Healy of the 1975 took an interest in the group and helped them refine their sound by co-producing their first two singles, "There's a Honey" and "Television Romance". In late 2017, Pale Waves began working on their debut extended play (EP), All the Things I Never Said, which was recorded and produced by Jonathan Gilmore, a producer and mixer who had previously worked with the 1975.

=== Content ===
The EP opens with "New Year's Eve", a song whose lyrics explore, in part, the difficulty in establishing a rapport with not only a romantic partner but also with their friends and family. The song's music was written by Doran in 2016 on Christmas Day. Doran then sent the instrumental to Baron-Gracie, who responded that she wanted the lyrics to channel the emotions of a particularly "dramatic" New Year's Eve she had had in the past. When asked about the song, Baron-Gracie explained that "there is a big build up to that night". She continued: "There's so much expectation for something special [to happen on the holiday] so a lot of the time it goes wrong."

Both "The Tide" and "Heavenly" were written by the band in 2015. While Baron-Gracie and Doran would eventually go on to find both "a lot less personal" than their later songs, they decided to include re-recorded and slightly-rewritten versions of the songs on the EP. This was largely due to the prominent role the songs had played in the band's early success, as Baron-Gracie explained in an interview with Billboard magazine: "I like the fact that they are on the EP, because they were relevant at a time. They remind me of a time where I was like that, innocent, and the position I was in. ... A lot of people thought we'd pick them up and throw them away, but we didn't. We gave them back to [the fans]."

"My Obsession", described by Baron-Gracie as an emotionally "complex" track, was written to reflect the sadness of her grandfather in the aftermath of his wife's death. Musically, the song "features Pale Waves' signature elements of gloominess backtracked by an upbeat instrumental and a catchy chorus", according to Euphoria magazine. Despite being a song whose lyrics are awash in "grief and despair", Baron-Gracie has singled out "My Obsession" as her favourite song on the record – even if it "breaks [her] heart every time" the group performs it.

== Promotion and singles ==
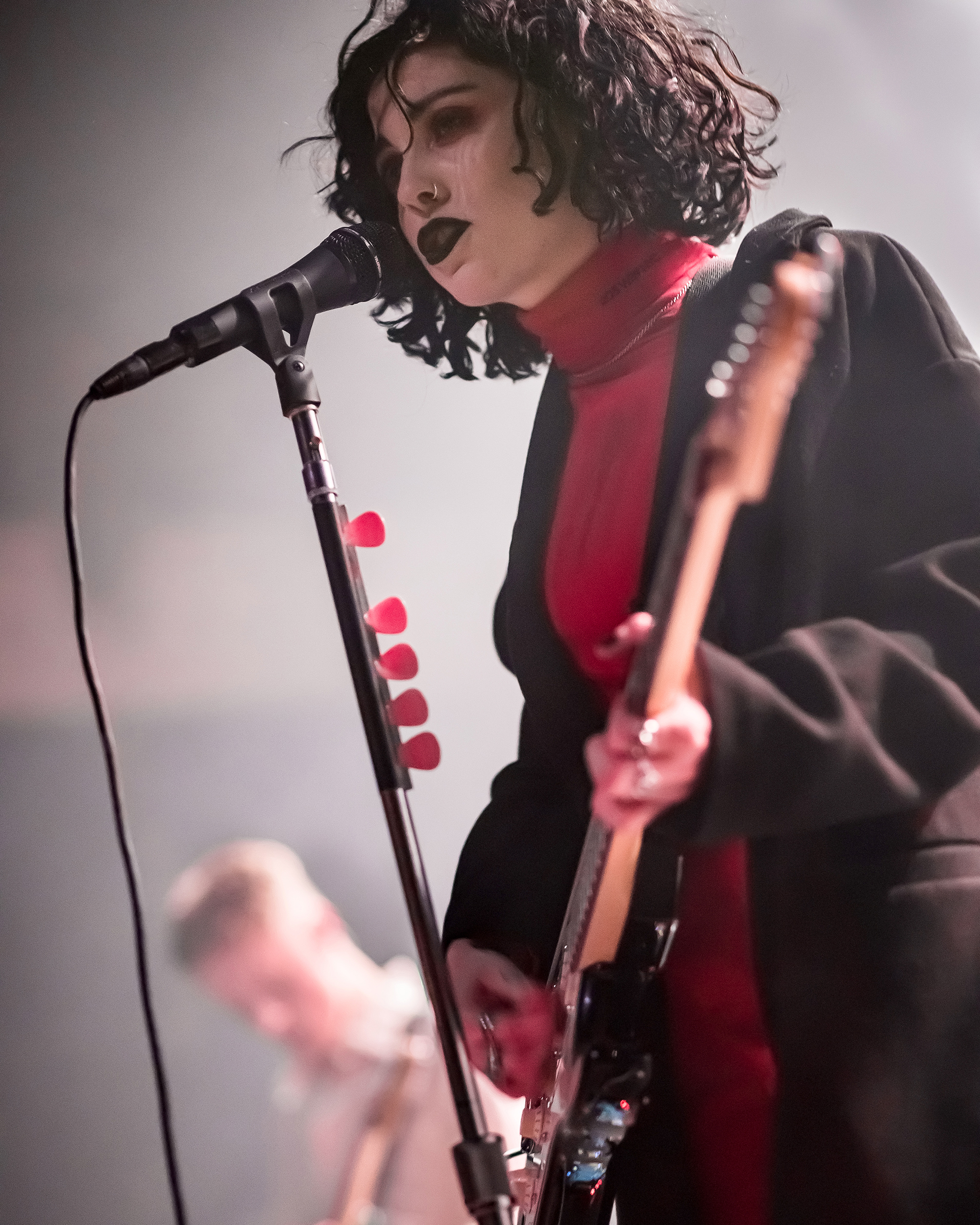
Heather Baron-Gracie, performing with Pale Waves at the Fonda Theatre in Los Angeles in late 2018.

The first single from the EP, "New Year's Eve", was released on November 7, 2017. A music video for the song, directed by Stephen Agnew, premiered on December 5, 2017. The video depicts the band at a New Year's Eve party where they are the only guests and performers. Although the band received multiple treatment proposals for the video, Agnew's stood out as the closest to their vision.

The second single, "My Obsession", debuted on Zane Lowe's Beats 1 show on December 12, 2017, before being released digitally the following day. A video for the single, also directed by Agnew, was released on December 18, 2017, having been filmed alongside "New Year's Eve" over a two-day period. The video portrays Baron-Gracie living with a mannequin, treating it as the object of her love. In an interview with The Fader, Baron-Gracie explained, "I wanted to create an uncomfortable, voyeuristic experience for the viewer, making them feel as if they were intruding on a world they shouldn't be a part of. Ultimately, it represents desperation, loneliness, and grief."

On January 31, 2018, "The Tide" premiered on Lowe's Beats 1 show as part of his "World Record" feature, with the song's digital release occurring the next day. The music video, directed by Andy Deluca, premiered on February 7, 2018. It combines live performance footage with behind-the-scenes footage shot during the band’s headlining North American tour in November and December 2017.

The EP's final single, "Heavenly", premiered on BBC Radio 1's Annie Mac show on February 19, 2018. The music video, released on March 19, 2018, was directed by Adam Powell. It features Baron-Gracie in a latex catsuit, suspended by wires that manipulate her movements. These scenes are intercut with close-up shots of her singing against a stark white backdrop. The video had its world premiere on Wonderland's website.

== Critical reception ==
Professional ratings
Review scores
Source	Rating
The Line of Best Fit	8/10
NME	4/5 stars

Critical reception to the EP was largely positive. Thomas Smith of NME praised the release as "a vivid 15-minute scrapbook of [the band's] journey thus far." Smith further argued that the release saw the band venture into bold new territory and that its tracks were emotionally impactful. Dave Beech of The Line of Best Fit awarded the album an eight out of ten, describing the EP as "four tracks of effortless indie-pop; its silky-smooth pop licks and sugar sweet vocal delivery masking a darkness that seems inherent to Pale Waves' genetic make-up." While acknowledging that some might find the pop elements too prominent, Beech emphasized his belief that the band's music was demonstrably fun.

Reception to the singles was largely positive. Writing for Clash magazine, reviewer Robin Murray called "New Year's Eve" an "engagingly bittersweet" song with a chorus that could have been "lifted straight from the end credits of a John Hughes movie", DIY magazine called the song a "shimmering pop gem with a melancholy twist". In a review of "My Obsession", Murray of Clash wrote that the track was contemplative, honest, and "gently anthemic". DIY echoed this sentiment, calling "My Obsession" a "goth-pop sensation" with a powerful riff, memorable guitar melodies, and a catchy pop hook. Platform magazine described "The Tide" as a "feel-good ... dreamy, 80s inspired track", and The Line of Best Fit's Laurence Day wrote that "Heavenly" is a "charming" track, whose "euphoric chorus" could serve "to soundtrack memories of misspent youth ... and classic coming-of-age movies from decades past".

== Commercial performance ==
Initially slated to be released on 18 January 2018 under the title New Year's Eve, All the Things I Never Said was officially released on 20 February 2018 by Dirty Hit. The initial release was digital download-only, but on 16 March 2018, a vinyl version of the record was also released. Upon its release, the EP reached number one on both the UK Physical Singles Chart and the UK Vinyl Singles Chart. The record also peaked at number 31 on the 2018 UK Vinyl Singles Top 40 year-end chart.

== Track listing ==
All the Things I Never Said track listing
No.	Title	Writer(s)	Producer(s)	Length
1.	"New Year's Eve"	Heather Baron-Gracie; Ciara Doran	Jonathan Gilmore	3:27
2.	"The Tide"	Baron-Gracie; Doran	Gilmore	3:14
3.	"My Obsession"	Baron-Gracie; Doran	Gilmore	4:25
4.	"Heavenly"	Baron-Gracie; Doran	Gilmore	2:54
Total length:				14:00

== Personnel ==
Pale Waves

- Heather Baron-Gracie – lead vocals, rhythm guitar
- Ciara Doran – drums
- Hugo Silvani – lead guitar, keyboard
- Charlie Wood – bass guitar, keyboard

Technical personnel

- Samuel Burgess-Johnson – art direction
- Jon Gilmore – production

== Charts ==
=== Weekly charts ===
Chart (2018)	Peak position
UK Physical Singles (Official Charts Company)	1
UK Vinyl Singles (Official Charts Company)	1

=== Year-end charts ===
Chart (2018)	Position
UK Vinyl Singles Top 40 (OCC)	31

== Release history ==
Country	Date	Format	Label	Catalog no.	Ref.
Various	14 September 2018	Digital download	Dirty Hit	—N/a	
United Kingdom	16 March 2018	12" vinyl	Dirty Hit	DH00288	
