= Pale Waves =

English rock band

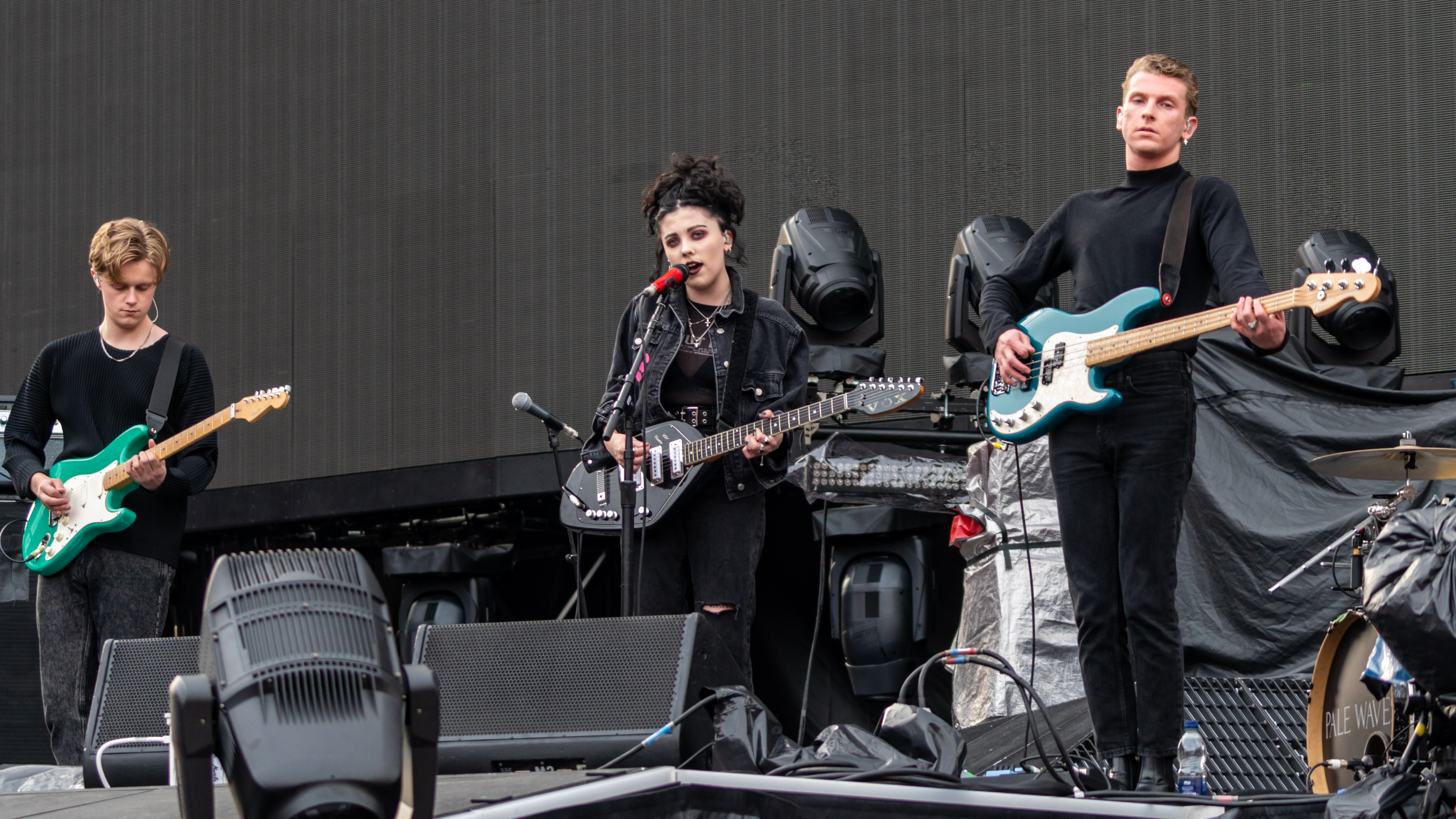
- Pale Waves performing in June 2019

Background information
- Origin: Manchester, England
- Genres: Indie pop; indie rock; synth-pop; pop rock
- Years active: 2014–present
- Labels: Dirty Hit; Interscope; Tenace Records
- Members: Heather Baron-Gracie; Ciara Doran; Charlie Wood
- Past members: Ben Bateman; Ryan Marsden; Hugo Silvani
- Website: palewaves.co.uk

Pale Waves are an English rock band from Manchester, formed in 2014. Lead singer and guitarist Heather Baron-Gracie met drummer Ciara Doran while attending university in Manchester and they formed a band. Guitarist Hugo Silvani and bassist Charlie Wood soon joined and completed the lineup. The band's early work is often described as 80s-inspired indie rock or synth-pop; their second and third albums, however, owe more to the pop-punk genre.

After signing a record deal with Dirty Hit in 2017, Pale Waves released their debut single, "There's a Honey", followed by "Television Romance". In 2018, the band were ranked fifth in the BBC Sound of 2018 poll and won the NME Under the Radar Award at the NME Awards. Pale Waves' debut EP, All the Things I Never Said, was released in February 2018, followed by their albums, My Mind Makes Noises, (2018), Who Am I? (2021), Unwanted (2022), and Smitten (2024).

== History ==
=== 2014–2017: Formation and early career ===
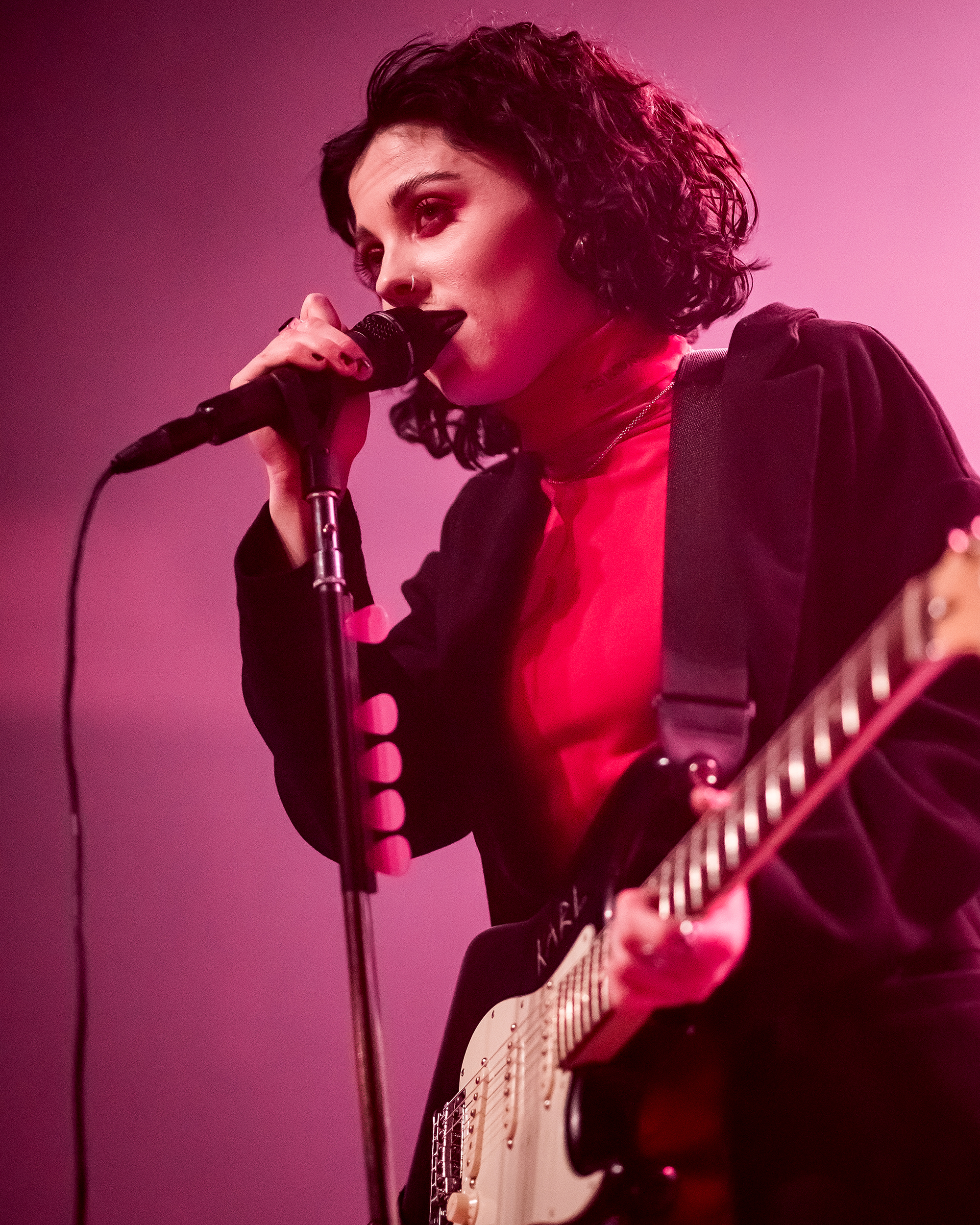
Pale Waves are fronted by singer-guitarist Heather Baron-Gracie.

Pale Waves formed in 2014 when drummer Ciara Doran met Heather Baron-Gracie while attending BIMM Manchester. The two originally named their group Creek, but they soon changed it to Pale Waves, basing the name on a painting Baron-Gracie's grandmother had created. Doran and Baron-Gracie initially enlisted second guitarist Ben Bateman and bassist Ryan Marsden to complete the lineup. Later that year both members were asked to leave and departed from the band shortly thereafter, with current bassist Charlie Wood and second guitarist Hugo Silvani replacing them. The band recorded early demos with production team Sugar House that were released in 2015. These tracks caught the attention of XFM radio broadcaster John Kennedy, who referred them to the independent record label Dirty Hit. Pale Waves was subsequently signed to the label in 2017.

The band's first single under Dirty Hit, "There's a Honey", was released on 21 April 2017 to widespread acclaim. On 1 June 2017, the band played a sold-out show at Madison Square Garden supporting the 1975 on their North American tour. The band's second single, "Television Romance", was released on 16 August 2017, with its music video directed by The 1975 lead singer Matty Healy. Healy later appeared on the cover of NME with Baron-Gracie for the 20 October 2017 issue of the magazine. Pale Waves embarked on their first North American headlining tour in November and December 2017, playing 21 shows over four weeks.

The band headlined DIY magazine's Class of 2018 shortlist for its December/January issue. On 7 November 2017, the band released the single "New Year's Eve", followed by "My Obsession" on 13 December 2017.

=== 2018–2019: All the Things I Never Said and My Mind Makes Noises ===
Baron-Gracie announced on 4 January 2018 via Twitter that the band had started recording their debut album. On 8 January, it was announced that the band had been placed fifth in the BBC Sound of 2018 poll. Speaking to the BBC, Baron-Gracie talked about how the band's debut album is shaping up and its darker tone: "The songs we have out now are very influenced by romance. The album is me talking about a lot of my darker issues. I talk about a lot of things that go on in my mind rather than in my heart". "The Tide", the first song written by the band, was released on 1 February 2018 as the third single from the band's then-upcoming debut extended play (EP), All the Things I Never Said.

Pale Waves won the NME Under the Radar Award at the NME Awards 2018, and performed "There's a Honey" at the ceremony at London's O_{2} Academy Brixton on 14 February 2018. The band also received a nomination for Best Video for "Television Romance", but lost out to The Big Moon.

Pale Waves' debut EP, All the Things I Never Said, was released digitally on 20 February 2018, followed by a 12-inch vinyl release on 16 March 2018. On 6 April 2018, it was announced that the band had signed to Interscope Records in a joint venture with Dirty Hit to release music in the United States. The third single from the band's debut album, "Kiss", following "There's a Honey" and "Television Romance", was released on 15 May 2018. "Noises" was released as the fourth single on 28 June 2018.

In an interview with NME magazine in early September 2018 the band revealed they are working on a new EP following the debut album. Baron-Gracie discussed how the new EP will lean towards "pop punk and rock'n'roll" and will touch on themes such as politics, acceptance and sexuality. The band's debut album, My Mind Makes Noises, was released on 14 September 2018 and reached number eight on the UK Albums Chart.

=== 2019–2022: Who Am I? ===
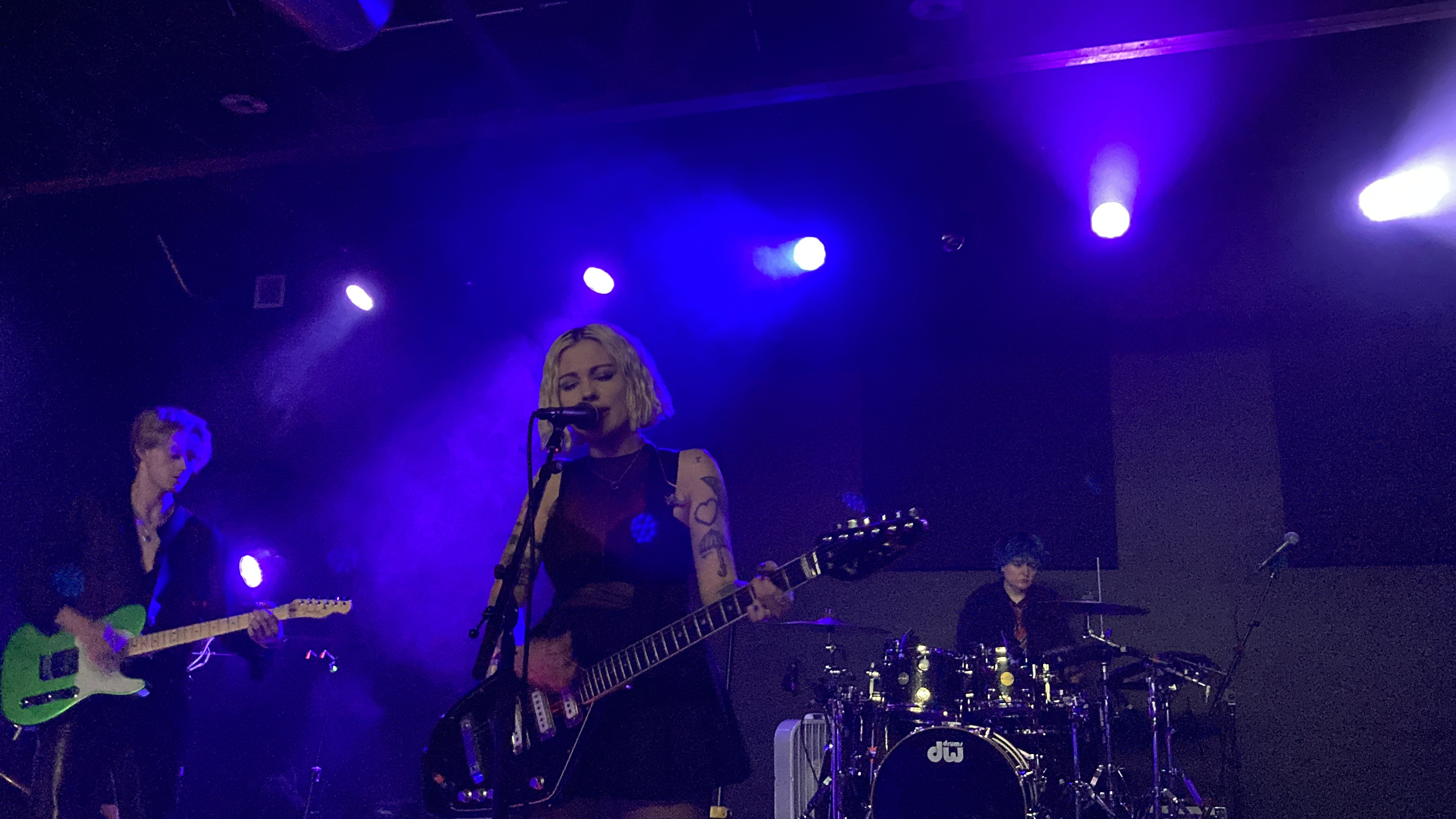
Pale Waves performing in June 2022

Speaking to NME while at Radio 1's Big Weekend in May 2019, Baron-Gracie updated on the progress of the EP, saying the band "[had] so many songs" and that they would cut the amount to "five or six tracks" with the remainder that "will probably go on the album". However, in September 2019 the band reported they will no longer be doing an EP, rather "diving deep into the second album". On 17 October 2019 the band won the Q Best Breakthrough Act at the Q Awards 2019.

In January 2020 Pale Waves released the song "SkinDeepSkyHighHeartWide" in collaboration with Lawrence Rothman for The Turning official motion picture soundtrack. A few months later, in March 2020, the band were involved in a road accident on their way to support Halsey in Berlin. The group's tour bus rolled off the road, leaving them trapped in the bus. Minor injuries were sustained in the accident and the tour bus burnt out. Ciara Doran on Instagram described the incident, "We honestly thought we were going to die. The injuries will heal but this will stay with me and everyone involved for forever."

The band's second album, Who Am I?, was announced on 10 November 2020 along with its lead single "Change", which was named as Annie Mac's Hottest Record in the World. Baron-Gracie and Doran, both of whom are members of the LGBTQ+ community, aimed for the album to be "a voice for LGBTQ+ people". The album was partially recorded in Los Angeles with Rich Costey though COVID-19 restrictions forced the band to return to the U.K. and finish the remainder of the album remotely. Of making an album during the pandemic, Baron-Gracie confessed that "for me, music and art is for people not to feel so alone and isolated. I want to be that person my fans look up to and find comfort in." Who Am I? was released on 12 February 2021 and reached number 3 on UK Albums Chart.

=== 2022–2024: Unwanted ===
The band's third studio album, Unwanted, was released on 12 August 2022. It was supported by singles "Lies", "Reasons to Live", "Jealousy", "The Hard Way", and "Clean", all of which were released during the spring and summer months of 2022. Taking heavy inspiration from the likes of Paramore, Courtney Love, and Liz Phair, the album was a pivot into pop-punk, deviating further from their indie-pop and dream-pop roots.

The following month, in September 2022, Pale Waves went on to perform shows in North America, and were set to complete touring on October 7; however, on September 20, the remaining dates in the United States were canceled due to safety concerns over their tour bus. In November, the band played various shows in the United Kingdom and Japan.

=== 2024–present: Smitten ===
In June 2024, the band announced that its fourth studio album, Smitten, would be released on 27 September 2024. The album was preceded by the singles "Perfume", "Glasgow", "Gravity", and "Thinking About You".

In January 2026, it was announced that Pale Waves had signed a record and distribution deal with Tenace Records (a joint venture supported by the Believe UK music group and Tileyard Music). Roughly a month later, on February 25, the band released a statement via Instagram that guitarist Hugo Silvani had left the group.

== Musical style ==
Pale Waves have been described as indie pop, indie rock, synth-pop, goth-pop, pop-punk, pop rock, dream pop, and pop. The band have cited artists such as The Blue Nile, Prince, The Cranberries, Cocteau Twins, The 1975, Alanis Morissette and Avril Lavigne as influences. Baron-Gracie has stated, "I love a lot of '80s artists like Prince and Madonna. 'Purple Rain' is one of my favorite songs of all time. But I love The Cure. I love songs that give you melodies that you can sing at any time, but within those melodies, there are things that break your heart." In an interview with The Irish Times, Baron-Gracie cited Dolores O'Riordan as her main vocal influence, saying: "I love The Cranberries. They were amazing. I definitely looked up to Dolores O’Riordan. She has one of my favourite voices of all time. She gave off that attitude – she was totally herself. I loved her fashion sense, she was such a cool person".

For their second album, Who Am I?, Baron-Gracie cited country artists The Chicks and Kacey Musgraves as influences, particularly on "the melodic side of [the] record." Their third album, Unwanted, was inspired by female rock artists Courtney Love and Liz Phair, and pop-punk band Paramore.

== Band members ==
Current

- Heather Baron-Gracie – lead vocals, rhythm guitar, keyboards (2014–present), lead guitar (2026–present)
- Ciara Doran – drums, keyboards, synthesizers, programming (2014–present)
- Charlie Wood – bass, keyboards (2015–present)

Former

- Ben Bateman – lead guitar (2014–2015)
- Ryan Marsden – bass (2014–2015)
- Hugo Silvani – lead guitar, keyboards (2015–2026)

Timeline

== Discography ==
=== Studio albums ===
Title	Details	Peak chart positions								Sales
Title	Details	UK	UK Indie	IRE	JPN	JPN Hot	SCO	US Heat	US Sales	Sales
My Mind Makes Noises	Released: 14 September 2018; Label: Dirty Hit, Interscope; Formats: CD, LP, cassette, digital download, streaming	8	1	61	52	63	8	1	39	UK: 7,110; US: 3,000
Who Am I?	Released: 12 February 2021; Label: Dirty Hit; Formats: CD, LP, cassette, digital download, streaming	3	1	86	142	88	2	—	—	UK: 6,115
Unwanted	Released: 12 August 2022; Label: Dirty Hit; Formats: CD, LP, cassette, digital download, streaming	4	1	—	166	(Note: The album did not enter the Billboard Japan "Hot Albums" chart, but it did peak at number 86 on the "Download Albums" chart.)	2	—	—	UK: 6,985
Smitten	Released: 27 September 2024; Label: Dirty Hit; Formats: CD, LP, cassette, digital download, streaming	13	3	—	—	(Note: The album did not enter the Billboard Japan "Hot Albums" chart, but it did peak at number 83 on the "Download Albums" chart.)	4	—	—	

=== Extended plays ===
Title	Details	Peak chart positions	
Title	Details	UK Phys	UK Vinyl
All the Things I Never Said	Digital release: 20 February 2018; Vinyl release: 16 March 2018; Label: Dirty Hit; Formats: Digital download, 12-inch vinyl	1	1
Deezer Sessions	Released: 18 January 2019; Label: Dirty Hit; Formats: Digital download	—	—
Apple Music Home Session	Released: 16 April 2021; Label: Dirty Hit; Formats: Digital download	—	—
Live from Metropolis Studios	Released: 2 December 2024; Label: Dirty Hit; Formats: 12-inch vinyl	—	—

=== Singles ===
Title	Year	Peak chart positions								Album
Title	Year	UK Phys	UK Vinyl	UK Air.	BEL (FL)	BEL (WA)	JPN	JPN Over.	SCO	Album
"Television Romance" / "There's a Honey" (Note: "Television Romance"/"There's a Honey" was re-released as a double A-side seven-inch vinyl single on 10 November 2017, reaching number two on both the UK Vinyl Singles Chart and the UK Physical Singles Chart.)	2017	2	2	—	—	—	—	—	83	My Mind Makes Noises
"New Year's Eve" (Note: After charting as an EP, All the Things I Never Said charted on the Scottish Singles Chart (OCC), the Official Physical Singles Chart (OCC), and the Official Vinyl Singles Chart (OCC) as a single under the name of its opening track, "New Year's Eve" (the name which the EP was initially slated to be released as).)	2017	3	3	—	—	—	—	—	33	All the Things I Never Said
"My Obsession"	2017	—	—	—	—	—	—	—	—	All the Things I Never Said
"The Tide"	2018	—	—	—	—	—	—	—	—	All the Things I Never Said
"Heavenly"	2018	—	—	—	—	—	—	—	—	All the Things I Never Said
"Kiss"	2018	—	—	—	— (Note: "Kiss" did not enter the Flanders Ultratop 50, but peaked at number 34 on the Ultratip chart.)	— (Note: "Kiss" did not enter the Wallonia Ultratop 50, but entered the Ultratop "Extra Tips".)	—	—	—	My Mind Makes Noises
"Noises"	2018	—	—	—	—	—	—	—	—	My Mind Makes Noises
"Eighteen"	2018	—	—	46	—	—	55	2	—	My Mind Makes Noises
"Black"	2018	—	—	—	—	—	—	—	—	My Mind Makes Noises
"One More Time"	2018	—	—	—	—	—	—	—	—	My Mind Makes Noises
"Change"	2020	—	—	—	—	—	—	—	—	Who Am I?
"She's My Religion"	2020	—	—	—	—	—	—	—	×	Who Am I?
"Easy"	2021	—	—	43	—	—	—	—	×	Who Am I?
"You Don't Own Me"	2021	—	—	—	—	—	—	—	×	Who Am I?
"Fall to Pieces"	2021	—	—	—	—	—	—	—	×	Who Am I?
"Lies"	2022	—	—	—	—	—	—	—	×	Unwanted
"Reasons to Live"	2022	—	—	—	—	—	—	—	×	Unwanted
"Jealousy"	2022	—	—	—	—	—	—	—	×	Unwanted
"The Hard Way"	2022	—	—	—	—	—	—	—	×	Unwanted
"Clean"	2022	—	—	—	—	—	—	—	×	Unwanted
"Perfume"	2024	17	12	—	—	—	—	13	×	Smitten
"Glasgow"	2024	—	—	—	—	—	—	—	×	Smitten
"Gravity"	2024	—	—	—	—	—	—	—	×	Smitten
"Thinking About You"	2024	—	—	—	—	—	—	—	×	Smitten
"Kiss Me Again"	2024	—	—	—	—	—	—	—	×	Smitten
"Zombie"	2025	—	—	—	—	—	—	—	×	
"—" denotes a recording that did not chart or was not released in that territory. "×" denotes periods where charts did not exist or were not archived.

==== As featured artist ====
Song	Year	Peak chart positions					Album
Song	Year	UK Down	UK Sales	US Alt	US Alt Digi.	CZE	Album
"SkinDeepSkyHighHeartWide" (Lawrence Rothman featuring Pale Waves)	2020	—	—	—	—	—	The Turning: Original Motion Picture Soundtrack
"SkinDeepSkyHighHeartWide" (Asmara Remix) (Lawrence Rothman and Nguzunguzu featuring Pale Waves)	2020	—	—	—	—	—	KRO Remixes Vol. 1
"PMA" (All Time Low featuring Pale Waves)	2021	77	78	—	22	—	Non-album singles
"Unlovable" (Beach Weather featuring Pale Waves)	2023	—	—	11	—	7	Non-album singles
"She's So Cool" (Bruses featuring Pale Waves)	2023	—	—	—	—	—	Non-album singles

=== Promotional singles ===
Title	Year	For
"One More Time" (Re-recording)	2018	Spotify Singles
"22" (Taylor Swift cover)	2018	Spotify Singles
"Last Christmas" (Wham! cover)	2018	Spotify Singles
"Faith" (George Michael cover)	2021	George Michael Covered

== Music videos ==
Title	Year	Director
"There's a Honey"	2017	Silent Tapes
"Television Romance"	2017	Samuel Burgess-Johnson and Matty Healy
"New Year's Eve"	2017	Stephen Agnew
"My Obsession"	2017	Stephen Agnew
"The Tide"	2018	Andy Deluca
"Heavenly"	2018	Adam Powell
"Kiss"	2018	Robert Hales
"Noises"	2018	Gareth Phillips
"Eighteen"	2018	Adam Powell
"One More Time"	2018	Sophia + Robert
"Change"	2020	Johnny Goddard
"She's My Religion"	2020	Jess Kohl
"Easy"	2021	James Slater
"You Don't Own Me"	2021	Heather Baron-Gracie and Kelsi Luck
"Fall To Pieces"	2021	Callum Lloyd-James
"Lies"	2022	Vasilisa Forbes
"Jealousy"	2022	Vasilisa Forbes
"Reasons to Live"	2022	Kelsi Luck
"Clean"	2022	Vasilisa Forbes
"Unwanted"	2022	Pale Waves
"Perfume"	2024	Georgie Cowan-Turner
"Glasgow"	2024	Heather Baron-Gracie
"Gravity"	2024	Georgie Cowan-Turner
"Thinking About You"	2024	Kelsi Luck

== Awards and nominations ==
Year	Organisation	Award	Work	Result	Ref.
2017	Vevo	dscvr Artists to Watch 2018	Pale Waves	Included	
2017	DIY	Class of 2018	Pale Waves	First	
2018	Alternative Press	18 Artists to Watch in 2018	Pale Waves	Included	
2018	Clash	18 for '18	Pale Waves	Included	
2018	BBC	Sound of 2018	Pale Waves	Fifth	
2018	MTV UK	MTV Brand New 2018	Pale Waves	Nominated	
2018	NME	The NME 100	Pale Waves	Included	
2018	NME Awards	Best Video	"Television Romance"	Nominated	
2018	NME Awards	NME Under the Radar	Pale Waves	Won	
2019	Q Awards	Q Best Breakthrough Act	Pale Waves	Won	
2021	Popjustice £20 Music Prize	Best British Pop Single	"She's My Religion"	Nominated	
2024	British LGBT Awards	Music Artist	Pale Waves	Nominated	
2025	Music Week Awards	Music & Brand Partnership	Jack Daniel’s Presents Live To Vinyl	Pending	
