= Pride Magazine =

UK magazine

Pride
- May 2011 issue featuring Janelle Monáe
- Former editors: Sherry Dixon, Afua Adom, Shevelle Rhule, Mary Bello and Sue Omar
- Categories: Lifestyle magazine
- Frequency: Monthly
- Publisher: Pride Media
- Founded: 1991; 35 years ago
- Country: UK
- Based in: London, England
- Language: English
- Website: pridemagazine.com

Pride Magazine (styled in covers as PRIDE) is a magazine that focuses on black women in the United Kingdom. It has been on publication since 1991.

The magazine has a circulation of more than 30,000 copies per month. In 2012, the magazine celebrated its 21st year as the market leader. The Guardian newspaper stated back in 2007 that "Pride Magazine has dominated its market for over 15 years."

The magazine switched its format in 2011 as it turned 20 to the popular Glamour-sized format.

Covers include Naomi Campbell, Kelis, Rihanna, Nicole Scherzinger and Janelle Monáe.

Former notable editors include Sherry Dixon, Afua Adom, Shevelle Rhule, Mary Bello and Sue Omar.
