= Heather Baron-Gracie =

English singer and musician (born 1995)

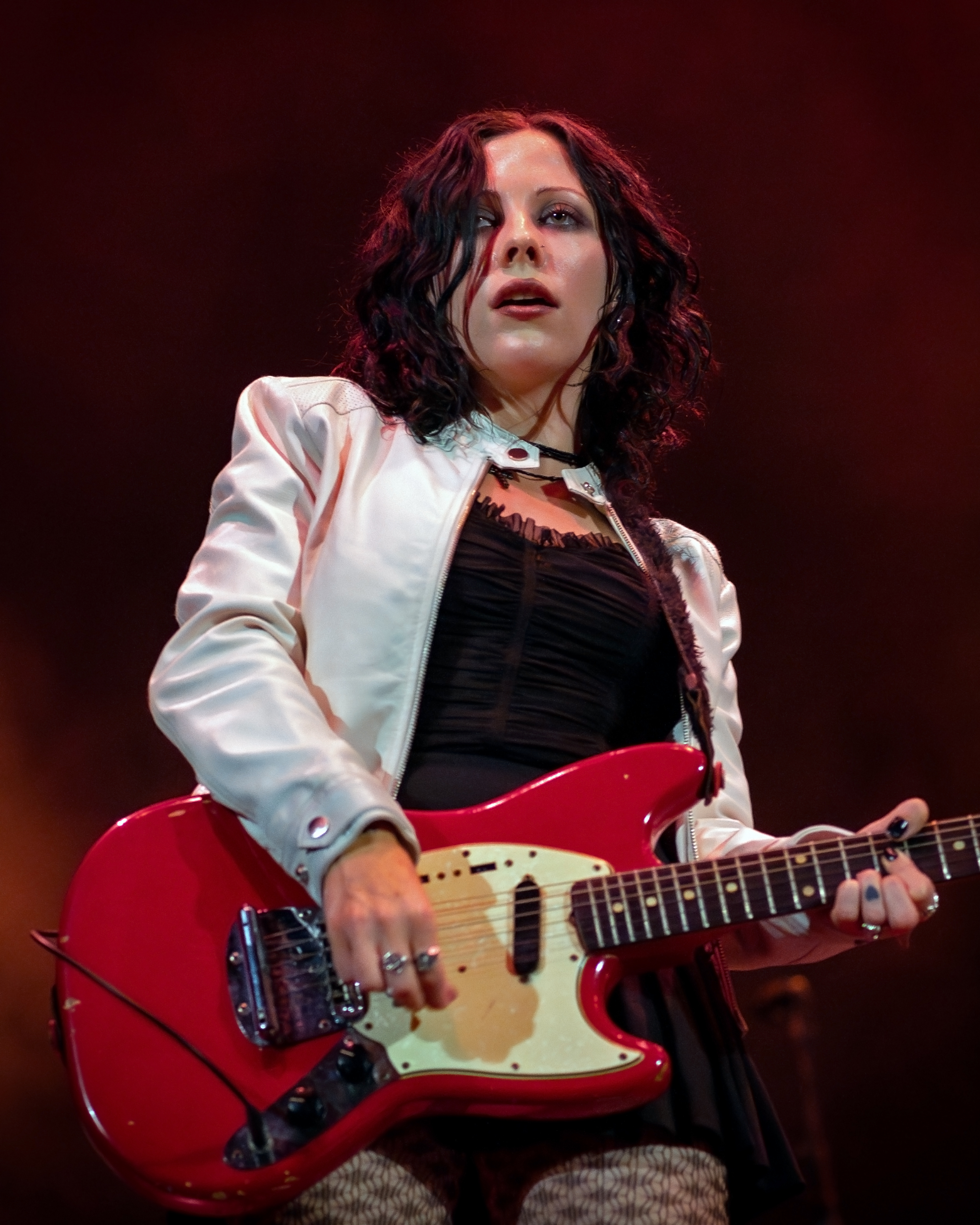
- Heather Baron-Gracie in 2024

Background information
- Born: 17 January 1995 (age 31); Preston, Lancashire, England
- Genres: Indie rock; indie pop; synth-pop; pop-punk; pop rock; dream pop
- Occupations: Singer; songwriter; musician
- Years active: 2014–present
- Member of: Pale Waves
- Partner: Kelsi Luck

Heather Baron-Gracie (born 17 January 1995) is a British singer, songwriter, and musician, best known as the guitarist and vocalist for the indie rock band Pale Waves.

== Life and career ==
=== Early life ===
Heather Baron-Gracie was born in Preston, Lancashire. Around the time she started secondary school, Baron-Gracie experienced a debilitating back injury: "I didn't have an accident. It just happened," she told the Evening Standard in 2018. "I was complaining for ages that my back was in pain but people just thought I was just growing. I was doing sports with a broken back for ages." The injury – which was severe enough that Baron-Gracie required spinal fusion surgery – very nearly paralysed her, and it forced her to miss an entire year of school. It was during her recovery that Baron-Gracie got deeply invested in music: "I was always into [music] ... But when that happened, I was staying in my house and wrote music loads. And ever since that, this is what I want to do."

Baron-Gracie attended the British and Irish Modern Music Institute (BIMM) in Manchester, where she met future Pale Waves drummer Ciara Doran. The two connected via a college-sponsored Facebook group and, thanks to their similar aesthetic and personality, they quickly befriended one another.

=== Pale Waves ===
Originally known as "Creek", the band Pale Waves was founded by Baron-Gracie and Doran in 2014. The band later expanded to include Hugo Silvani and Charlie Wood. Pale Waves is signed to the independent label Dirty Hit and has released an EP, All the Things I Never Said (2018), and three albums, My Mind Makes Noises (2018), Who Am I? (2021), and Unwanted (2022). A fourth album, Smitten, was released on 20 September 2024.

== Artistry ==
=== Influences ===
Much of the music Heather Baron-Gracie has written has been inspired by musicians from the 1980s, including The Cure, Prince, and Madonna. When discussing Pale Waves's second album Who Am I?, Baron-Gracie further cited Avril Lavigne, Alanis Morissette, Courtney Love, Liz Phair, Michelle Branch, The Chicks, and Kacey Musgraves as inspiration. In terms of specific albums, Baron-Gracie has also cited The Cure's Disintegration (1989), Paramore's All We know Is Falling (2005) and Riot! (2007), Lucy Rose's Like I Used To (2012), Daughter's If You Leave (2013), and Muna's About U (2017) as inspiring both her and Pale Waves's musical style.

In an interview with The Irish Times, Baron-Gracie cited Dolores O'Riordan as her main vocal influence, saying: "I love The Cranberries. They were amazing. I definitely looked up to Dolores O'Riordan. She has one of my favourite voices of all time. She gave off that attitude – she was totally herself. I loved her fashion sense, she was such a cool person".

=== Musical equipment ===
Baron-Gracie is known for playing Vox Phantoms. She received her first of these guitars as a birthday present from Matty Healy of the 1975. However, due to the guitar's size, Baron-Gracie struggled to play it during live shows, telling Magnet magazine: "It sounded amazing, it played amazing, but it was a 12-string, and it was difficult to play live. I'm a tiny person and this guitar was just as big as me. It kept falling down." Jaime Oborne, the head of the record label Dirty Hit, subsequently reached out to a guitar enthusiast that he knew. This individual built Baron-Gracie a custom black Vox Phantom six-string that she could use during live performances.

=== Visual style ===
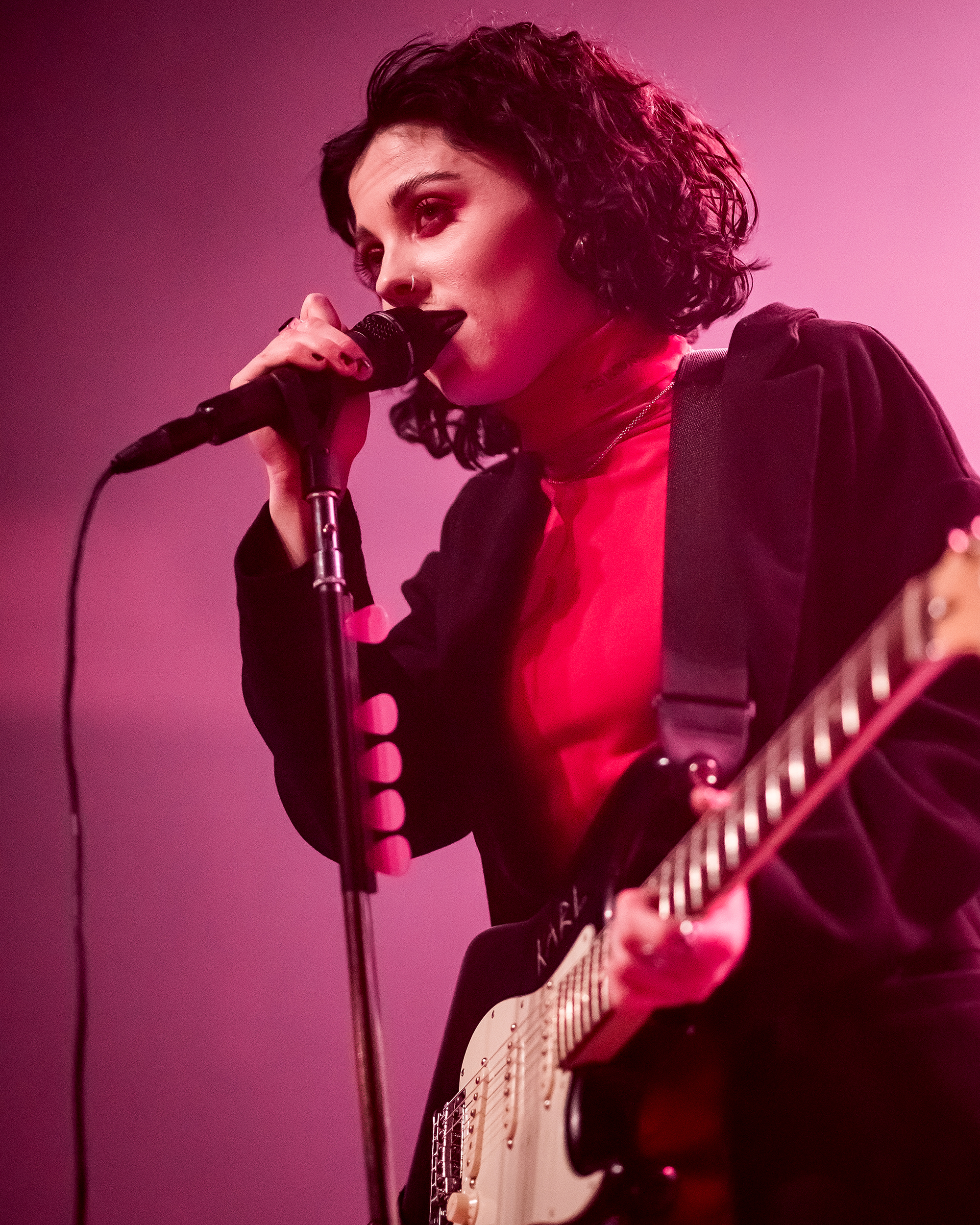
Heather Baron-Gracie, performing with Pale Waves in 2018

Baron-Gracie's visual aesthetic and fashion sense has often been described as "gothic". In an interview with the Evening Standard, Baron-Gracie explained: "I've always been into dark fashion, the gothic side of things and vampires ... I like funeral clothes more than summer clothes. It comes from feeling like an outsider." The juxtaposition between Pale Waves's "high-fidelity pop exuberance" and Baron-Gracie's "obsidian gothic aesthetics" has engendered critical discussion: Owen Tanner of the Milwaukee Record described her look as "Taylor Swift going as Beetlejuice for Halloween" and Jessie Atkinson of Gigwise called it "Avril Lavigne Gothicism".

Baron-Gracie's aesthetic has often led many to assume she performs in a metal, metalcore, or screamo band—an assumption that Baron-Gracie has deemed "one of the biggest misconceptions" about Pale Waves. The contrast between Baron-Gracie's visual style and the style of her band has occasionally resulted in accusations of "goth-baiting"—"on the first album," she told Nylon, "we received so much shit for basically ... wearing eye shadow and then playing essentially like pop music"—but Baron-Gracie has rebuffed these criticisms many times: In the aforementioned Nylon interview, she emphasized, "I don't have to wear anything to play the kind of music that I want to play", and in an interview with Magnet, Baron-Gracie further stressed, "If I want to look like a moody vampire, let me!"

== Personal life ==
Baron-Gracie is an open member of the LGBTQ+ community, and in an interview with Vanity Fair, she exclaimed: "Too many people think I'm straight ... I'm not straight ... I've always been gay. When I came out of the womb I knew I was gay." Baron-Gracie is in a relationship with singer and songwriter Kelsi Luck, who served as Baron-Gracie's "muse" when she was writing the lyrics and themes for the Pale Waves album Who Am I? With Baron-Gracie, Luck co-directed the video for Pale Waves' single "You Don't Own Me", and the two starred together in the video for the song "She's My Religion".

In an interview with Ladygunn magazine, Baron-Gracie said that she is "not really religious"; in a later Line of Best Fit interview, however, she did note that she has "become a lot more spiritual" as she has gotten older. Part of this shift was the result of Baron-Gracie having read the work of Alain de Botton. When discussing the use of religious visuals in the music video for "She's My Religion," she explained that the aesthetic was "basically a rebellion against religious and even non-religious people who disregard same-sex relationships".
