= Sam de Jong =

US-based producer and songwriter (born 1989)

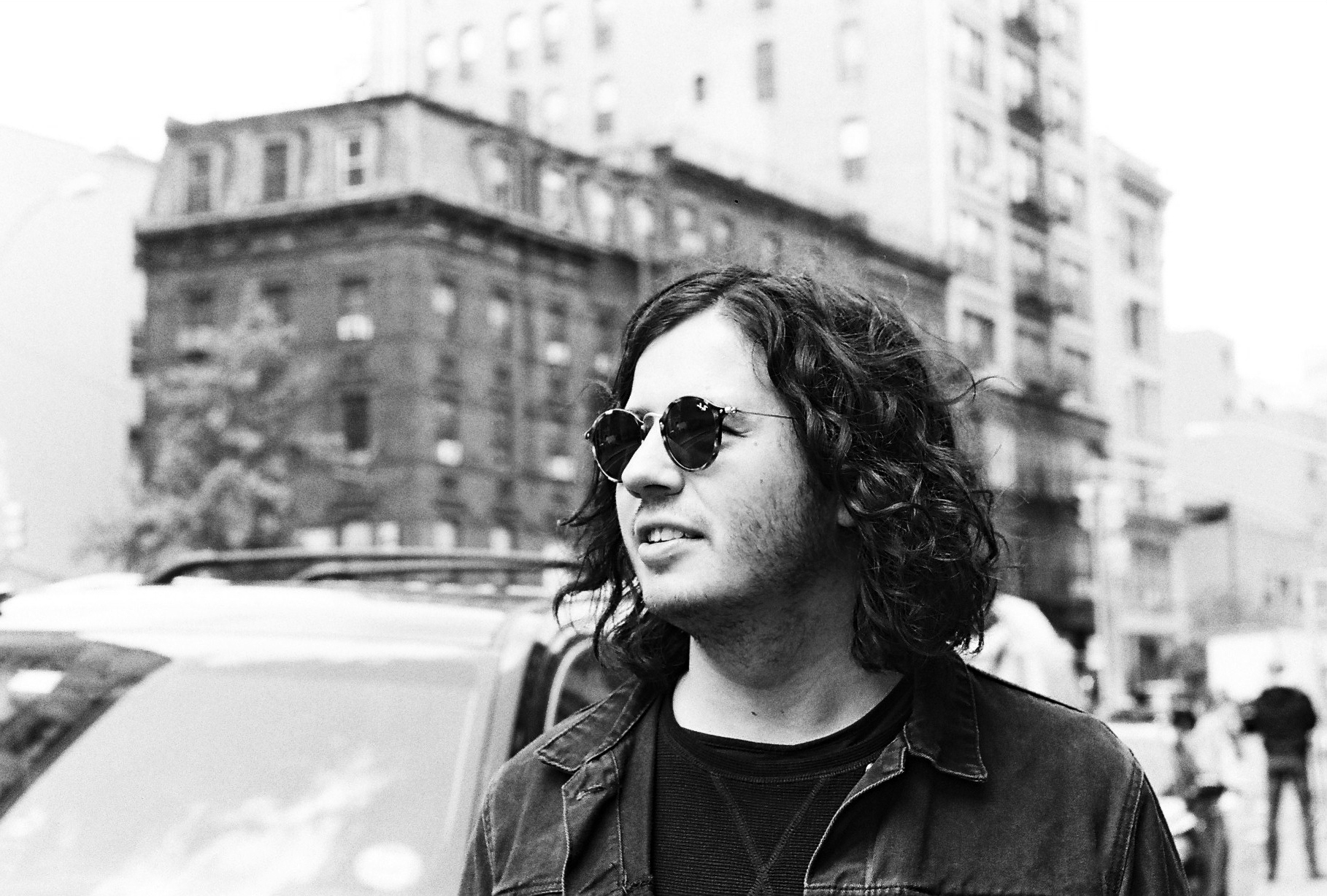

Background information
- Born: 20 March 1989 (age 37)
- Origin: Auckland, New Zealand
- Occupations: Record producer; songwriter; musician
- Label: Sony Music Publishing

Sam de Jong (born 20 March 1989) is a Los Angeles–based record producer, songwriter, and multi-instrumentalist originally from Auckland, New Zealand.

He has written and produced songs with artists including Gracie Abrams, Pink, Rudimental, Muse, James Arthur, Alec Benjamin, Lennon Stella, Noah Kahan, Maisie Peters, Anson Seabra, Thirty Seconds to Mars, Marina, Little Mix, and Gary Clark Jr.

== Select discography ==
Year	Song	Artist	Credit
2026	"Flatline"	Devon Gabriella	Producer, co-writer
2026	"whiplash"	Gabriella Bee	Producer, co-writer
2026	"Oxygen"	Amira Elfeky	Producer
2026	"Mess Like Mine"	Blair Davie	Co-writer
2026	"You Like Ugly, Dont You Babe"	Blair Davie	Co-writer
2026	"Just My Luck"	Natalie Jinju	Producer, co-writer
2026	"One Track Mind"	Mel C	Producer, co-writer
2026	"Wild Horse"	Freya Ridings	Producer, co-writer
2025	"Queen Of Homecoming"	Sydney Ross Mitchell	Producer, co-writer
2025	"People Pleaser"	Henry Moodie	Producer, co-writer
2025	"Burn It Down"	Sam Ryder	Co-writer
2025	"Pretending"	Alec Benjamin	Producer
2025	"Favor"	Maeve	Co-producer, co-writer
2025	"Ghost On The Radio"	Elijah Woods	Co-producer, co-writer
2025	"Same Mouth"	Alessi Rose	Co-producer, co-writer
2025	"Who"	Lyn Lapid	Producer, co-writer
2025	"Time To Say Goodbye" (from the Godfather of Harlem season 4 soundtrack)	Cruel Youth	Co-writer
2025	"Falling for a Friend"	grentperez	Producer, co-writer
2025	"Sugarcoat"	Jacob Banks	Producer, co-writer
2025	"Committed to a Bit"	Corook	Co-writer
2025	"Praying For Your Downfall"	Jensen McRae	Co-producer, co-writer
2024	"Running Through Colors"	Phantogram	Co-producer, co-writer
2024	"I Wanna Know"	Phantogram	Co-producer, co-writer
2024	"The Plan"	Alec Benjamin	Producer
2024	"Ease Up"	Chanyeol	Producer, co-writer
2024	"2AM"	Forest Claudette	Co-producer, co-writer
2024	"Close to You"	Gracie Abrams	Producer, co-writer
2024	"Two Friends"	Amy Shark	Producer, co-writer
2024	"Is It My Face?"	Juliet Ivy	Producer, co-writer
2024	"Good as You"	Johnny Huynh	Producer, co-writer
2024	"Sacrifice Tomorrow"	Alec Benjamin	Producer
2024	"Up at Night"	Stephen Dawes	Producer, co-writer
2024	"What We Wanted"	Stephen Dawes	Producer, co-writer
2024	"Amnesia"	Zevia	Producer, co-writer
2024	"American Horror Story"	Birskie	Co-producer, co-writer
2024	"Baby Bangs" (feat. Dacelyn)	Frances Forever	Producer, co-writer
2024	"Jesus Song (County Line)"	Brenn!	Co-writer
2024	"Brave"	James Arthur	Producer, co-writer
2024	"Lose Me Too"	Rosie	Producer, co-writer
2024	"Forget You"	Jessica Mauboy	Producer, co-writer
2024	Gone for Good"	Devon Gabriella	Producer, co-writer
2023	"Another Song About Love"	Wrabel	Co-producer
2023	"Just Like You"	Wrabel	Producer
2023	"Beautiful Day"	Wrabel	Co-producer
2023	"Lost Cause"	Wrabel	Co-writer
2023	"Loving Means Leaving"	Anson Seabra	Producer, co-writer
2023	"What About the One Who Leaves"	Anson Seabra	Producer, co-writer
2023	"If We Started Talking Again"	Anson Seabra	Producer, co-writer
2023	"Collide"	Anson Seabra	Producer, co-writer
2023	"Used to Be Yours"	Anson Seabra	Producer, co-writer
2023	"Next Life"	Anson Seabra	Producer, co-writer
2023	"A Heart is a Terrible Thing To Break"	Anson Seabra	Producer, co-writer
2023	"Lucid Dream"	Duncan Laurence	Producer
2023	"Life On The Moon"	Duncan Laurence	Producer
2023	"California Rose"	Duncan Laurence	Producer, co-writer
2023	"Rest in Peace"	Duncan Laurence	Producer, co-writer
2023	"Anything"	Duncan Laurence	Producer, co-writer
2023	"Heartbreak Souvenirs"	Anson Seabra	Producer, co-writer
2023	"Don't Be So Hard On Yourself"	Wrabel	Producer
2023	"Find It"	Wrabel	Producer
2023	"We All Could Use Some Help"	Wrabel	Co-producer
2023	"Abstract Art"	Wrabel	Producer, co-writer
2023	"Running Out"	Stephen Dawes	Co-producer
2023	"Happiest Girl In The World"	Stephen Dawes	Co-producer
2023	"19"	Stephen Dawes	Producer, co-writer
2023	"Supposed To Be a Love Song"	Anson Seabra	Producer, co-writer
2023	"Broken Boy"	Anson Seabra	Producer, co-writer
2023	"Ok With It"	Lyn Lapid	Producer, co-writer
2023	"Monster"	Danielle Bradbery	Producer, co-writer
2023	"Better Broken"	Devon Gilfillian	Co-writer
2023	"Lost Cause"	Pink	Producer, co-writer
2023	"One Drink Away"	Wrabel	Producer, co-writer
2023	"You Got Yours"	Wrabel	Producer
2023	"Feel It Now (Alive)"	Wrabel	Producer
2023	"Happier"	Wrabel	Producer
2022	"Paper Crown"	Alec Benjamin	Producer
2022	"Georgia"	Jonah Kagen	Co-writer
2022	"Broken"	Sofia Valdes, Pink Sweats	Producer
2022	"18"	Anson Seabra	Producer, co-writer
2022	"All In Due Time"	Joshua Bassett	Producer, co-writer
2022	"Matter Of Time"	Meg Mac	Producer, co-writer
2022	"Act My Age"	Pale Waves	Co-writer
2022	"The Hard Way"	Pale Waves	Co-writer
2022	"Lies"	Pale Waves	Co-writer
2022	"Two Spaces In Between"	Francis Karel	Producer, co-writer
2022	"Sugarcoat"	Ash Lune	Producer, co-writer
2022	"By Design"	Jacob Banks	Producer
2022	"How To Save A Life"	TALK	Producer
2022	"Lies"	Pale Waves	Co-writer
2022	"Deniro"	Alec Benjamin	Producer
2022	"Hipocrite"	Alec Benjamin	Producer
2022	"I Tried"	Camylio	Producer, co-writer
2022	"Brave"	Ella Henderson	Additional producer
2021	"Foolish"	Camylio	Co-producer, co-writer
2021	"Black and White"	Camylio	Co-producer
2021	"Unbreak"	Camylio	Producer
2021	"Lucky Charms"	Anson Seabra	Producer
2021	"Magazines"	Anson Seabra	Producer
2021	"U Hurt Me Hurts U"	Anson Seabra	Producer
2021	"We're Not In Kansas Anymore"	Anson Seabra	Producer
2021	"Handle My Own"	Rudimental, Ella Henderson	Co-producer, co-writer
2021	"Sometimes"	Camylio	Producer
2021	"Therapy"	Catie Turner	Producer
2021	"Silhouette"	Sofia Valdes	Producer
2021	"Magazines"	Anson Seabra	Producer
2021	"Miss You"	Amy Shark	Producer, co-writer
2021	"Polluted Love"	Elliphant	Producer, co-writer
2021	"To Begin Again"	Ingrid Michaelson, Zayn	Producer
2021	"It's Raining, It's Pouring"	Anson Seabra	Producer
2021	"Black n White"	Jacob Banks	Producer, co-writer
2021	"Parade"	Jacob Banks	Producer, co-writer
2021	"Odd Ones Out"	Pale Waves	Co-writer
2021	"Fall To Pieces"	Pale Waves	Co-writer
2021	"You Don't Own Me"	Pale Waves	Co-writer
2021	"Oceans Away"	Sofia Valdes	Producer
2021	"Lonely"	Sofia Valdes	Producer
2021	"Easy"	Pale Waves	Co-writer
2021	"Play God"	Catie Turner	Producer
2020	"She's My Religion"	Pale Waves	Co-writer
2020	"Walked Through Hell"	Anson Seabra	Producer, co-writer
2020	"One Day"	Catie Turner	Producer
2020	"Change"	Pale Waves	Co-producer, co-writer
2020	"Little Did I Know"	Sofia Valdes	Producer, co-writer
2020	"Empty Love (feat. Ruel)"	GRACEY	Producer, co-writer
2020	"Games"	Lennon Stella	Producer
2020	"Weakness" feat. Maisey Stella (Huey Lewis)	Lennon Stella	Producer, co-writer
2020	"Watching You - Stripped"	Robinson	Producer
2020	"Watching You"	Robinson	Producer
2020	"Don't Say"	Robinson	Producer
2020	"Lie to Me"	Robinson	Producer
2020	"I Tried"	Robinson	Producer
2020	"Minor"	Gracie Abrams	Vocal producer
2019	"Loser"	Moby Rich	Producer, co-writer
2019	"Self Sabotage"	Moby Rich	Producer, co-writer
2019	"Stay"	Gracie Abrams	Producer, co-writer
2019	"Mad at You"	Navvy	Producer, co-writer
2019	"100 Thousand"	Navvy	Producer, co-writer
2019	"Cologne"	Isaac Dunbar	Producer, co-writer
2019	"Young and in Love"	Ingrid Michaelson	Producer, co-writer
2019	"Missing You"	Ingrid Michaelson	Producer, co-writer
2019	"Hate You"	Ingrid Michaelson	Producer
2019	"Soft to be Strong"	Marina	Producer
2019	"Too Afraid"	Marina	Producer
2019	"You"	Marina	Producer
2019	"Emotional Machine"	Marina	Producer, co-writer
2019	"Superstar"	Marina	Co-producer
2019	"Heartbreak"	Jamie N Commons	Producer, co-writer
2019	"Start Again"	Jamie N Commons	Producer, co-writer
2019	"Won't Let Go"	Jamie N Commons	Producer, co-writer
2019	"Karma"	Robinson	Producer, co-writer
2019	"Stay Young"	Maisie Peters	Co-producer
2018	"Medicine"	Robinson	Co-producer
2018	"Breakaway"	Lennon Stella	Producer, co-writer
2018	"Paper Dreams"	Jamie N Commons	Producer, co-writer
2018	"Woman's World"	Little Mix	Producer
2018	"Gotta Be a Reason"	Alec Benjamin	Producer
2018	"Outrunning Karma"	Alec Benjamin	Producer
2018	"Annabelle's Homework"	Alec Benjamin	Producer
2018	"Boy in the Bubble"	Alec Benjamin	Producer
2018	"Water Fountain"	Alec Benjamin	Producer
2018	"Death of a Hero"	Alec Benjamin	Producer
2018	"Back Again"	Moss Kena	Producer, co-writer
2018	"Closer to You"	Dan Caplen	Co-producer
2018	"Break it to Me (Sam de Jong remix)"	Muse	Producer
2018	"Are You Ready (Sam de Jong remix)"	Disturbed	Producer
2018	"Pitch Dark"	Chelsea Jade	Producer, co-writer
2018	"Let Her Go"	Family of the Year	Producer
2018	"Heart Shaped Culdesac"	Daye Jack	Producer
2018	"Alright"	CYN	Producer, co-writer
2018	"Nothing to Regret"	Robinson	Co-producer
2017	"Lucid"	Mitch James	Producer
2017	"All The Ways to Say Goodbye"	Mitch James	Producer, co-writer
2017	"Crave You"	Robinson	Producer
2017	"Come Together"	Gary Clark Jr	Co-producer
2017	"Hurt Somebody"	Noah Kahan	Co-producer
2017	"Walk on Water"	Thirty Seconds to Mars	Additional producer
2016	"Move On"	Mitch James	Producer, co-writer
2016	"Oh My My"	Nomad	Producer
2016	"Kind of Love"	Maala	Producer, co-writer
2016	"Hurricane Love"	L.A Women	Producer
2016	"Home"	Mae Valley	Producer
2016	"Glitter"	Mae Valley	Producer
2016	"I Won't Be Long"	Mae Valley	Producer
2016	"Hurricane"	Mae Valley	Producer
2016	"Brightside"	Mae Valley	Producer
2016	"This is Where Love Comes From"	Benny Tipene	Producer
2015	"Love Me Anyway"	Ginny Blackmore	Producer, co-writer
2014	"Young"	Benny Tipene	Producer
2014	"Not Coming Back"	Benny Tipene	Producer
2014	"Give This Up"	Benny Tipene	Producer
2014	"Open Ending"	Benny Tipene	Producer
2014	"Hooked On Love"	Benny Tipene	Producer
2014	"Either Gone or Lost"	Benny Tipene	Producer
2014	"Good Man"	Benny Tipene	Producer
2014	"No Good For Me"	Benny Tipene	Producer
2014	"Step on Up"	Benny Tipene	Producer
2014	"Walking on Water"	Benny Tipene	Producer
2014	"Better Side"	Benny Tipene	Producer
2014	"Fight for You"	Benny Tipene	Producer
2014	"Toulouse"	Benny Tipene	Producer
2014	"Embrace"	Benny Tipene	Producer
2014	"Lonely"	Benny Tipene	Producer
2014	"Make You Mine"	Benny Tipene	Producer
2013	"Runaway"	Stan Walker	Producer, co-writer
