= Unwanted (album) =

2022 album by Pale Waves

Studio album by Pale Waves
- Released: 12 August 2022
- Recorded: 2021
- Studios: MDDN, California
- Genre: Pop-punk
- Length: 39:05
- Label: Dirty Hit
- Producer: Zakk Cervini

Pale Waves chronology
Who Am I? (2021)	Unwanted (2022)	Smitten (2024)

Singles from Unwanted
- 1. "Lies" Released: 9 May 2022; 2. "Reasons to Live" Released: 8 June 2022; 3. "Jealousy" Released: 27 June 2022; 4. "The Hard Way" Released: 20 July 2022; 5. "Clean" Released: 12 August 2022

Unwanted is the third studio album by English rock band Pale Waves. It was released on 12 August 2022 by the independent record label Dirty Hit. The record was produced by Zakk Cervini and recorded in Los Angeles. Production for the record began roughly half a year after Pale Waves released their second album, Who Am I? (2021), with the quick turnaround due in large part to the COVID-19 pandemic, which prevented the band from touring. Indebted to the pop-punk genre, Unwanted was intended to be heavier and more aggressive than the band's previous work.

Heather Baron-Gracie (the band's lead singer and rhythm guitarist) co-wrote all of the album's songs with a close group of musical collaborators, including drummer Doran, Kelsi Luck, Cervini, Sam de Jong, Whakaio Taahi, Andrew Goldstein, and Drew Fulk. Many of the lyrics on Unwanted discuss darker topics, including anger, jealousy, substance use, depression, and suicide. Musically, the record was inspired by bands and musicians like Paramore, My Chemical Romance, Green Day, Liz Phair, and Courtney Love. Many critics have also compared the album to the work of Avril Lavigne.

According to review aggregators Metacritic and AnyDecentMusic?, Unwanted received mostly positive reviews from critics, with many applauding the band's continuing evolution, the record's heavier sound, and Cervini's pop-punk production. Some critics felt that the album was too prosaic and derivative. Unwanted debuted at number four on the UK Albums Chart and at number one on the UK Independent Albums Chart. To support the album, music videos for the songs "Lies", "Reasons to Live", "Jealousy", "Clean", and "Unwanted" were released.

== Production ==
=== Background ===
In 2018, Pale Waves released their debut album, My Mind Makes Noises. Heavily influenced by the music of the 1980s, the record received mostly positive attention. Three years later, in 2021, the band released their second album, Who Am I? This record moved away from the 80s-inspired sound of the band's debut, instead taking inspiration from the alternative rock and pop rock of the 1990s and 2000. The album's lyrics focused mostly on lead singer Heather Baron-Gracie's romantic life and her LGBTQ+ identity. Because Who Am I? was released during the COVID-19 pandemic, Pale Waves had to postpone a tour in support of the album until 2022.

=== Inspiration and writing ===
Pale Waves began working on the songs from Unwanted shortly after the release of Who Am I? – a quick turnaround which Baron-Gracie attributed to the COVID-19 pandemic having "deprived [them] from playing live music". In an interview with Zane Lowe's Apple Music 1 show, Baron-Gracie further explained that the group wanted Unwanted to be a fun, high-energy record to perform live. Pale Waves thus decided to embrace a "heavier" pop-punk sound that emphasized distorted guitars over synthesizers; Baron-Gracie touched upon this topic again in an interview with University College Dublin's student newspaper, The University Observer, when she contended that the album "hits harder" than their previous work and better emphasizes the pop punk side of the band.

When talking to MTV News writer Carson Mlnarik, Baron-Gracie asserted that, tonally, Unwanted is darker than previous Pale Waves's releases: "I feel like overall this album in particular touches upon subjects that we’ve never touched upon before, like loss, vanity, anger, jealousy, hopelessness ... It’s very dark. It’s very personal." In a write-up released by Rock Sound, the band cited Liz Phair and Courtney Love as inspiring some of the album's "angst and anger", and due to these emotions, Baron-Gracie felt that the record was raw and genuine. The general sound of Unwanted was further inspired heavily by American pop punk band Paramore.

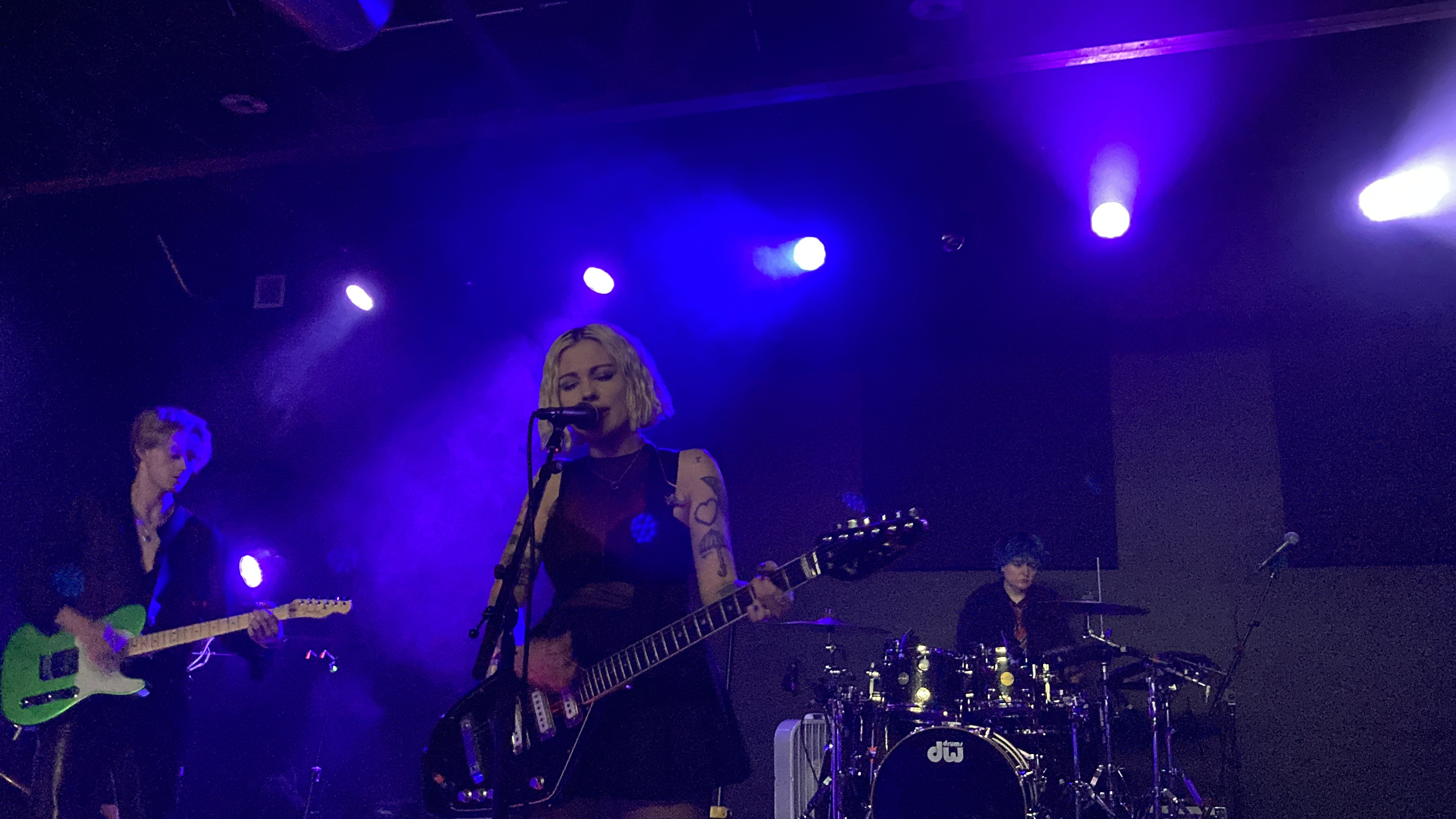
Pale Waves, performing live in June 2022

The songs on Unwanted were written by Baron-Gracie, Ciara Doran (the band's drummer), Kelsi Luck (Baron-Gracie's partner), Zakk Cervini (the album's producer), Sam de Jong, Whakaio Taahi, Andrew Goldstein, and Drew Fulk. De Jong had previously worked with Baron-Gracie during the production of Pale Waves's second album, Who Am I?, and Goldstein had co-written the All Time Low single "PMA", which featured Pale Waves. The overall songwriting process was "intimate", and Baron-Gracie told MTV that it was "the first time where [she] felt relaxed, in a state of not panicking or a state of not second-guessing everything".

=== Recording ===
In September 2021, Heather Baron-Gracie shared a photo on herself and Ciara Doran via Instagram that revealed the band was working on a follow-up to Who Am I? For this record, the band worked with Zakk Cervini, who had previously produced albums by bands like All Time Low, Poppy, Waterparks, and Yungblud. Baron-Gracie and Cervini met when she recorded guest vocals on the All Time Low single "PMA", which Cervini produced, and when speaking to Alternative Press, Baron-Gracie explained:

Zakk was the perfect match for us. The first time that I met him, I knew that he needed to produce our next record. He’s just a breath of fresh air, is so positive, talented and just the most genuinely nice guy ever. ... With Zakk, [recording] was just so natural. We all knew what kind of record we wanted to make with Pale Waves and were on the same wavelength. There were no clashes, and it was just so easy. Zakk really helped us create a solid piece of work that we are so happy about and wouldn’t have been the same without him.

Thanks to the band-producer dynamic and the atmosphere in the studio, working on Unwanted was "the first time ... [Baron-Gracie] actually enjoyed recording", telling Alternative Press, "All of my other previous times, I was so stressed out or having a freak out every minute". On December 4, 2021, Baron-Gracie announced on Instagram that recording for the record had concluded.

== Music and lyrics ==
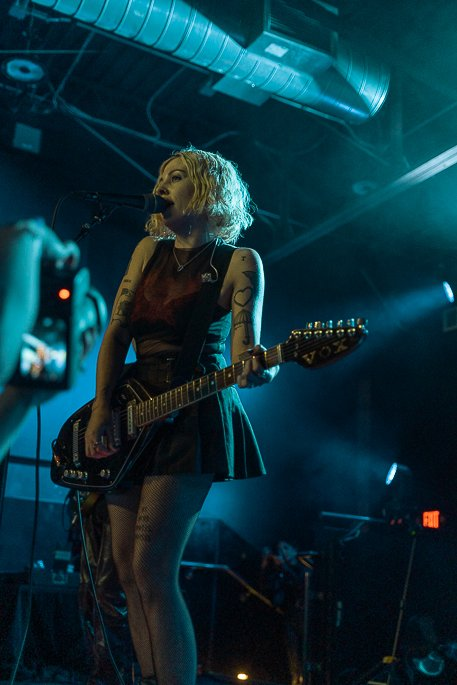
All of the songs on "Unwanted" were co-written by Heather Baron-Gracie (M. Sean McClintock, Neon Sagwagon).

"Lies" opens the album and was released as its first single. An "angst-fueled, rebellious pop-punk anthem" inspired by the "crunchy guitars and rhythmic drive of 2000s" and "90s rock", the song's lyrics focus on someone who built up and then destroyed Baron-Gracie's trust. The album's title track, "Unwanted", was inspired by Baron-Gracie's frustration with sexist double standards, specifically when it comes to expressions of anger. In a breakdown of the album's track listing with Apple Music, Baron-Gracie further stated that the song epitomizes the album's darkness and the "feelings of neglect, anger, vanity, jealousy, sadness, [and] depression" on which it is predicated. "The Hard Way" – a track that begins as an "intimate, lullaby-like acoustic" work that "builds toward soaring electric guitars" – was inspired by the music of My Chemical Romance and Green Day. Lyrically, the song discusses a girl Baron-Gracie went to high school with who was a victim of bullying and who died by suicide. "The Hard Way" further expresses Baron-Gracie's regret that she did not try to help her classmate.

"Jealousy" is an alternative rock track that has been compared to the work of Alanis Morissette, Avril Lavigne, and The Subways. Sung from the perspective of a possessive lover who is cognizant of her behavior, the track was inspired by Baron-Gracie's personal feelings on the titular emotion: "I love a bit of jealousy – not too much, but just enough… I want jealousy in a relationship because it shows me the person only has eyes for me and me only." "Alone" is, according to Baron-Gracie, "the ultimate rejection song": "It's about when you say no to someone and they just don't leave you alone." The lyrics to the song were inspired by the many times someone had hit on Baron-Gracie and either failed or refused to notice her visible disinterest. Baron-Gracie has described "Clean" as a "cheesy love song" that was written to encapsulate the exhilaration of falling in love. Despite Unwanted being an angry record overall, the band included "Clean" so that the album would have moments of positivity. "Without You" is a ballad whose lyrics focus on the pain of loss, and "Only Problem" – a track that NME compared to the work of Paramore – was inspired by Baron-Gracie's former reliance on alcohol to feel confident and secure.

"You're So Vain" was inspired by Baron-Gracie's experience with music industry insiders who she feels are self-centered. Musically, the song has been compared to the music of Avril Lavigne, while Baron-Gracie has argued that the track owes more to "classic rock and roll" due to its aggressive energy. "Reasons to Live" – a positive, "romantic" track thematically similar to the band's previous 2021 single "Easy" – has been described as a "euphoric burst of electric energy about finding someone who leads you out of darkness". According to Baron-Gracie: "[The song] is about a time when I felt truly drained and incapable of happiness [but] then I found someone who showed me a reason to live." "Numb" is a more restrained number that focuses on Baron-Gracie's struggles with depression. "Act My Age" discusses the difficulties inherent in growing older and feeling the urge to behave in a more mature way. The album's closer, "So Sick (Of Missing You)", was inspired by the Netflix series Sex Education, in particular the relationship between main characters Maeve and Otis. Baron-Gracie related to elements of their relationship and decided to use the two as inspiration for this song.

== Promotion ==
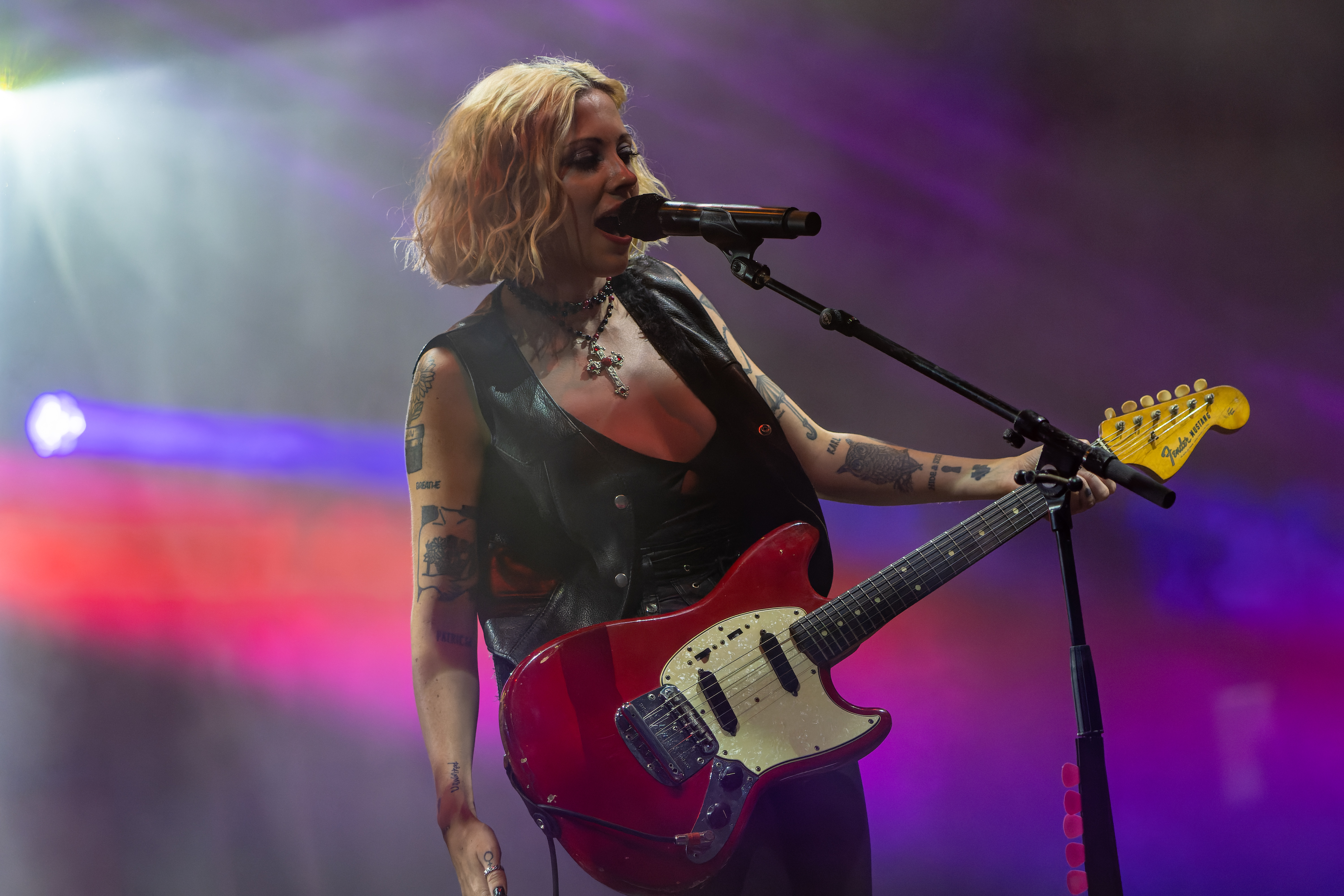
Pale Waves, performing at Boardmasters Festival on 14 August 2022

The first single from Unwanted was "Lies", which debuted on BBC Radio 1 on 9 May 2022. A video for the track, directed by the visual artist Vasilisa Forbes, was also released at this time, alongside an announcement about the album itself. The video sees the band performing the song on a glowing cube in an otherwise darkened room. The album's second single, "Reasons to Live", was released on 8 June 2022, also making its debut on BBC Radio 1. A video for "Reasons to Live" (directed by Kelsi Luck and filmed in Las Vegas) was released on 25 July, 2022; it features Baron-Gracie singing the song in the back of a limousine while her bandmates happily party alongside her.

"Jealousy", the third single from the record, was released on 27 June 2022, debuting on BBC Radio 1. A music video for the song, directed by Vasilisa Forbes, was released the same day that the record made its radio debut. In the video (which is filmed in black and white), the band performs the song against a minimalist background. Baron-Gracie is also shown singing from behind a chain-link fence, and while hanging from a chain swing. The album's fourth single, "The Hard Way", was released on 20 July 2022 through streaming services. On 12 August – the date of the album's release – a video for "Clean", directed by Forbes, was released. A video for "Unwanted" (filmed during the band's stint opening for 5 Seconds of Summer during the summer of 2022) was released on October 25, 2022.

Pale Waves hosted an album release show at the Pryzm Kingston nightclub on 11 August 2022, and the band performed a series of in-house acoustic shows at select record stores in the weeks thereafter. In September, Pale Waves began a North America tour, but on 20 September, they were forced to cancel their remaining US shows due to safety issues with their tour bus. In November, the band performed a series of shows in Japan and the United Kingdom.

== Reception ==
Professional ratings
Aggregate scores
Source	Rating
AnyDecentMusic?	7.2/10
Metacritic	72/100
Review scores
Source	Rating
DIY	4/5 stars
Dork	4/5 stars
Gigwise	8/10 stars
Kerrang	4/5 stars
The Line of Best Fit	6/10 stars
NME	4/5 stars
Pitchfork	6.1/10
The Skinny	4/5 stars
The Telegraph	3/5 stars
The Times	4/5 stars

Unwanted was met with mostly positive reviews from critics. At Metacritic, which assigns a weighted average rating out of 100 to reviews from mainstream publications, the release has an average score of 72 based on seven reviews, meaning that it has received "generally favorable reviews". Fellow music aggregator AnyDecentMusic? likewise gave the album an average score of 7.2/10, based on ten reviews.

Calling the record "bold and unapologetic," Elly Watson of DIY magazine felt that Unwanted was a "defiant expression of darker emotions". Watson gave the album a four-out-of-five stars and concluded that it comprised "pop-punk anthem[s] your ‘00s faves wish they could’ve written". In a four-out-of-five star review for Dork magazine, Martyn Young wrote that "Unwanted is the ultimate realisation of their journey from eighties-indebted indie-pop to full-on pop-punk giants" and that it was "poised to take Pale Waves to new stratospheric levels". Young appreciated that the album built off the aesthetic of their previous record, Who Am I?, all the while being heavier, sonically, than its predecessor. In a four-out-of-five star review for The Times, Lisa Verrico, too, compared the album to Who Am I?, feeling that Unwanted was more consistent. Like Young, Verrico also noted the release's "genuine heaviness", which she attributed to Zakk Cervini's production work. James Hickie of Kerang magazine contended that Unwanted was replete with "squeaky clean riffs and melodies that are easy to love but hard to forget." Hickie ultimately gave the record four out of five stars.

Andy Price of NME called the sound of Unwanted "an evolution few could have predicted", but he nevertheless applauded the record for being "fierce" and for "brashly plunging deep into the pop-punk grab-bag". He ultimately gave the record four out of five stars, concluding that the album "rais[es] the shipwreck of pop-punk from yesteryear and re-[fits] it as the flagship for those who feel genuinely maligned". Edwin McFee of Hot Press gave the record an eight out of ten. Calling Unwanted "honest and provocative", McFee positively compared it to the work of Paramore, Avril Lavigne, and Hole. Gigwise reviewer Lana Williams, in an eight-out-of-ten star review, wrote that Unwanted "flirt[s] with romanticism and vulnerability" and "encompasses the best of what Pale Waves have to offer: an in-your-face, unapologetic exploration of emotions and the human psyche." Williams positively compared several of the tracks to the music of Halsey, The Pretty Reckless, and Avril Lavigne. Dylan Tuck called the record a "catalogue of anthemic pop-punk singalongs" in a four-out-of-five star review for The Skinny. "Swimming through sincere subjects", Tuck wrote, "Baron-Gracie displays growth as a lyricist and sticks a middle finger up to the doubters." Tuck also complimented the album's pop punk sound and Zakk Cervini's production.

Danny Cooper of Pitchfork gave the album a 6.1/10. While calling the record a collection of "precise, catchy, well-executed pop-punk earworms", Cooper critiqued Baron-Gracie's songwriting, which he felt was often cliché, unaffecting, and mired in "shallow melodrama". Marie Oleinik of The Line of Best Fit wrote that, with Unwanted, Pale Waves either "are comfortable exactly where they are, or maybe they want to play it safe and stick with what works". Oleinik also felt that the record's sound was too derivative of the large pop-punk scene. Tony Clayton-Lea of The Irish Times gave the album three out of five stars, writing: "Manchester's Pale Waves may not have an original idea in their bag of indie-pop/rock tricks, but that doesn't mean to say they can’t shake it up like the best of their influences (think My Chemical Romance, Avril Lavigne, Green Day, Paramore, Hole)." Despite feeling that much of the album was generic, Clayton-Lea wrote positively of Baron-Grace's musical delivery. Andrew Perry of The Telegraph gave Unwanted three out of five stars and described it as a record "along the lines of one of Courtney Love’s air-brushed, songwriter-assisted solo outings, with all guns blazing for radio-friendliness".

=== Accolades ===
Publication	Accolade	Rank	Ref.
Dork	Best of 2022: Albums of the Year	76	
Kerrang	The 50 Best Albums of 2022	50	
Rock Sound	The Rock Sound Albums of 2022	—N/a	

== Commercial performance ==
Unwanted was released on 12 August 2022 by the independent record label Dirty Hit on vinyl, CD, cassette, and as a digital download. In addition to the standard CD releases, Dirty Hit also released four alternate cover variants (each showcasing a different member of the band), and Blood Records released a "holographic" vinyl variant limited to 1000 hand-number copies. An extended version of the album – entitled the "Antidote Edition – was released exclusively through Apple Music. This release includes four bonus tracks: live versions of "Jealousy", "Reasons to Live", and "So Sick (Of Missing You)", as well as a live cover of the Wheatus single "Teenage Dirtbag". Additionally, the Japanese release of the album came bundled with the bonus track "I Hope that You're Happy Now".

Upon its release, Unwanted debuted at number 4 on the UK Albums Chart (Official Charts Company), (Note: Prior to its official debut on the UK Albums Chart, Unwanted charted at number two on the midweek UK Albums Chart Update.) selling 6,985 copies. On the UK Independent Albums Chart (OOC), it debuted at number 1, and on the Official Vinyl Albums, Official Physical Albums, and Official Record Store Charts (OOC), the record debuted at number 2. On the Scottish Albums Chart, Unwanted peaked at number 2, making it the band's third consecutive Top 10 album in that country. In Japan, Unwanted reached 166 on the Oricon Albums Chart, and it peaked at number 86 on Billboard Japan's Download Albums chart.

== Track listing ==
Unwanted track listing
No.	Title	Writer(s)	Length
1.	"Lies"	Heather Baron-Gracie; Sam de Jong	2:50
2.	"Unwanted"	Baron-Gracie; Andrew Goldstein; Zakk Cervini	2:54
3.	"The Hard Way"	Baron-Gracie; de Jong	3:25
4.	"Jealousy"	Baron-Gracie; Whakaio Taahi	3:12
5.	"Alone"	Baron-Gracie; Goldstein; Cervini	3:12
6.	"Clean"	Baron-Gracie; Ciara Doran; Cervini; Drew Fulk	2:51
7.	"Without You"	Baron-Gracie; Goldstein; Cervini	3:40
8.	"Only Problem"	Baron-Gracie; Goldstein; Cervini	3:02
9.	"You're So Vain"	Baron-Gracie; Kelsi Luck; Goldstein; Cervini; Fulk	2:41
10.	"Reasons to Live"	Baron-Gracie; Doran; Cervini	2:47
11.	"Numb"	Baron-Gracie; Luck; Cervini	2:46
12.	"Act My Age"	Baron-Gracie; de Jong	2:52
13.	"So Sick (Of Missing You)"	Baron-Gracie; Doran; Goldstein; Cervini	2:53
Total length:			39:05

Bonus tracks

"Antidote Edition" bonus tracks
No.	Title	Writer(s)	Length
14.	"Jealousy" (Antidote Live Session)	Baron-Gracie; Taahi	2:40
15.	"Reasons to Live" (Antidote Live Session)	Baron-Gracie; Doran; Cervini	2:36
16.	"So Sick (Of Missing You)" (Antidote Live Session)	Baron-Gracie; Doran; Goldstein; Cervini	3:10
17.	"Teenage Dirtbag" (Antidote Live Session)	Brendan B. Brown	3:42
Total length:			51:13

Japanese release
No.	Title	Writer(s)	Length
14.	"I Hope that You're Happy Now"	Pale Waves	2:51
Total length:			41:56

}}

== Personnel ==
Credits adapted from the liner notes of Unwanted.

Pale Waves

- Heather Baron-Gracie – vocals, guitar
- Ciara Doran – drums

The other two members of the band, Hugo Silvani (guitar) and Charlie Wood (bass), are not credited in the liner notes as having performed on the album.

Additional musicians

- Zakk Cervini - guitar, bass guitar, drums, programming
- Andrew Goldstein – guitar (tracks 2, 5, 7, 8 and 13), keyboard (tracks 7 and 8), strings (track 7)
- Drew Fulk – guitar (tracks 6 and 9)

Technical

- Zakk Cervini – production
- Nik Trekov – additional production, engineering and editing
- Michael Bono – additional production and editing

== Charts ==
Chart performance for Unwanted
Chart (2022)	Peak position
Download Albums (Billboard Japan)	86
Japanese Albums (Oricon)	166
Scottish Albums (OCC)	2
UK Albums (OCC)	4
UK Independent Albums (OCC)	1

== Release history ==
Country	Date	Format	Variant	Label	Catalog no.	Ref.
Various	12 August 2022	CD	Standard	Dirty Hit	DH01401	
Various	12 August 2022	CD	"Heather" cover	Dirty Hit	DH01516	
Various	12 August 2022	CD	"Ciara" cover	Dirty Hit	DH01517	
Various	12 August 2022	CD	"Hugo" cover	Dirty Hit	DH01518	
Various	12 August 2022	CD	"Charlie" cover	Dirty Hit	DH01519	
Various	12 August 2022	LP	"Black ice" variant	Dirty Hit	DH01300	
Various	12 August 2022	LP	Purple variant	Dirty Hit	DH01398	
Various	12 August 2022	LP	Blood Records variant	Dirty Hit	DH01400	
Various	12 August 2022	Cassette	Pink variant	Dirty Hit	DH01402	
Various	12 August 2022	Cassette	Glitter variant	Dirty Hit	DH01403	
Various	12 August 2022	Cassette	Translucent red variant	Dirty Hit	DH01404	
Various	12 August 2022	Digital download	—	Dirty Hit	—	
Various	12 August 2022	Streaming	—	Dirty Hit	—	
