= Perfume (disambiguation) =

Perfume is a mixture of fragrant essential oils and aroma compounds, fixatives, and solvents used to give a pleasant smell.

Perfume may also refer to:

== Music ==
- Perfume (British band), a British indie band
- Perfume (Japanese band), a Japanese pop group from Hiroshima

=== Songs and albums ===
- "Perfume" (Parade song), a 2011 song from the album Parade
- "Perfume" (Britney Spears song), a 2013 song from the album Britney Jean
- "Perfume" (Pale Waves song), a 2024 song from the album Smitten
- Perfume (EP), a 2023 EP by NCT DoJaeJung
- Perfume, a 1992 album by Megumi Hayashibara
- "Perfume", a 2006 song by Perfume from the album Perfume: Complete Best
- "Perfume", a 2006 song by Sparks from the album Hello Young Lovers
- "Perfume", a 2007 song by Yuna Ito from the album Heart
- "Perfume", a 2015 song by Apink from the album Pink Memory
- "Perfume", a 2021 song by Lovejoy from the EP Pebble Brain
- "Perfume", a 2025 song by Takanashi Kiara from the album Vogelfrei
- "Perfume", a 2026 song by Seungmin from the album SKZ-Replay 2026 Pt.1

== Other uses ==
- Perfume (2001 film), a 2001 film starring Paul Sorvino
- Perfume (novel), a 1985 novel by Patrick Süskind

- Perfume: The Story of a Murderer (film), a 2006 film based on the novel
- Perfume (2018 TV series), a 2018 German TV series, inspired by both the novel and the 2006 film

- Perfume Pagoda, a buddhist temple complexes in northern Vietnam
- Perfume River, a river in central Vietnam
- Perfume (South Korean TV series), a 2019 South Korean TV series
- "Perfume" (The Apprentice), a 2019 television episode
- Perfumes (film), a 2019 French film
