= Smitten (Pale Waves album) =

Studio album by Pale Waves
- Released: 27 September 2024
- Studios: Baxter House Studios (Los Angeles); Echo Zoo Studios (Eastbourne); Ten87 Studios (London)
- Genres: Indie pop; alternative rock; synth-pop; pop; jangle pop
- Length: 40:16
- Label: Dirty Hit
- Producers: Simon Oscroft; Iain Berryman; Hugo Silvani

Pale Waves chronology
Unwanted (2022)	Smitten (2024)	Live from Metropolis Studios (2024)

Singles from Smitten
- 1. "Perfume" Released: 12 June 2024; 2. "Glasgow" Released: 12 July 2024; 3. "Gravity" Released: 15 August 2024; 4. "Thinking About You" Released: 13 September 2024; 5. "Kiss Me Again" Released: 24 September 2024

Smitten is the fourth studio album by the English rock band Pale Waves. It was released on 27 September 2024 by the independent record label Dirty Hit. Co-produced by Simon Oscroft, Iain Berryman, and Hugo Silvani, Smitten was recorded in both Los Angeles and London, with production beginning in late 2023. Unlike the band's previous albums Who Am I? (2021) and Unwanted (2022), Smitten is closer in style to the group's earlier jangle-inspired synth-pop sound.

The lyrics on Smitten were largely inspired by lead singer Heather Baron-Gracie's reflections on her teenage diary, as well as her meditation on the emotions of early queer relationships; this resulted in a record that Baron-Gracie later described as "romantic, delicate, and feminine". Musically, the record was inspired by musicians like Kelsea Ballerini, Kacey Musgraves, and Dolores O'Riordan of the Cranberries. Critics have also noted the influence of popular '80s bands like the Cure and Cocteau Twins.

According to review aggregators Metacritic and AnyDecentMusic?, Smitten received mostly positive reviews, with critics praising the record's ambitious pop hooks, its mature songwriting, and its return to the band's original synth-pop sound. Criticism was directed at the album's sound for being too simplistic. Smitten debuted at number 13 on the UK Albums Chart and at number three on the UK Independent Albums Chart. To support the album, music videos for the songs "Perfume", "Glasgow", "Gravity", and "Thinking About You" were released.

== Production ==
=== Inspiration and writing ===
Pale Waves began to work on the songs that would comprise Smitten soon after the release of their 2022 album Unwanted, with the band's lead singer and guitarist Heather Baron-Gracie served as primary songwriter. When asked about the nature of these songs in a 2023 interview with Kerrang! magazine, Baron-Gracie responded: "All of my attention and energy is going into writing and recording our best album yet. Ultimately, that's about building a world that feels like Pale Waves, while also feeling completely different to anywhere we've inhabited before. We're creating another universe for our fans to explore, and for us to live in for a moment."

The album's lyrical themes were inspired by Baron-Gracie's choice to revisit her "long-forgotten" teenage diary and explore any emotional material she happened to come across. This, in turn, led her to pen songs that reflected on the totality of her romantic experiences. Baron-Gracie ultimately welcomed the chance to revisit the past, as it allowed her to realise that as people mature, they become more open to reflecting on parts of their lives that they may have previously blocked out. Many of the songs on Smitten came to focus on "the excitement and euphoria as well as the confusion and pain of early queer relationships". Others were influenced by Baron-Gracie's own journey of self-discovery, namely her belief that she should fully embrace her queer sexuality, self-love, and ultimately be "comfortable and confident" in who she is.

During the songwriting process, the band would often "sit down with an acoustic guitar" and experiment with musical snippets or ideas, constructing a song as they went. Once Baron-Gracie had worked out a portion of a song with which she was satisfied, she would record a rough take as a voice memo on her phone.

=== Recording ===
The album was co-produced by Simon Oscroft, Iain Berryman, and Hugo Silvani (lead guitarist of Pale Waves). Previously, Oscroft had produced songs by OneRepublic, the Naked and Famous, and the Aces, whereas Berryman had co-produced fellow Dirty Hit artist Beabadoobee's album Beatopia (2022). When asked by Rock Sound how the band decided to work with Oscroft, Baron-Gracie said: "I met Simon when we wrote 'Seeing Stars' together, and I instantly knew that I wanted to write the majority of the record with him ... As a writer and producer, he's so talented, and he understands what I'm going for. ... He's very optimistic and positive. That's what you need when you're writing music, because it can get quite challenging and intense."

Half of the album was recorded in Los Angeles under the direction of Oscroft, and the other half was recorded in Eastbourne and London at Ten87 Studios under the direction of Berryman and Silvani. Initially, Pale Waves had intended for the tracks recorded by Oscroft to serve as demos that the group would then rework upon their return to England. When Pale Waves began to re-record the songs, Baron-Gracie felt that the new versions lacked the raw, emotional "magic" of the originals. To resolve this issue, the band decided to incorporate the vocal takes Baron-Gracie had recorded with Oscroft into the final mix of the album. According to Pale Waves' drummer, Ciara Doran, the band recorded their parts in Eastbourne at a time of the year when it was "cold" and "dark" and recalled that they had a positive experience there.

Most of Baron-Gracie's guitar parts were recorded using a 1980s Fender Stratocaster, a 1965 Fender Mustang that the band's manager Jamie Oborne had gifted her, and a 12-string Vox Phantom that Matty Healy of the 1975 had given to her for her birthday years prior. For his parts, Silvani mainly used a 1970s Fender Telecaster, which he had also received as a gift from Oborne. Pedals used by the band included a Roland Echo unit, a DOD chorus pedal, and Big Muffs for any "heavy" sounds. The band also employed both Fender Twin and Vox AC30 guitar amplifiers.

== Music and lyrics ==
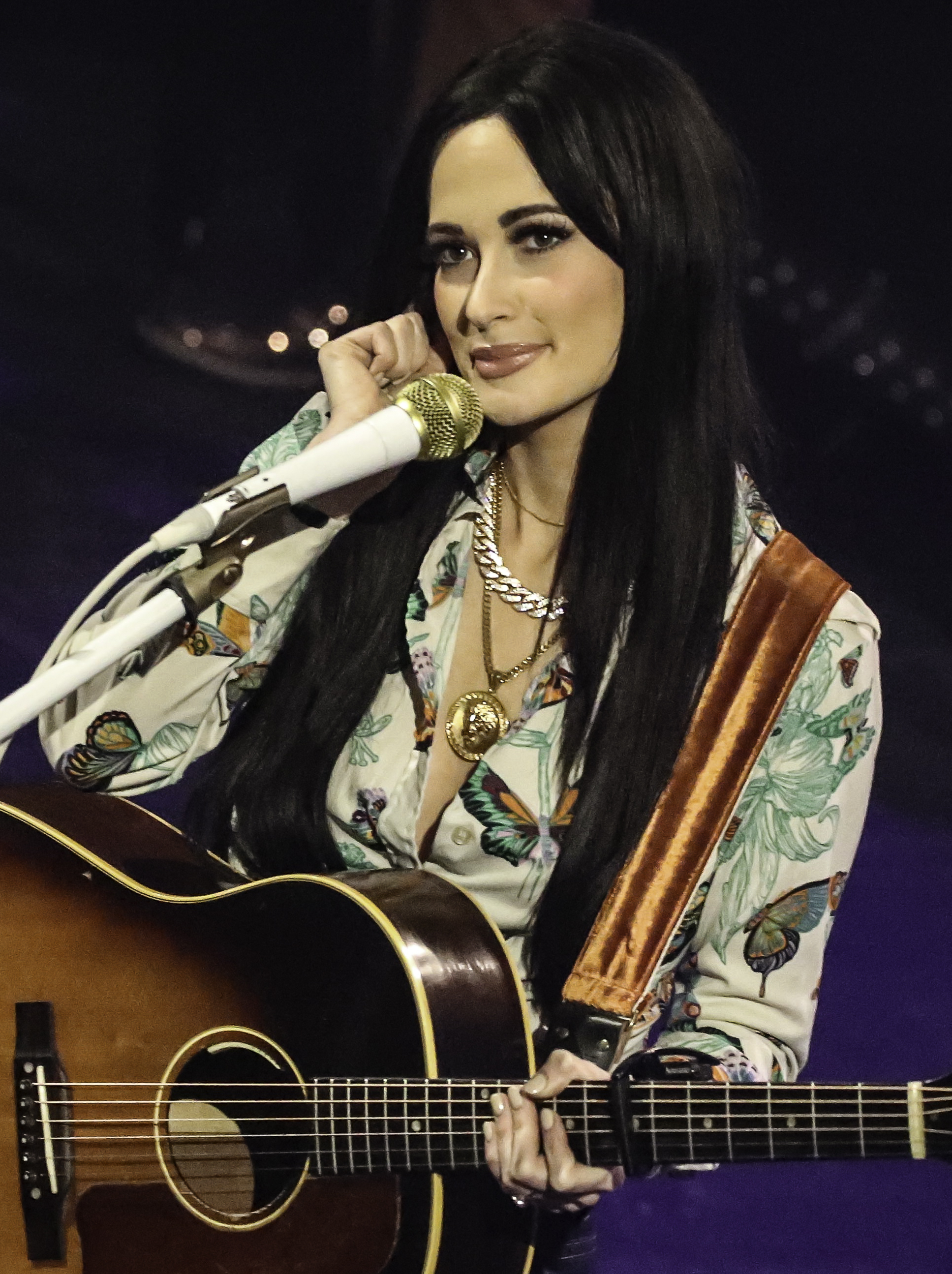
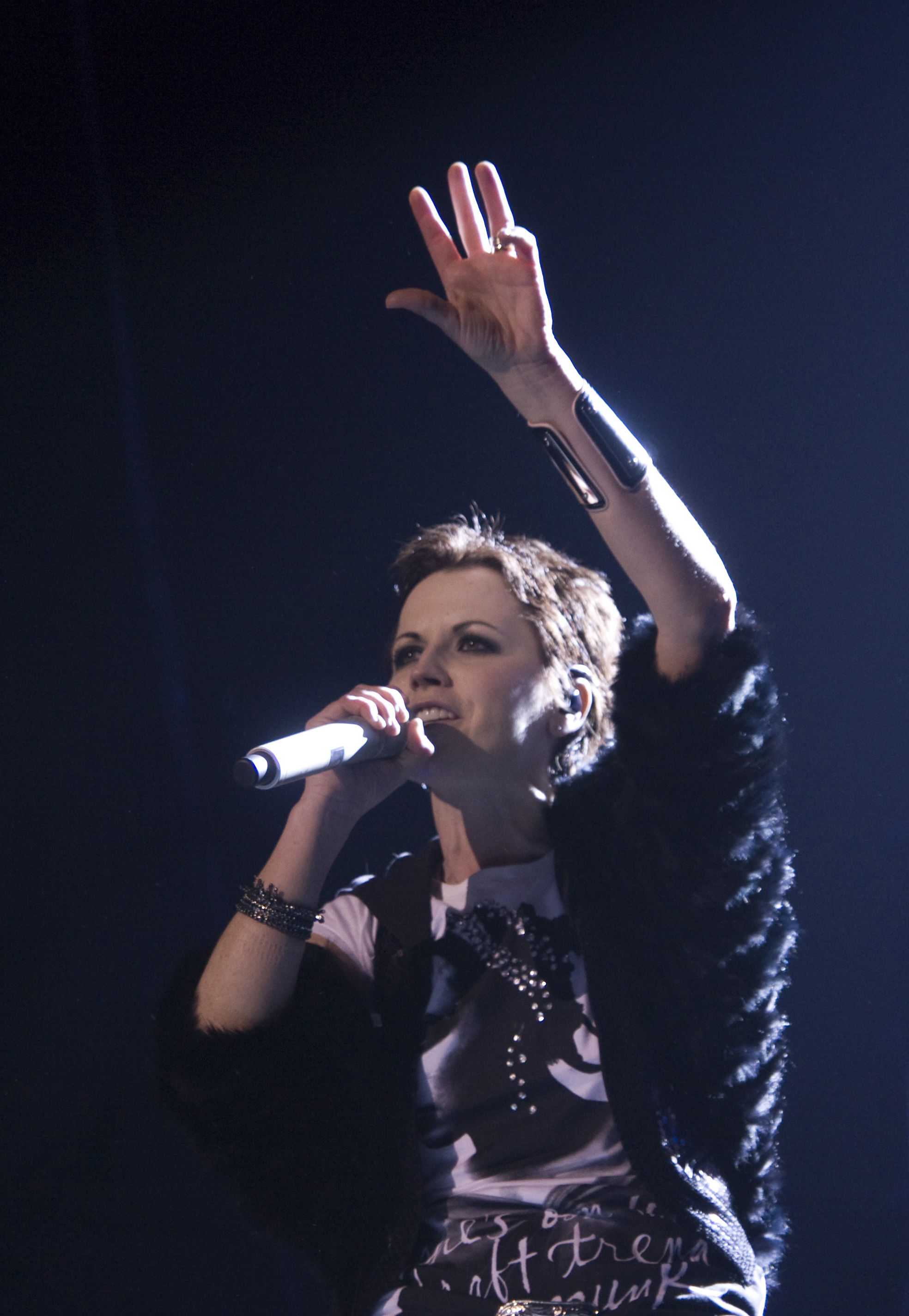
The more minimalistic style of Smitten was informed by sound of country musicians like Kacey Musgraves (left), whereas Heather Baron-Gracie's vocal approach was informed by Dolores O'Riordan of the Cranberries (right).

Pale Waves intended Smitten to be a "romantic, delicate, and feminine" record, whose jangly guitars and powerful choruses reflected the band's "retro-pop and gothic influences". For this reason, many critics have noted sonic similarities between Smitten and the band's debut album, My Mind Makes Noises (2018). Much of the album's sound was informed by country musicians like Kelsea Ballerini and Kacey Musgraves, whose recordings often rely on acoustic guitar and vocals alone. In terms of singing style, Heather Baron-Gracie wanted her vocals to be less intense than those on Unwanted. She therefore gravitated toward the work of Dolores O'Riordan, lead singer of the Cranberries: "I've learned that my voice is more like [O'Riordan]," she noted in an interview. "It wants to be Celtic-sounding, free, and fragile, rather than hitting those solid, huge notes." Critics have further compared the style of Smitten to the music of the Cure, the Sundays, and Cocteau Twins.

The album opens with "Glasgow", which Baron-Gracie described as a track about "leaving someone because you know it's no good for either of you anymore". NME characterised the song as "bittersweet" and "'80s-sounding", with a "soaring" chorus. The second song on the album, "This is Not a Love Song", was written about Baron-Gracie's experience being someone's romantic "experiment": Despite promises that their relationship would last, it ultimately fell apart due her suitor's lack of commitment. Baron-Gracie later told Dork magazine that, while painful, the experience had taught her the importance of being her partner's "first choice". The third track on the record, "Gravity" is a "bright", "dreamy", and "guitar-forward" song that focuses on the "torment of being dragged in different directions by a lover who can't choose between their relationship or their religion". In an interview with The Honey Pop, Baron-Gracie explained: "It's about my relationship that I had with a woman who was struggling with her religion and her sexuality and, in the end, chose Jesus over me." Doran recalled that Baron-Gracie attempted several different iterations of "Gravity" before settling on the version that appeared on the album.

"Thinking About You" is a "tender goth-pop excursion" whose lyrics Baron-Gracie wrote to explore "a situation when someone leaves and you can't quite fully move on yet". The following track "Perfume" explores the excitement of new love and, in the words of Atwood Magazine, the "complexity that comes with the beginning of a relationship". Baron-Gracie initially worried that the song's lyrics were too simple, but the catchiness soon grew on her, and in time she came to liken them to the lyrics of a Spice Girls song. Prominently featuring "jangly, rhythmic guitar" and vocals "reminiscent of The Cranberries", "Perfume" sees "the band's gothic impulses coming to the fore". Several publications – such as Atwood Magazine, NME, and Under the Radar – have further argued that the track evokes the retro-pop sound of the band's early releases. In contrast, "Last Train Home" is a slower, more "contemplative ballad" which Atwood Magazine suggests "reverses the roles from 'Not a Love Song'", by having "the singer [mourn] the demise of a past relationship they weren't able to commit to".

External videos
- Pale Waves – Smitten: The Making Of (Short Film) — Official behind-the-scenes video about the production of Smitten, uploaded by the band to YouTube

"Kiss Me Again" explores fleeting romance, impulsive attraction, and the thrill of a one-night stand. Musically, the track is infused with a "soft punk vibe", with Baron-Gracie describing it as a "really fun energetic pop song". "Miss America", which was originally envisioned as an acoustic song, finds Baron-Gracie reflecting on past mistakes, while "Hate to Hurt You" explores the discomfort and regret that come with causing pain to others. "Seeing Stars", which Dork magazine has described as a "dreamy slice of head-over-heels romance", was the product of the band's months-long struggle to settle on a cohesive "vision" for Smitten. It was only after Baron-Gracie wrote 'Seeing Stars' and presented it to the other members of Pale Waves that the group felt they had found the album's right "sound". "The rest [of the record] kind of followed", Baron-Gracie told Wonderland magazine. Smitten closes with the "Imagination" and "Slow", which Dork contends function as a "one-two [finale] ... delivered with a scrappy alt-rock snarl".

== Title and cover ==
When thinking of a potential title for the album, Baron-Gracie wanted to use a single, definitive word that could capture the record's lyrical, musical, and thematic essence. Since the album centres around queer romance, she ultimately decided on the word "smitten". Baron-Gracie felt that the word not only captured the album's aesthetic but also had a "timeless" quality and a distinctly English charm. When the album title was settled upon, the band then turned their attention to the record's cover. In an interview with Rock Sound Baron-Gracie explained that the final result was conceived by her and her partner, Kelsi Luck:

Originally, I wanted to be lying in the English countryside as the sun was setting. I wanted it to feel quite lonely, but romantic. ... [Luck] creates all the visuals with me, and her ideas are usually way better than mine. She said, 'You can't just have that, that'll be boring. Why don't you have a chandelier hanging above you?' Immediately, I thought that was genius, so we made it happen. Somehow, it looks even better than it did in my head. Out of everything this band has done, the visuals for 'Smitten' are easily my favourite.

== Promotion and singles ==
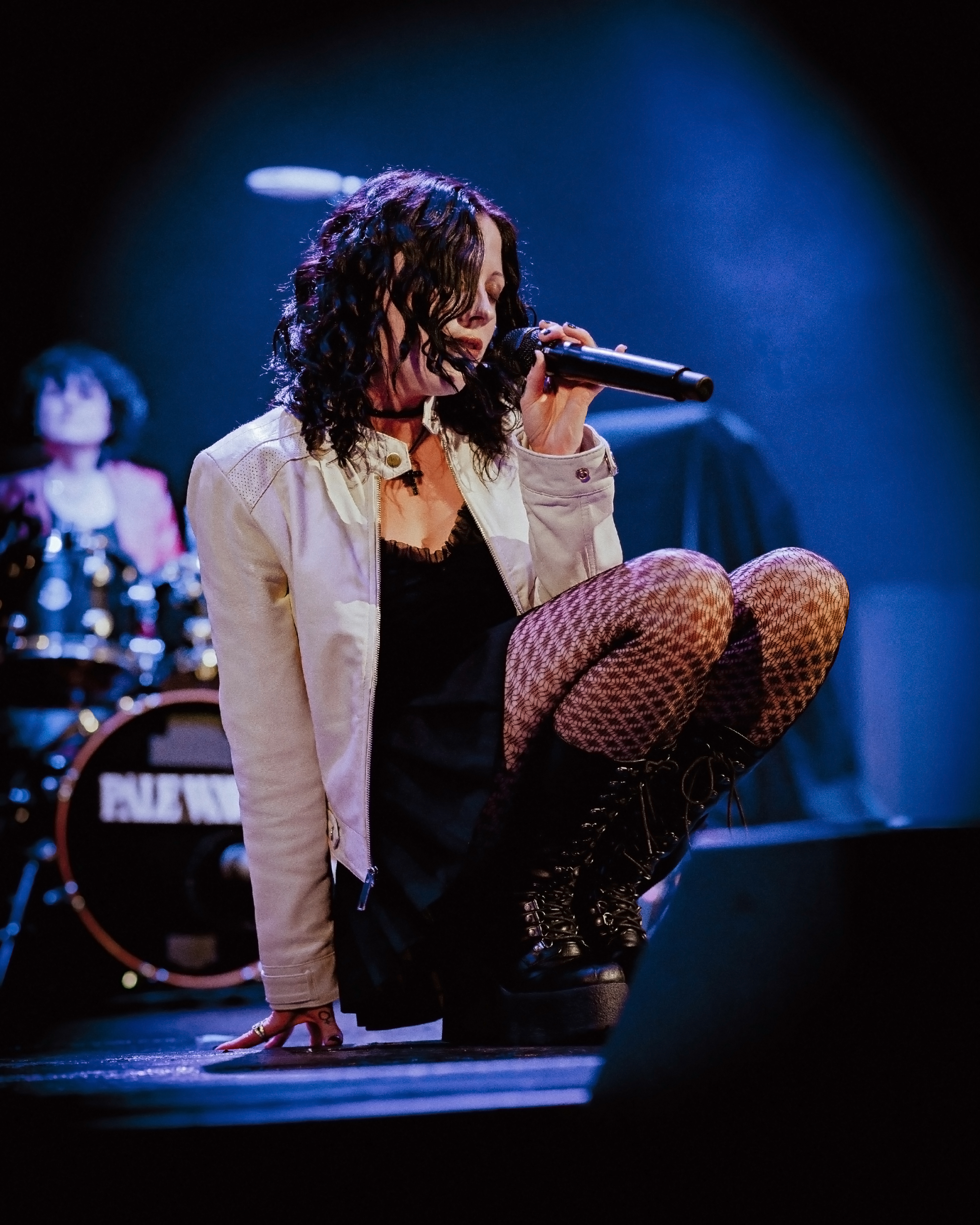
Heather Baron-Gracie, performing at the Wiltern Theatre on July 12, 2024.

On 24 May 2024, Pale Waves performed at the 100 Club in London under the pseudonym "Perfume" as part of Dork magazine's "Dork Night Out" event series; at this concert, they debuted the song of the same name. "Perfume" was later released as the first single from Smitten, debuting on BBC Radio 1's "New Music Show" with Jack Saunders on 12 June 2024. A video for the track, directed by Georgie Cowan-Turner, was also released at this time, alongside an announcement about the album itself. The decision to release "Perfume" as the album's lead single was, according to Baron-Gracie, because "it just was the star of the show from the get-go. Everyone kind of thought the same. Everyone responded so well to 'Perfume' [and it] just felt right. Upon its release, the single peaked at number 13 on Billboard Japan's Hot Overseas chart. Blood Records later issued a limited-edition apple-shaped 7-inch record featuring "Perfume" on the A-side; this record was bundled and sold with a Blood Records variant of Smitten itself.

The second single from the album, "Glasgow", was released on 12 July 2024, along with an accompanying music video, which features Heather Baron-Gracie packing a suitcase and driving off in a car, all while clad in a wedding dress. The video, directed by Baron-Gracie, was filmed on a small budget and employed a production crew of only four people. The third single, "Gravity", was released 15 August 2024. The music video for the song, also directed by Cowan-Turner, focuses on Baron-Gracie and her real-life partner Kelsi Luck "spend[ing] a tender day together". The album's fourth single, "Thinking About You", was released on 13 September 2024, along with a video, directed by Luck. On 24 September 2024, Pale Waves released the audio for "Kiss Me Again" on YouTube.

Pale Waves performed pre-release shows at the Gorilla in Manchester on 24 September and at the HMV Empire venue in Coventry on 25 September. After an official release show at Rough Trade East on 27 September, the band then performed a series of in-house acoustic shows at select record stores in the weeks that followed. To further promote Smitten, Pale Waves organised a headline tour of the UK, which ran from 3 to 17 October 2024. A follow-up "Still Smitten Tour" of the United Kingdom and Ireland from 13 to 30 October 2025 was later announced.

== Critical reception ==
Professional ratings
Aggregate scores
Source	Rating
AnyDecentMusic?	7.6/10
Metacritic	76/100
Review scores
Source	Rating
Clash	8/10
DIY	4/5 stars
Dork	5/5 stars
Hot Press	7/10 stars
Kerrang!	3/5 stars
The Line of Best Fit	7/10 stars
NME	4/5 stars
The Skinny	4/5 stars
Slant Magazine	4/5 stars
The Telegraph	3/5 stars

Smitten was met with mostly positive reviews from critics. At Metacritic, which assigns a weighted average rating out of 100 to reviews from mainstream publications, the release has an average score of 76 based on nine reviews, meaning that it has received "generally favorable reviews". Fellow music aggregator AnyDecentMusic? likewise gave the album an average score of 7.6/10, based on ten reviews.

In a review for Dork magazine, Jamie Muir awarded Smitten five out of five stars and called it "an album of soaring ambition and unstoppable pop hooks ready to be the go-to coming-of-age album of 2024". DIY magazine argued that Smitten marks a return to the band's 80s-inspired synth-pop sound while also showcasing a more autobiographical approach to songwriting when compared to their previous work. The magazine ultimately gave the record four out of five stars. Josh Abraham of Clash wrote that "some may see this body of work and think the band have gone back to their roots, and others can see they are trying new soundscapes and lyricism, for this writer, it's both. That is ultimately the beauty of Smitten." Edwin McFee of Hot Press wrote that the album was "brimming with bangers" and that "fans of '90s indie-pop will fall head over heels for" the record.

Callum Foulds of The Line of Best Fit awarded the album seven out of ten stars, writing that "Smitten is Pale Waves returning to the sound that made them such an enigmatic new face in British music. What is different this time around is the sharpness at which the band pulls off this same sound. ... [The record] is the sound of a band infatuated with their art, ready for the future, and excited to be a part of it." Ali Shutler of NME magazine awarded the album four out of five stars. Shutler appreciated that while Smitten took inspiration from other records, it still had an identity of its own. Dylan Tuck of The Skinny awarded the album four out of five stars and complimented the record for pleasantly synthesising the "silken synth-pop" style of My Mind Makes Noises with the "punkish-pop" that characterised Who Am I? and Unwanted.

Emma Wilkes of Kerrang awarded the album three out of five stars, writing that with this record, "the Manchester quartet have found a way to own their individuality. Gone is the slightly sickly Avril Lavigne worship of 2021's Who Am I? and 2022's Unwanted, replaced by a velvety, dreamy alt. pop sound that feels both more natural and more distinct". At the same time, Wilkes critiqued the album for its saccharine lyrical content and an "occasionally ... simplistic" sound. Similarly, Tom Williams of The Telegraph wrote in a three-out-of-five star review that Smitten is Pale Waves "as you've always known them; painting big feelings in broad brush strokes, wearing their influences on their sleeve and prioritising power chords and festival-ready hooks over nuance and specificity. ... But too often, the band lean on simplistic similes [or] metaphors ... that keep them at arm's length. Four albums in, the band are still no closer to honing in on a sound that's recognizably theirs."

=== Accolades ===
Publication	Accolade	Rank	Ref.
Dork	Albums of the Year (2024)	50	

== Commercial performance ==
Smitten was released on 27 September 2024 by the independent record label Dirty Hit on vinyl, CD, cassette, and as a digital download. In addition to the standard LP release, Dirty Hit also partnered with Rough Trade, HMV, Blood Records, and a number of independent UK record stores to a series of limited color variants.

Upon its release, Smitten debuted at number 13 on the UK Albums Chart (Official Charts Company). The album also charted at number three on the Independent Albums Chart, number five on the Official Record Store Chart, and number four on the Official Vinyl Albums Chart. On the Scottish Albums Chart, Smitten debuted at number four, making it the band's fourth consecutive Top 10 album in Scotland. In Japan, the album peaked at number 83 on Billboard Japan's Download Albums chart.

== Track listing ==
Smitten track listing
No.	Title	Writer(s)	Producer(s)	Length
1.	"Glasgow"	Heather Baron-Gracie; Simon Oscroft	Oscroft; Iain Berryman	3:34
2.	"Not a Love Song"	Baron-Gracie	Berryman	2:47
3.	"Gravity"	Baron-Gracie; Hugo Silvani	Silvani; Berryman	3:35
4.	"Thinking About You"	Baron-Gracie; Oscroft	Oscroft; Berryman	3:07
5.	"Perfume"	Baron-Gracie; Oscroft	Oscroft; Berryman	3:39
6.	"Last Train Home"	Baron-Gracie; Silvani	Silvani; Berryman	3:22
7.	"Kiss Me Again"	Baron-Gracie; Oscroft	Oscroft; Berryman	2:55
8.	"Miss America"	Baron-Gracie; Silvani; Benjamin Francis Leftwich	Silvani; Berryman	3:07
9.	"Hate to Hurt You"	Baron-Gracie; Silvani; Leftwich; Edward James Carlile	Berryman	3:06
10.	"Seeing Stars"	Baron-Gracie; Oscroft; Ciara Doran; Sierra Deaton	Oscroft; Berryman	3:38
11.	"Imagination"	Baron-Gracie; Silvani	Silvani; Berryman	3:22
12.	"Slow"	Baron-Gracie; Oscroft	Oscroft	4:04
Total length:				40:16

Bonus tracks

Japanese release
No.	Title	Writer(s)	Length
13.	"Anna" (Demo)	Pale Waves	2:24
Total length:			42:40

== Personnel ==
Credits adapted from the liner notes.

Pale Waves

- Heather Baron-Gracie – vocals, guitar
- Ciara Doran – drums
- Hugo Silvani – guitars, bass, synths, programming
- Charlie Wood – bass

Additional musicians

- Simon Oscroft – guitars, bass guitar, drums, synths, programming
- Ian Berryman – guitars, synths, percussion
- Kirsty Mangan – strings

Technical

- Simon Oscroft – production
- Iain Berryman – production
- Hugo Silvani – production
- Oli Jacobs – mixing
- Fraser Latimer – mixing assistance
- Ruairí O'Flaherty – mastering

== Charts ==
Chart performance for Smitten
Chart (2024)	Peak position
Download Albums (Billboard Japan)	83
Scottish Albums (Official Charts)	4
UK Albums (Official Charts)	13
UK Independent Albums (Official Charts)	3
UK Official Record Store Chart (OCC)	5
UK Official Vinyl Albums Chart (OCC)	4

== Release history ==
Release history and formats for Smitten
Country	Date	Format	Variant	Label	Catalog no.	Ref.
Various	12 June 2024	CD	Standard	Dirty Hit	DH2067	
Various	12 June 2024	LP	Burgundy variant	Dirty Hit	DH2059	
Various	12 June 2024	LP	Blood Records variant (Note: This release shared the same catalog number as the burgundy variant and was pressed on "gold marble" vinyl. It also was sold with a bonus apple-shaped 7" record featuring "Perfume" and a demo of "Miss America".)	Dirty Hit	DH2059	
Various	12 June 2024	LP	Band store variant	Dirty Hit	DH2062	
Various	12 June 2024	LP	"Indies" variant	Dirty Hit	DH2063	
Various	12 June 2024	LP	HMV variant	Dirty Hit	DH2064	
Various	12 June 2024	LP	Spotify "Fans First" variant	Dirty Hit	DH02071	
Various	12 June 2024	Cassette	Standard	Dirty Hit	DH2070	
Various	12 June 2024	Digital download	—	Dirty Hit	—	
Various	12 June 2024	Streaming	—	Dirty Hit	—	
