= Eighteen (Pale Waves song) =

Single by Pale Waves

from the album My Mind Makes Noises
- Released: 24 July 2018
- Recorded: 2018
- Genre: Synth-pop
- Length: 3:00
- Label: Dirty Hit
- Songwriters: Ciara Doran; Heather Baron-Gracie
- Producers: Jonathan Gilmore; Ciara Doran (add.)

Pale Waves singles chronology
"Noises" (2018)	"Eighteen" (2018)	"Black" (2018)

Music video
- "Eighteen" on YouTube

"Eighteen" is a song by English indie pop band Pale Waves from their debut studio album, My Mind Makes Noises (2018). It was released as the album's fifth single on 24 July 2018 by Dirty Hit.

== Release ==
The song premiered on BBC Radio 1 show as Annie Mac's "Hottest Record in the World" on 24 July 2018. The band also revealed on the same show that their debut studio album was titled My Mind Makes Noises and would be released on 14 September 2018. "Eighteen" was featured on BBC Radio 1's official playlist throughout August and September 2018. The single reached the A-list in the week of 7 September 2018, a first for the band.

The song was a success in Japan, marking the first time the band have charted outside of Europe. The single reached number 55 on the Billboard Japan Hot 100 and number two on the Japan Hot Overseas chart. As of July 2022, "Eighteen" has been streamed 11.24 million times on Spotify.

== Critical reception ==
Will Richards of DIY magazine gave the song a positive review, calling it the band's "most direct pop song yet", and also praising the chorus as "the best Pale Waves have ever written." Writing for Dork, Stephen Ackroyd was similarity positive about the track, praising it for being a great introduction to the album; he wrote the track "audibly throbs, revving its engines on the starting line." Rania Aniftos of Billboard called the track a "glistening pop tune", writing: "It's truly an electronic bop that encompasses the age it's titled after."

== Music video ==
The music video for "Eighteen" was directed by Adam Powell and premiered on 22 August 2018. The video follows Baron-Gracie as she goes on a road trip across the United States. Footage of Baron-Gracie walking through a forest, staying in a motel, visiting a diner, and driving in her car. Interspersed with this footage are brief and intimate shots of Baron-Gracie and an unseen lover. While talking to Taylor Henderson of Pride Magazine, Baron-Gracie explained that the video for "Eighteen" is "all about [her] sort of looking for that [unseen lover] or trying to find that person." Initially, the video did not feature the quick cuts to Baron-Gracie and the aforementioned lover, as the artist explained:

In "Eighteen", there's a moment where you see me with another person ... [That is] actually my stylist. It wasn't intentional. ... On the day, we filmed the whole entire video, and then we looked at the video and thought, "Hey, this isn't going to make sense. You need to see me with somebody for this video to make sense." ... We were like, "Who can we put in the video?" ... And then I was like, "Patty will you be in the video?" And you know, she's this straight, Italian, amazing woman, and she was like, "OK, I will, but I don't really want to!" So she's in the video.

As of January 2024, the video has been viewed over 2.5 million times on YouTube.

== Track listing ==
Digital download
No.	Title	Length
1.	"Eighteen"	3:00

== Release ==
As of May 2024, "Eighteen" has been streamed 13.0 million times on Spotify.

== Charts ==
Chart performance for "Eighteen"
Chart (2018)	Peak position
Japan Hot 100 (Billboard Japan)	55
Japan Hot Overseas (Billboard Japan)	2
UK Radio Airplay Top 50 (Radiomonitor)	46

== Release history ==
Release dates and formats for "Eighteen"
Region	Date	Format	Label	Ref.
Various	24 July 2018	Digital download	Dirty Hit	
