= Jealousy (Pale Waves song) =

Single by Pale Waves

from the album Unwanted
- Released: 27 June 2022
- Recorded: 2021
- Genre: Pop-punk
- Length: 3:12
- Label: Dirty Hit
- Songwriters: Heather Baron-Gracie; Whakaio Taahi
- Producer: Zakk Cervini

Pale Waves singles chronology
"Reasons to Live" (2022)	"Jealousy" (2022)	"The Hard Way" (2022)

Music video
- "Jealousy" on YouTube

"Jealousy" is a pop-punk song by the English band Pale Waves, released on 27 June 2022 as the third single from the album Unwanted (2022). The song was written by Pale Waves's frontwoman Heather Baron-Gracie and the singer-songwriter Whakaio Taahi. A music video for the song, directed by the visual artist Vasilisa Forbes was also released.

== Music and lyrics ==
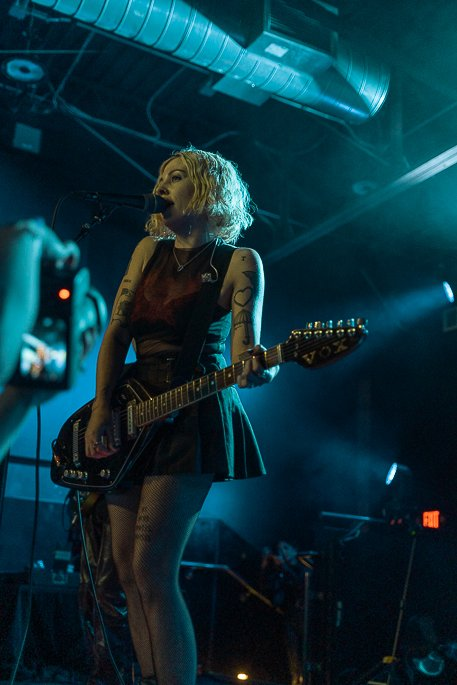
"Jealousy" was co-written by Pale Waves's guitarist and vocalist, Heather Baron-Gracie. (M. Sean McClintock, Neon Sagwagon)

"Jealousy" was written by Heather Baron-Gracie (lead singer and guitarist for Pale Waves) and Whakaio Taahi (a singer-songwriter who had previously been the lead guitarist in the band Tonight Alive). When discussing the album with BBC Radio 1's Clara Amfo, Baron-Gracie revealed that, initially, the song was one that not everyone in the band liked at first: "I think it was maybe the third or fourth song that we wrote for [Unwanted]. And at first, when we had the demo, not everyone was really into it that much except me. And I really pushed for it ... I was like, 'No, we need to record this properly!' And we did. And now I would say it's one of, if not everyone's favorite. So always go with your gut; always go with your instinct."

In terms of genre, "Jealousy" has been described both as a pop-punk and an alternative rock track; critics have also likened the song to the work of Alanis Morissette, Avril Lavigne, and The Subways. In a description of the track's soundscape, Alternative Press wrote that "each verse of 'Jealousy' is akin to a blade grinding against a whetstone. The vocals are just barely covered by the gritty tones of their accompaniment. When the chorus comes around, [Baron-Gracie's] voice has obtained a razor's edge, and every other sonic element is cleft by her enthusiastic delivery."

The lyrics to "Jealousy" – which are sung from the perspective of a possessive lover who is cognizant of her behavior – were inspired by Baron-Gracie's personal feelings about the titular emotion: "I love a bit of jealousy – not too much, but just enough." When speaking with Amfo, Baron-Gracie expanded on these sentiments: "I just embrace my craziness and sometimes you just have to let it loose, and 'Jealousy' was that for me. ... Yeah, I ... think the right amount of jealousy is healthy. Like, I would want my person to get jealous. I wouldn't want them to just be like, so cool all the time. I'd be like, 'No, you need to be jealous about this,' you know?"

== Music video ==
Heather Baron-Gracie singing from behind a chain-link fence and while hanging from a chain swing in the "Jealousy" music video, directed by Vasilisa Forbes. Baron-Gracie likened these visuals to a "Helmet Lang or Calvin Klein advert."

A music video for "Jealousy" was directed by the visual artist Vasilisa Forbes (who also directed the video for the band's earlier single, "Lies"), and it was released on 9 May 2022. The video, which is filmed in black and white, features the band performing the song against a minimalist background. Baron-Gracie is also shown singing from behind a chain-link fence, and while hanging from a chain swing. In an interview with MTV News, Baron-Gracie described Forbes's treatment of the song as "one of [her] favorite videos" that the band has made, and she likened its visual aesthetic to "a Helmet Lang or Calvin Klein advert."

As of February 2024, the video has been viewed 0.8 million times on YouTube.

== Release ==
In early 2022, prior to the single's official release, Pale Waves performed "Jealousy" at many of their live shows, whereupon it became a "fan-favorite". The song was officially released to radio on 27 June 2022, debuting on BBC Radio 1's Future Sounds show.

Jason Lipshutz of Billboard magazine named "Jealousy" one of the "10 Cool New Pop Songs to Get You Through The Week" and applauded the song's stage-friendly sound: "From the razor-sharp guitar riff to the 'la-la-la' hook to the declaration 'Jealousy’s my best friend!,' Pale Waves' latest is going to sound mighty onstage this season." Kerrang! magazine selected "Jealousy" for inclusion on their inaugural "Kerrang! Chart", writing that the song's "opening has a strut that says, 'Look here, you, I'm a very big opening to a song that's only getting bigger from here.'"

As of May 2024, "Jealousy" has been streamed 7.3 million times on Spotify.

== Personnel ==
Credits adapted from the liner notes of Unwanted.

Pale Waves

- Heather Baron-Gracie – vocals, guitar
- Ciara Doran – drums, synths, programming
- Hugo Silvani – guitar
- Charlie Wood – bass guitar

Technical

- Zakk Cervini – production

== Release history ==
Release history and formats for "Jealousy"
Country	Date	Format	Label	Ref.
Various	27 June 2022	Digital download, streaming	Dirty Hit	
