= Kiss (Pale Waves song) =

Single by Pale Waves

from the album My Mind Makes Noises
- Released: 15 May 2018
- Recorded: 2018
- Genre: Dream pop Jangle pop
- Length: 3:10
- Label: Dirty Hit
- Songwriter(s): Ciara Doran & Heather Baron-Gracie

Pale Waves singles chronology
"Heavenly" (2018)	"Kiss" (2018)	"Noises" (2018)

Music video
- "Kiss" on YouTube

"Kiss" is a song by English indie pop band Pale Waves from their debut studio album, My Mind Makes Noises (2018). It was released as the album's third single on 15 May 2018 by Dirty Hit.

== Composition ==
"Kiss" is one of the older compositions on My Mind Makes Noises (2018), having been written when Pale Waves members Heather Baron-Gracie and Ciara Doran were students at BIMM Manchester. In one class, Baron-Gracie had been tasked with "writ[ing] a soundtrack to a film", and so she spliced scenes from John Hughes's The Breakfast Club (1985) down into a trailer-length video and scored it; Doran and Baron-Gracie later took this score and fleshed it out into what would become "Kiss". In a conversation with Clash magazine, Baron-Gracie described "Kiss" as "a naive song" because its lyrics were written when she was "try[ing to] get into the mindset of being a songwriter for a band".

Musically, "Kiss" is a song in the key of E major that is played at a tempo of 143 beats per minute. In terms of genre, it has been described as both "jangle-rock" and "dream pop", and its overall sonic nature has been likened to the work of the Cure and Robert Smith.

== Release ==
The song was mistakenly leaked via Spotify on 27 April 2018, but it was taken down shortly after. "Kiss" was released worldwide on 15 May 2018 as a download and through online streaming services. The song was named Hottest Record in the World on release day getting its world premier on Annie Mac's BBC Radio 1 show. Kiss was also featured on Radio 1's B-list on their official playlist throughout July 2018.

== Reception ==
Critical reception to "Kiss" has been generally positive upon release. Robin Murray of Clash described the song as "a bright, buoyant summertime melter, blessed with a softest but more accurate of punches" and wrote that it's "perfect for those rainy British summertime days [as] it's got a heart of gold but a melancholic after-taste". Samantha Maine of NME wrote that the track is an "instant pop banger that sees the band build on their ability to craft catchy choruses". Katie Cameron of Paste magazine wrote that the song's "glittery ... hooks" and its "lively pop beats" are "offset by frontwoman Heather Baron-Gracie’s melancholy".

Steven Ward of Grimy Goods described the song as being replete with "lush hooks and electric anthemics", and he argued that it was built around "Baron-Gracie’s gorgeous cries", which he described as the "centerpiece of the entire affair". Dork magazine called the single a "banger" in their review of the track and stated: "It shimmers in the sparkle of Pale Waves' 80s pop glitter ball". The magazine summarised their thoughts by writing, "With a timeless quality, it's packing a chorus straight out of the Big Book Of Anthems, it's dark heart juxtaposed by a playful desire to lark about in the fast lanes". Upon the release of "Kiss", Joshua Copperman of Spin magazine wrote that the track "isn't a drop in quality, though it doesn't necessarily raise the bar either". While critiquing the song for employing the same musical and lyrical approach as past Pale Waves’s tracks, Copperman wrote that "Kiss" succeeds because "the emotions at the center come off as genuine".

== Music video ==
The music video for "Kiss", directed by Robert Hales, was released on 14 June 2018 through the band's official Vevo account on YouTube. The video was filmed in black and white and focuses on the band performing in a large warehouse while black paint leaks from the walls. In a post announcing its release, Steven Ward of Grimy Goods wrote that the video "employs all of [Heather Baron-Gracie's] charm in true 80s fashion with some pretty charming dead-pan close-ups of [her] striking facial expressions and head-swinging". As of February 2024, the video has been viewed over 2.8 million times on YouTube.

== Track listing ==
All lyrics are written by Pale Waves; all music is composed by Pale Waves.

Download and streaming
No.	Title	Length
1.	"Kiss"	3:10

== Charts ==
Chart (2018)	Peak position
Belgium (Ultratip Bubbling Under Flanders)	34

== Release history ==
Release history and formats for "Kiss"
Country	Date	Format	Label	Ref.
Various	15 May 2018	Digital download, streaming	Dirty Hit	
