= Noises (song) =

Single by Pale Waves

from the album My Mind Makes Noises
- Released: 28 June 2018
- Recorded: 2018
- Length: 4:06
- Label: Dirty Hit
- Songwriter(s): Ciara Doran & Heather Baron-Gracie

Pale Waves singles chronology
"Kiss" (2018)	"Noises" (2018)	"Eighteen" (2018)

Music video
- "Noises" on YouTube

"Noises" is a song by English indie pop band Pale Waves from their debut studio album, My Mind Makes Noises (2018). It was released as the album's fourth single on 28 June 2018 by Dirty Hit.

== Composition ==
Lyrically, "Noises" focuses on mental health—in particular, struggles with body image and self-esteem. In an interview with Dork magazine, Pale Waves's frontwoman Heather Baron-Gracie explained:

["Noises" is] such an important song to me. I wrote it when I was going through a difficult time. I was struggling with how I looked and how my body was. A lot of our fans are young, they’re growing up, and they’re figuring out who they want to be. It was important for me to write a song on self-esteem and mental health issues because I know people struggle with that. They need a reason to escape that nightmare in their head. They need someone else to say, ‘You know what? It’s okay "cos I’m feeling the same". ... I know how some people see me onstage ... They see how I dress and how I am sometimes, and I know they think "You know what, she's confident and believes in herself", but I think the people that try and present themselves as the most confident are always the ones that lack that assurance and self-esteem. I've struggled with that growing up and still do to this day. It's slowly getting better, but ... I wish I had "Noises" as a song in my life when I was seventeen. It would have helped me.

Ciara Doran, the band's drummer, later revealed in a BBC interview that they had had the first line of the song (i.e., "My mind makes noises", from which the album derives its name) tattooed on their arm: "It's my favourite lyric," Doran explained. "That's the most personal song [Baron-Gracie]'s ever written. I love that song. That's all about Heather's world".

== Release ==
"Noises" was released as the fourth single from My Mind Makes Noises on 28 June 2018, debuting on Zane Lowe's Beats1 radio show.

== Music video ==
In the video for "Noises", Heather Baron-Gracie portrays four distinct characters, each dressed in a unique style.

On 20 July 2018, the band released a video for "Noises". Directed by Gareth Phillips, this video sees Baron-Gracie performing as four distinct characters, each dressed in a unique style. As of April 2024, the video has been viewed over 3.9 million times on YouTube.

== Release history ==
Release history and formats for "Noises"
Country	Date	Format	Label	Ref.
Various	28 June 2018	Digital download, streaming	Dirty Hit	
