= Perfume (Pale Waves song) =

- Apple-shaped Blood Records bonus 7", featuring "Perfume" on the a-side

Single by Pale Waves

from the album Smitten
- Released: 12 June 2024
- Recorded: 2024
- Length: 3:39
- Label: Dirty Hit
- Songwriters: Heather Baron-Gracie; Simon Oscroft
- Producers: Simon Oscroft; Iain Berryman

Pale Waves singles chronology
"Clean" (2022)	"Perfume" (2024)	"Glasgow" (2024)

Music video
- "Perfume" on YouTube

"Perfume" is a song by the English band Pale Waves, released on 12 June 2024 as the lead single from their album Smitten (2024). The song was written by Pale Waves's frontwoman Heather Baron-Gracie and producer Simon Oscroft. A music video for the song, directed by Georgie Cowan-Turner was also released. The single later peaked at number 13 on Billboard Japan's "Hot Overseas" single chart.

== Music and lyrics ==
"Perfume" explores the excitement of new love and the "complexity that comes with the beginning of a relationship". Baron-Gracie initially worried the lyrics for "Perfume" were too simple, but she later embraced their catchiness, likening them to the lyrics of the Spice Girls.

Prominently featuring "jangly, rhythmic guitar" and vocals "reminiscent of The Cranberries", "Perfume" sees "the band's gothic impulses coming to the fore". Several publications – such as Atwood Magazine, NME, and Under the Radar – have further argued that the track evokes the retro-pop sound of the band's early releases.

== Music video ==
A video for "Perfume", directed by Georgie Cowan-Turner, was released on 12 June 2024.

== Release ==
On 24 May 2024, Pale Waves performed at the 100 Club in London under the pseudonym "Perfume" as part of Dork magazine's "Dork Night Out" event series; at this concert, they debuted the song of the same name. "Perfume" was eventually released as the lead single for Smitten, debuting on BBC Radio 1 on 12 June 2024. The decision to release "Perfume" as the album's lead single was, according to Baron-Gracie, because "it just was the star of the show from the get-go. Everyone kind of thought the same. Everyone responded so well to 'Perfume' [and it] just felt right.

Upon its release, the single peaked at number 13 on Billboard Japan's Hot Overseas chart. Blood Records later issued a limited-edition apple-shaped 7" record (bundled with a special variant of Smitten) that featured "Perfume" on the a-side. The single later charted at number 17 on the UK Physical Sales Chart, number 12 on the UK Vinyl Chart, and number 91 on the UK Singles Sales Chart.

== Personnel ==
Credits adapted from the Apple Music release.

Pale Waves

- Heather Baron-Gracie – vocals, guitar
- Ciara Doran – drums, synths, programming
- Hugo Silvani – guitar
- Charlie Wood – bass guitar

Technical

- Simon Oscroft – production
- Ian Berryman – production
- Oli Jacobs – mixing
- Fraser Latimer – mixing assistance

== Charts ==
Chart performance for "Perfume"
Chart (2024)	Peak position
Hot Overseas (Billboard Japan)	13
UK Physical Sales Chart (OCC)	17
UK Vinyl Chart (OCC)	12

== Release history ==
Release history and formats for "Perfume"
Country	Date	Format	Label	Ref.
Various	12 June 2024	Digital download, streaming	Dirty Hit	
Various	27 September 2024	7" LP	Dirty Hit	
