= Vasilisa Forbes =

Vasilisa Forbes (born Moscow, 1992) is a film director and visual artist, known predominantly for the War on Diesel billboard series and WAX film and visual art series. Vasilisa started her career in photography for Super Super Magazine before moving on to direct music videos and short films.

== Early life ==
Born in Moscow, Russia, Vasilisa moved to London, UK, aged 5 with her mother. She grew up in Wandsworth before moving to Tower Hamlets (borough of East London) aged 16 to pursue a career in shotting and hoodratting within the vicinity of Shoreditch. Vasilisa started her career in the arts early, at age 13 with ballet at the Royal Academy of Dance and acting at LAMDA. She joined the band FrankMusik as a session synth musician at age 15, after meeting the musician through her Myspace, where she made DJ playlists with artists like Spoek Mathambo before being expelled from the group for being too young to tour. Vasilisa took an internship with Super Super Magazine around this time which initiated her career in photography and film. She was part of the Soho nightlife at Circus Club Soho Revue Bar where she took photographs, publishing a book called In Silence Are Shadows which was reported on by Dazed & Confused magazine for their Teenage Takeover issue in 2009.

== Career ==
Following her start with Super Super during the time of editor Alex Kazemi, Vasilisa went on to create content (photography, articles and interviews) for high-end fashion publications I-D magazine, Dazed and Vice magazine. Her visual arts and billboard series Waxchick, commissioned originally by Annin Arts went on show in London on outdoor public billboards in November 2014. Her Waxchick Prints are sold through Thank You Editions. The Waxchick Film, made for the series in collaboration with director Rory Mckellar was screened at multiple festivals including East End Film Festival, London Short Film Festival and at the ICA. The Waxchick series also featured on the cover of Hungry Eye Journal, selling out in stockists.

Following her success with the WAX film, Vasilisa moved to moving image. She currently directs music videos including the video for Navin Kundra's 'Tear It Up' as well as other recent releases in 2016 such as The Souls 'Fighting in the Moonlight'. Forbes also directed the videos for the Pale Waves single "Lies" and "Jealousy".

As a performer, Vasilisa is represented by Simon and How.

== Awards ==
- Sony WPO (World Photography Awards) Commended Photographer 2011 and Shortlisted Photographer 2012
- Bar-Tur Award Shortlisted Photographer 2011
- Debut Contemporary Artist Awards Shortlisted 2012
- Aesthetica Arts Prize Listed 2013
- Shorts on Tap - Women's Film Winner 2015

== In popular culture ==
- Vasilisa starred in the viral web and TV series 'Dalston Superstars' with Vice Magazine in 2011.
- Vasilisa featured on the cover of Photography Journal Hungry Eye on the Second Issue Third Volume with her Waxchick Series, which subsequently sold out and was reputed as the 'loudest image to grace the cover of Hungry Eye'
- A short Documentary about Vasilisa Forbes was released as part of 'A Women's World' TV Series on RAI Storia produced by Shorts On Tap

== Filmography ==
=== Short films ===
Year	Film	Role	Awards and nominations
2016	Wax	Director	East End Film Festival June 2016 - Screened, Nominated; London Short Film Festival 2016: ICA; Hackney Picturehouse - Screened, Nominated; ICA Jan 2016 - Fashion Film Identity - Top Four; In House Festival - Screened, Nominated; ICA June 2016 - 'Something Else' Film Live; Shorts On Tap - Winner; Library London December 2014 Wax - Screened; Library London November 2015 Wax Live + guests - Screened; Kobini Digital Premiere 6 Countries - Premiere, International; Karst Artist Films - Screened; Deptford Theatre Women in Revolt - Screened; Parallel Vienna - Screened, Nominated
2015	Other	Director / Star	Pilot (Web Series)
2014	Luke And Vas	Director / Star	Pilot [London Live]
2013	Arc	Director	Digital Release

=== Music videos ===
Year	Artist	Track
2016	Alcatrz	"F Your Feelings"
	Lishi	"Monster Kids"
	The Souls	"Fighting in the Moonlight"
	The Souls	"Cry"
	Pray TV	"Great Plans"
	Living Dead Girl	"Simulation"
	Alcatrz	"Mean It"
	Alcatrz	"Whatever"
	Navin Kundra	"Tear it Up"
	Nightgeist & Suddi Ruval	"Some Kinda Feeling"
	St Rose	"Keep it Up"
	BRO	"Pull Up Selecta"
	Ashley Shakur	"Star Crossed"
2022	Pale Waves	"Lies"
2022	Pale Waves	"Jealousy"
