= My Mind Makes Noises =

Album by Pale Waves

Studio album by Pale Waves
- Released: 14 September 2018
- Recorded: 2016–2018
- Genres: Indie pop; alternative rock; synth-pop; pop
- Length: 50:10
- Labels: Dirty Hit; Interscope
- Producers: George Daniel; Ciara Doran; Jonathan Gilmore; Matthew Healy (Note: Ciara Doran provided additional production on all tracks, and Gilmore provided additional production on tracks 2 and 10.)

Pale Waves chronology
All the Things I Never Said (2018)	My Mind Makes Noises (2018)	Who Am I? (2021)

Alternative cover
- HMV exclusive cover

Singles from My Mind Makes Noises
- 1. "There's a Honey" Released: 20 February 2017; 2. "Television Romance" Released: 16 August 2017; 3. "Kiss" Released: 15 May 2018; 4. "Noises" Released: 28 June 2018; 5. "Eighteen" Released: 24 July 2018; 6. "Black" Released: 14 August 2018; 7. "One More Time" Released: 13 September 2018

My Mind Makes Noises is the debut studio album by English indie pop band Pale Waves, released on 14 September 2018 by the independent record label Dirty Hit. With the exception of the album's singles "There's a Honey" and "Television Romance", the songs on My Mind Makes Noises were produced by Jonathan Gilmore, with Pale Waves' drummer, Ciara Doran, providing additional production. The 1975's George Daniel and Matty Healy produced "Television Romance" and There's a Honey" (although the songs were remixed by Gilmore and Doran for inclusion on the album).

All of the songs on My Mind Makes Noises were co-written by Doran and the band's lead vocalist and guitarist, Heather Baron-Gracie. Sonically, the record was inspired largely by pop music from the 1980s, with many of the tracks making use of synthesizers and jangly guitars. The album's lyrics are melancholic and often dark, focusing on the pain of heartbreak, young love that is now lost, mental health, body image, unwanted romantic attention, and the death of beloved family members.

My Mind Makes Noises received generally favourable reviews, according to aggregators like AnyDecentMusic? and Metacritic. Many critics called the record a strong debut, applauding the catchiness of the record's songs and the affectivity of the songs' lyrics. The album's sonic dimension was also complimented by critics, although some reviewers did feel that the record's sound was too derivative of the 1975. Upon its release, the album debuted at number eight on the UK Albums Chart and at number one on Billboard's Heatseekers Albums chart. My Mind Makes Noises was supported by seven singles: "There's a Honey", "Television Romance", "Kiss", "Noises", "Eighteen", "Black", and "One More Time".

== Production ==
=== Background ===
Pale Waves formed in 2014 when the drummer Ciara Doran met the vocalist and guitarist Heather Baron-Gracie while the two were attending the British and Irish Modern Music Institute (BIMM) in Manchester. The two began collaborating on musical projects and eventually dubbed themselves "Pale Waves" – a reference to a painting that Baron-Gracie's grandmother had made of a ship at sea. Doran and Baron-Gracie eventually enlisted second guitarist Hugo Silvani and bassist Charlie Wood, and in 2015, the group recorded demos for the songs "The Tide" and "Heavenly" with production team Sugar House. The band soon caught the attention of the independent record label Dirty Hit, to which the group signed in 2017, and on 20 February 2018, Pale Waves released their debut EP, All the Things I Never Said.

=== Recording ===
The first songs recorded for the album were "There's a Honey" and "Television Romance", both of which were produced by Matthew Healy and George Daniel of the pop rock band the 1975. Pale Waves came to Healy's attention after Jamie Oborne (the manager for both the 1975 and Pale Waves) played him the demo tracks of the aforementioned songs. Healy was struck by the songwriting – "There's a naivety and a purity to them and an honesty to them that kind of comes through in their music," he explained in an NME interview – and he subsequently reached out to the band, inquiring if he and Daniel could produce their songs. The band agreed to Healy's request and recorded the songs with him and Daniel in 2017. While talking to the University of Exeter's student-run newspaper Exeposé, Baron-Gracie explained that she and the band were delighted to work with Healy and Daniel: "It's been awesome, they're amazing producers. We felt really special that they wanted to spend their time on our tracks considering how busy they are".

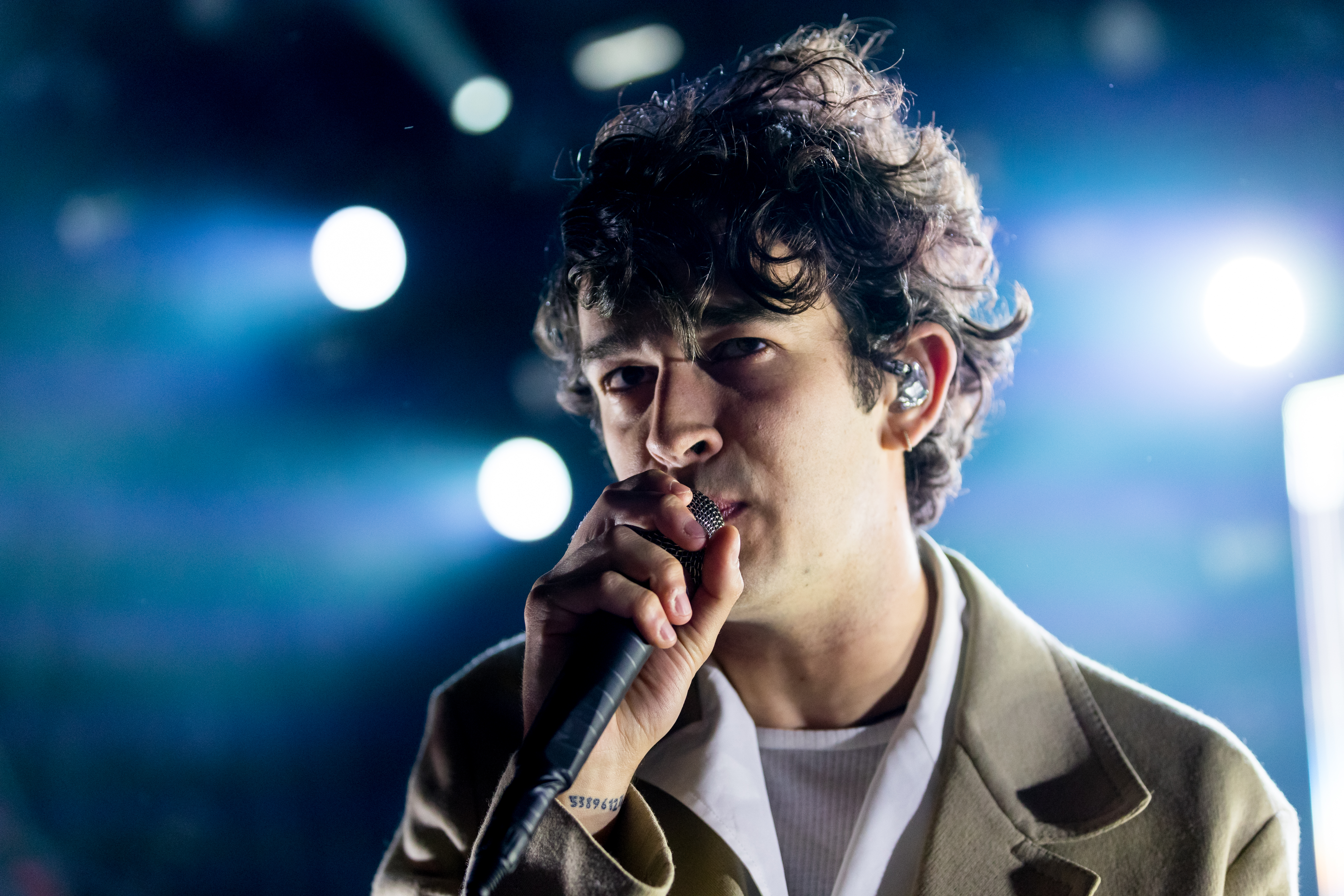
Matty Healy of the 1975 co-produced Pale Waves's singles "There's a Honey" and "Television Romance".

On 4 January 2018, Heather Baron-Gracie announced via Twitter that the band had begun recording their debut album. Pale Waves entered the studio with a "pencil-sketch plan" of what the wanted their album to sound like, but when recording began, the band began to rewrite and rework some of their material. "We got to the studio, and I had a mini breakdown because I didn't think we had enough songs that were good enough," Baron-Gracie admitted in an interview with Dork magazine. "Pressure really helped me", she continued, "[but] at times [recording] was really hard. Not just hard on me, but I could see it taking its effect on Ciara [Doran]. ... I was feeling stressed, and I could see it in [their] eyes as well". On 13 June 2018, Baron-Gracie confirmed via Twitter that recording had finished. Excepting "Television Romance" and "There's a Honey", the album was produced by Jonathan Gilmore, a music technician who had previously worked with the 1975 on their eponymous album (2013), and their subsequent records, I Like It When You Sleep, for You Are So Beautiful yet So Unaware of It (2016), and A Brief Inquiry into Online Relationships (2018). The versions of "There's a Honey" and "Television Romance" that appear on My Mind Makes Noises were slightly remixed by Gilmore and Doran, and Doran provided additional production for the entire album.

Sonically, the music on My Mind Makes Noises is informed by pop music from the 1980s. When asked by Music Feeds magazine why the band gravitated toward the sound of this decade, Baron-Gracie explained, "Me and [Ciara] grew up with our parents playing a lot of music from the eighties, so it's sort of engraved into us from such an early stage in our lives that I guess we always gravitate towards that era. I loved twinkly synths and the jangly chorus guitars". 1980s musicians and bands whom the band members have cited in particular as influences include The Blue Nile, Madonna, Prince, Cocteau Twins, and the Cure. Some music critics have noted the sonic influence of the 1975 on the album, although Baron-Gracie has pushed back on blanket comparisons between her band and the 1975, telling Nylon magazine: "I guess people just hear poppy guitars these days and think, 'The 1975,' because they're the most relevant band at the moment, and they're so big people are automatically inclined to compare".

=== Content ===
Speaking to the BBC on 8 January 2018 about the album, Heather Baron-Gracie explained that while most of the music the band had released up until that point was about romance, many of the songs from My Mind Makes Noises were more introspective: "The songs we have out now are very influenced by romance. The album is me talking about a lot of my darker issues. I talk about a lot of things that go on in my mind rather than in my heart ... I talk about a lot of my insecurities, which I think a lot of people will relate to and will find really comforting. There's a lot of content which I think will strike a chord with people, who will think it's really honest". In a subsequent interview with Music Week on 15 January 2018, Baron-Gracie further described the album as more sombre and personal: "A lot of people have only heard our pop songs, so I can't wait to give them the other side of Pale Waves, which is super dark and vulnerable".

A 20-second sample of "There's a Honey", a song which Heather Baron-Gracie described as "a bit of shoegaze but pop at the same time".

The album-opener, "Eighteen", was written while the band was touring. Baron-Gracie had "had [the] first verse written for ages", and Doran wrote music around Baron-Gracie's lyrics. Doran's contributions were inspired by their affective response to Greg Mottola's film Adventureland (2009), and in a 2018 interview with Ones to Watch, Doran noted that "vibes from films can really give you inspiration for sound". Because several people who had heard the song felt like it would be "big", the band decided to have it open the record. The album's second track, "There's a Honey", was released on 20 February 2017 as the band's first single after signing to Dirty Hit. According to Baron-Gracie, the song "is about a failed relationship, the sense of desperation, contrasting feelings and insecurities". When recording the track, the band aimed for something "dreamy and dark", like "something you could hear off a movie track"; Baron-Gracie later defined the sound as "a bit of shoegaze but pop at the same time". A 12-string Vox Phantom guitar owned by Matty Healy was used when recording the song's main riff; Healy later gifted this guitar to Baron-Gracie as a birthday present. "Noises" discusses mental health, focusing on struggles with body image and self-esteem. "['Noises' is] such an important song to me", Baron-Gracie told Dork magazine. "I wrote it when I was going through a difficult time. I was struggling with how I looked and how my body was". Baron-Gracie also expressed her hope that the song might have a positive influence on the band's younger fans: "A lot of our fans are young, they're growing up, and they're figuring out who they want to be. It was important for me to write a song on self-esteem and mental health issues because ... they need someone else to say, 'You know what? It's okay 'cos I'm feeling the same'". Doran revealed in a BBC interview that they had had the first line of the song (i.e., "My mind makes noises", from which the album derives its name) tattooed on their arm: "It's my favourite lyric," Doran explained. "That's the most personal song [Baron-Gracie]'s ever written. I love that song. That's all about Heather's world".

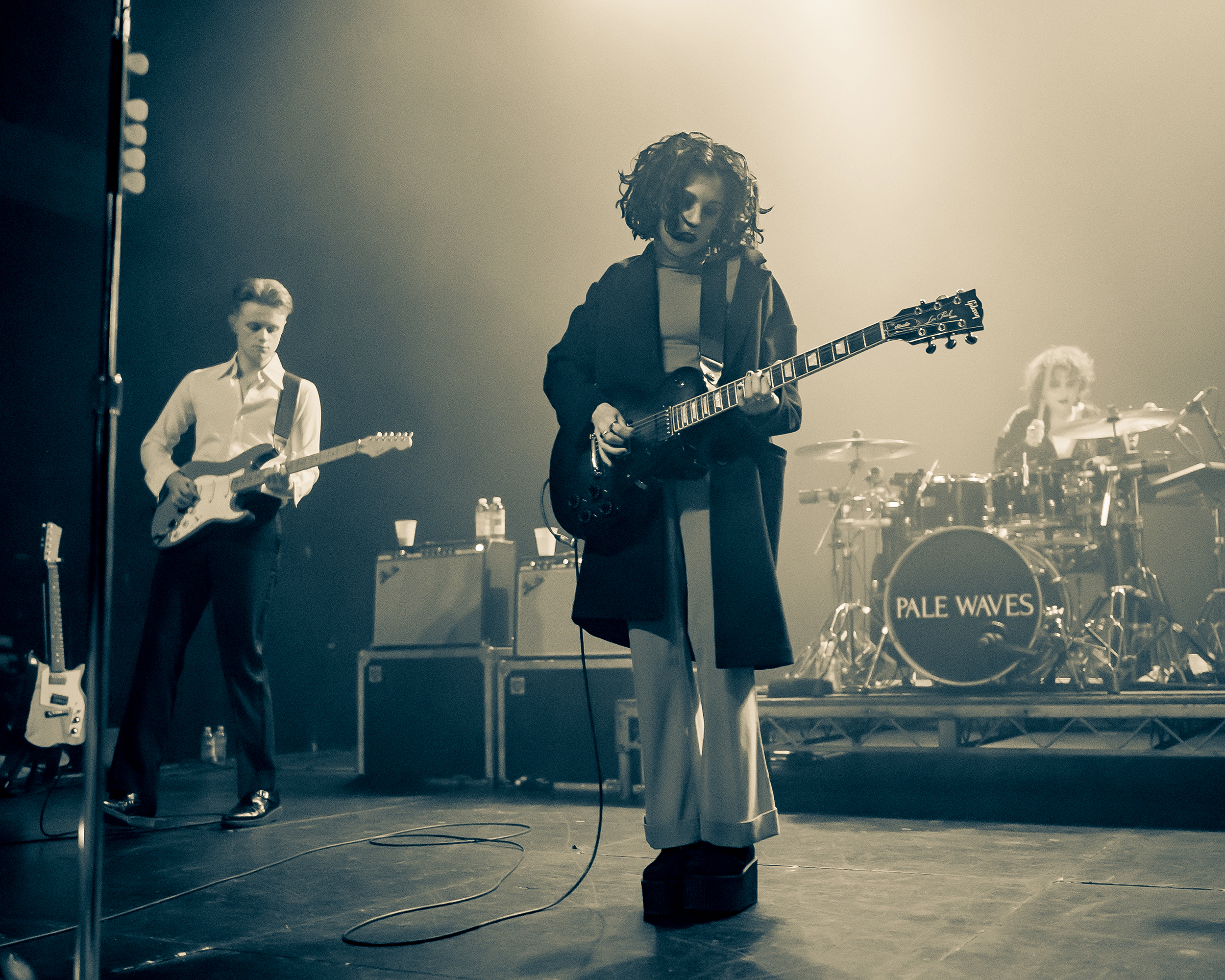
The songs on My Mind Makes Noises were written by Heather Baron-Gracie (centre), and Ciara Doran (right).

While discussing the songs "Came in Close" and Loveless Girl" with Ones to Watch, Baron-Gracie emphasized that they were both "really influenced by Ciara". Doran was inspired to "dancey" vibe of "Came in Close" to Aretha Franklin's single "Jump to It", which Doran was listening to while working on the song's bassline. "Loveless Girl" was based on Baron-Gracie's experiences as an aloof high school student, with particular inspiration coming from a time she was chastised by an admirer after rejecting their advances: "That person ... wanted me to be in a relationship with them, and then when I explained to them that I didn't feel that certain type of way towards them ... [they] said I was cold and loveless and mean. But it was just because I was rejecting them". "Drive" was inspired by the synth-pop sound of the Naked and Famous, and Baron-Gracie considers it to be a sort of follow-up to "Noises", telling Ones to Watch that if "'Noises' was when I was 16, ... 'Drive' is where I am now at 23". Baron-Gracie later told Coup de Main magazine that the song was about self-discovery and mental growth: "Sometimes I get really sad about stupid things, and I'm like, 'God, I'm 23, why [am] I still feeling liks this?' Or why am I still doing silly immature shit?" "When Did I Lose it All?" is about "having somebody who's 'the one,' and you know that they're right for you but you just don't work in that moment". "She" is an "all emo" lament that details a once-passionate relationship collapsing; musically, it was one of the first tracks that Doran composed almost entirely by themself.

A 20-second sample of "Television Romance". Many sources have compared the track to the music of the 1975.

"One More Time" was consciously written by the band to be one of the album's "pop bangers". Described by Doran as "straightforward" and "pop", the track was crafted to "sound really good with Heather on guitar". Doran composed the track's musical structure, and Baron-Gracie wrote the song's chorus immediately after hearing what Doran had developed: "Usually we're perfectionists", Baron-Gracie told Ones to Watch, "and we're like, 'If it's the first thing it can't be right,' but with this, we were like, 'You know what? That's it.'" "Television Romances" was written by the band in 2016, during a period of self-doubt, as Baron-Gracie explained to NME: "We got off that tour, and we're like, 'Right, we can't write.' We were so sad. ... [But] then we came out with one of our best songs". Lyrically, the song was inspired by Baron-Gracie's experience with an unwanted admirer, as she told Billboard magazine: "[The song is] about a night we had ... [And] somebody was just constantly coming onto me, and I was like, 'No, please stop! Because one, I don't want this, and two, I'm not really into you.' And they just wouldn't stop and I was like, 'Is it not obvious that I don't like you back?'" In a discussion with Sarah Kidd of Ambient Light, Baron-Gracie noted that some listeners have incorrectly taken "Television Romance" to be a love song, even though it is really "a rejection song ... It's looking at romance in a negative manner". Musically, many critics have compared the song to the music of the 1975.

"Red" had originally been envisioned by Baron-Gracie as an acoustic track, but when she showed the song to Doran, the latter insisted that this musical approach "wasn't right". The two reworked the song, adding in a "club track" chorus. "Kiss" was another older composition, with its origins dating back to when Baron-Gracie was a student at BIMM Manchester. In one class, Baron-Gracie had been tasked with "writ[ing] a soundtrack to a film", and so she spliced scenes from John Hughes's The Breakfast Club (1985) down into a trailer-length video and scored it. Doran and Baron-Gracie later took the score and fleshed it out into what evolved into "Kiss". In a conversation with Clash magazine, Baron-Gracie described "Kiss" as "a naive song" because its lyrics were written when she was "try[ing to] get into the mindset of being a songwriter for a band, rather than a solo artist". Musically, "Kiss" has been compared to the work of the Cure and Robert Smith. The album's penultimate track, "Black" was another song that had been written years before the album's release. The track (originally called "You Don't Love us Anymore") went through several iterations, which led Baron-Gracie to call it "the most problematic song" that the band had ever written. Musically, "Black" fuses "really frantic and really rock" verses with a more "relaxed R&B" chorus. My Mind Makes Noises closes with "Karl (I Wonder What It's Like to Die)", a sparsely-arranged acoustic song in which Baron-Gracie mourns the loss of her grandfather, who died when she was 14. The track – described by DIY magazine as being "filled with an almost uncomfortable level of sadness and pain" – was written after Doran encouraged Baron-Gracie to channel her grief through music. Due to its emotional resonance, Baron-Gracie has cited "Karl" as her favourite song on the album.

== Promotion and singles ==
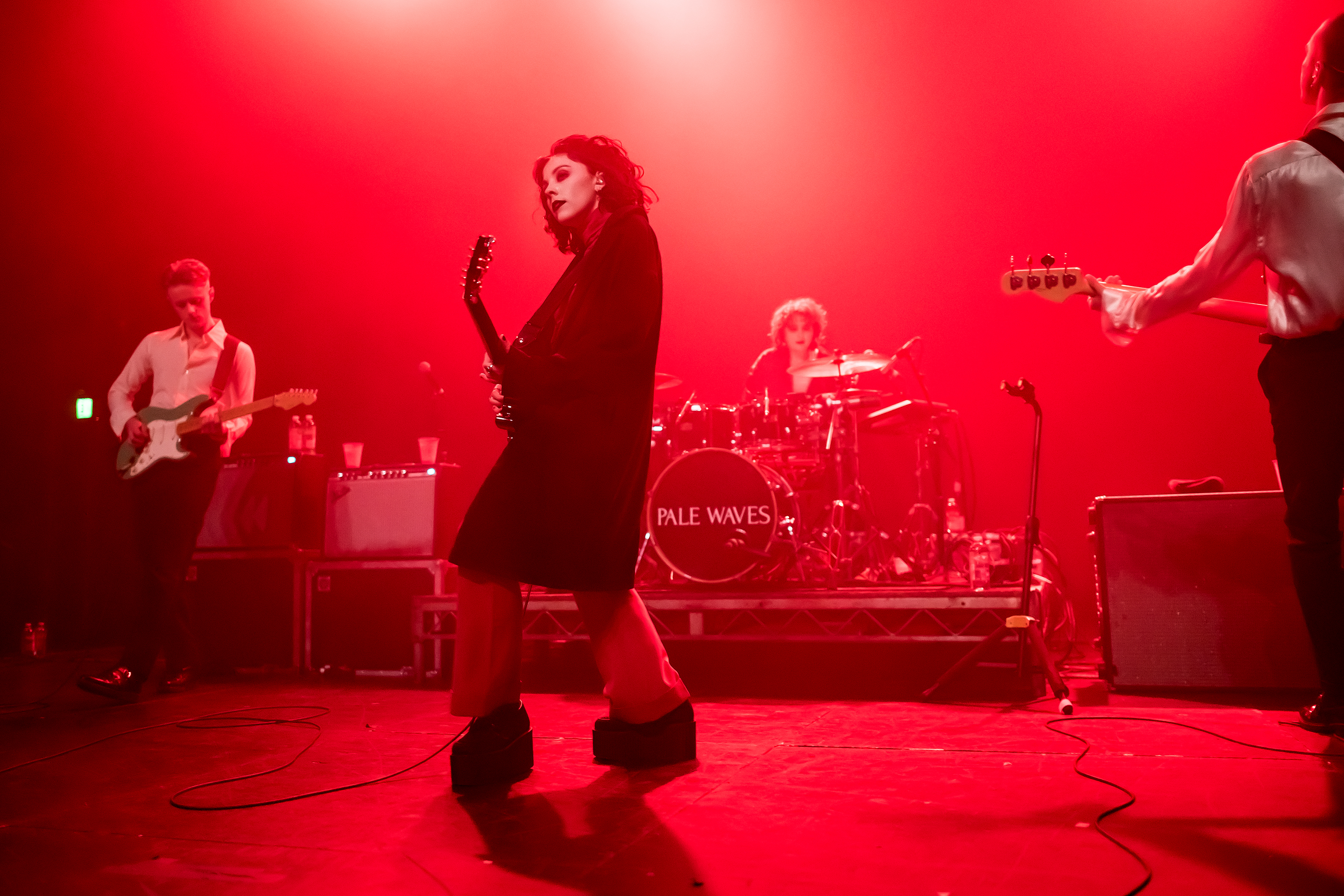
To promote the album, Pale Waves embarked on a three-month tour of the United States.

The album's first single "There's a Honey" was released on 20 February 2017, and music video for the song, directed by Silent Tapes, was released on 11 April 2017. Matty Healy and Samuel Burgess-Johnson served as the video's creative directors. The video for "There's a Honey" focuses on the group performing the song in the dark under a translucent magenta cloth. When talking to Fader about the video, Baron-Gracie noted: "For the first Pale Waves video we wanted [it to be] minimal and beautiful. Drawing inspiration from American sculptor Daniel Wurtzel, [we wanted something] romantic [while also] evoking a feeling of claustrophobia". The album's second single, "Television Romance", was released on 16 August 2017. The music video for the single was co-directed by Samuel Burgess-Johnson and Matty Healy, and it debuted on 18 September 2017. The video features the band performing the song in the living room of a flat located in Ashton-under-Lyne in the Greater Manchester area. The flat used in the video was owned by a 92-year-old woman (according to Healy, "She had no clue what was going on but she was loving it"). Both "There's a Honey" and "Television Romance" were re-released on 10 November 2017 as a limited edition white 7" double A-side single, which debuted at number 83 on the Scottish Singles Chart, and at number 2 on the UK Vinyl Singles and UK Singles Sales Charts.

"Kiss" was officially released as the album's third single on 15 May 2018, although it had earlier leaked on Spotify before being taken down. "Kiss" premiered on Annie Mac's Radio 1. A music video for "Kiss" was released on 14 June 2018. Directed by Robert Hales, this video is in filmed in black and white and sees the band performing in a seemingly disused warehouse while black paint leaks from the walls. The fourth single, "Noises", was released on 28 June 2018, debuting on Zane Lowe's Beats1 radio show. Around a month later, on 20 July 2018, the band released a video for the single. Directed by Gareth Phillips, this video sees Baron-Gracie performing as four distinct characters, each dressed in a unique style. On 24 July 2018, the band released "Eighteen" as the fifth single from the record. "Eighteen" also debuted on Mac's Radio 1 show, and it later charted at 55 on Billboard Japan. The music video for "Eighteen", directed by Adam Powell, was released on 22 August 2018 and follows Baron-Gracie as she goes on a road trip across the United States. Footage of Baron-Gracie walking through a forest, staying in a motel, visiting a diner, and driving in her car is interspersed with flashbacks of Baron-Gracie's trysts with an unseen lover. The sixth single from the album, "Black", was released on 14 August 2018. The song premiered on Beats1. "One More Time" was released on 13 September 2018 as the final single from the album. A music video for "One More Time" was released on 17 September 2018, which was directed by the duo Sophia + Robert, sees Pale Waves perform the song in a small red room.

In August 2018, Pale Waves received a Music Export Growth Scheme (MEGS) grant from the Department for International Trade, which helped offset the cost of the band's international touring. To promote My Mind Makes Noises in the United States, Pale Waves performed "Eighteen" on the 14 November 2018 episode of Late Night with Seth Meyers. The band also embarked on a three-month tour of North America that stretched from October 26 to December 6; at the start of 2019, the band subsequently embarked on the Music for Cars Tour, opening for the 1975.

== Critical reception ==
Professional ratings
Aggregate scores
Source	Rating
AnyDecentMusic?	6.2/10
Metacritic	61/100
Review scores
Source	Rating
Clash	7/10 stars
DIY	4/5 stars
Dork	5/5 stars
Exclaim!	7/10 stars
The Guardian	2/5 stars
The Independent	2/5 stars
The Line of Best Fit	8/10 stars
NME	4/5 stars
Q	3/5 stars

The record received mostly positive reviews from music critics. At review aggregation website Metacritic the album has an average score of 61 out of 100 indicating "generally favorable reviews" based on 10 reviews. Fellow music aggregator AnyDecentMusic? likewise gave the album an average score of 6.2/10.

Dork magazine gave the album a perfect score; reviewer Stephen Ackroyd called the album "a glorious coronation, plain and simple" and noted that My Mind Makes Noises was a record of "such assured confidence it belies just how raw Pale Waves still are". Sean Ward of the Line of Best Fit gave the album a highly positive review and praised the band's ambition to resurrect guitar music: "As we are constantly reminded guitar music is long deceased, four musicians arrive who look, aptly, as though they have come back from the dead". Ward concluded that "My Mind Makes Noises is both immediate and idiosyncratic", and that while "Pale Waves' presence may be gloomy ... their songwriting and ambition could not be brighter". Writing for DIY magazine, Rachel Finn argued that this record proved Pale Waves to be "a band keen to subvert your expectations", whose debut album was "filled to the brim with hooky pop choruses centred around that well-trodden songwriting topic of falling in and out of love". Finn noted that the record "show[ed] both sonic and lyrical growth from [the band's] first EP", and concluded that it was ultimately "a pop record with substance at its core".

Thomas Smith of NME magazine called My Mind Makes Noises "an impressive, deft debut" that he hypothesized would propel the band "from cult concern to the big leagues". Smith further argued that the record "encapsulates everything Pale Waves are: emotional, arresting and endearing". Clash magazine writer Robin Murray called the record a "stellar debut". "Battle-hardened by lengthy tours across the land and beyond", Murray wrote, "Pale Waves bring that energy into the studio on a crisp, effervescent debut LP". The reviewer concluded that My Mind Makes Noises "feels like a beginning – a picture not entirely in focus, but somehow you can't rest your eyes away". Ian Gormely of Exclaim! magazine wrote that Baron-Gracie "broadcasts her highest highs and lowest lows overtop of light and shimmering '80s rock and R&B with a modern pop gloss". Goermly argued that the band's aesthetic, as exemplified by Baron-Gracie, was key to their success, serving as a "hook" that reels listeners in. While noting that the record's "repetitive nature" and its highly produced sound may alienate potential listeners, Gormely nevertheless concluded that "if early aughts emo was your jam, there'll certainly be lots to love here".

Q magazine gave My Mind Makes Noises a somewhat mixed review, noting that while it was "a promising start", there was still "room for improvement". Roisin O'Connor of The Independent likewise wrote that the album "show flashes of potential but an awful lot of mimicry"; she concluded that while "it's fine to be influenced by one particular band, [Pale Waves] need to find their own voice or risk being known as little more than The 1975's pale imitators". Alexis Petridis of The Guardian called it "an album with ambitions bigger than its abilities". Petridis negatively compared the band to other pop artists ("what Pale Waves really sound like is Taylor Swift in 80s retro mode"), with the caveat that they "don't yet have the facility to craft a knockout pop song to take on the Swedish songwriting factories".

=== Accolades ===
Publication	Rank	List
The Best Albums of 2018	33	The Line of Best Fit
NME's Albums of the Year 2018	53	NME
NME's The best debut albums of 2018... so far	19	NME

== Commercial performance ==
My Mind Makes Noises was released by Dirty Hit on 14 September 2018 on cassette tape, CD and vinyl record; the record was also released on streaming platforms and as a digital download. The record charted at number five on the midweek UK Albums Chart Update, and on 21 September 2018, it debuted at number eight on the UK Albums Chart, selling 7,110 copies in its first week. The record was also the best-selling cassette tape of the week. In its second week on the chart the record fell to number 60. In the United States (where it was distributed by Interscope Records), the album debuted at number one on the Billboard Heatseekers Albums chart and number 39 on the Top Album Sales chart, selling 3,000 copies.

== Track listing ==
All tracks are written by Ciara Doran and Heather Baron-Gracie.

No.	Title	Producer(s)	Length
1.	"Eighteen"	Jonathan Gilmore	3:00
2.	"There's a Honey"	George Daniel; Matthew Healy	3:50
3.	"Noises"	Gilmore	4:06
4.	"Came in Close"	Gilmore	3:03
5.	"Loveless Girl"	Gilmore	3:04
6.	"Drive"	Gilmore	4:14
7.	"When Did I Lose It All?"	Gilmore	3:57
8.	"She"	Gilmore	4:14
9.	"One More Time"	Gilmore	2:39
10.	"Television Romance"	Daniel; Healy	3:24
11.	"Red"	Gilmore	3:56
12.	"Kiss"	Gilmore	3:10
13.	"Black"	Gilmore	3:54
14.	"Karl (I Wonder What It's Like to Die)"	Gilmore	3:39
Total length:			50:10

Japan edition bonus track
No.	Title	Length
15.	"The Tide" (Demo)	3:13
Total length:		53:41

== Personnel ==
Credits adapted from the liner notes of My Mind Makes Noises.

Pale Waves

- Heather Baron-Gracie – vocals, rhythm guitar
- Ciara Doran – drums, synths, programming
- Hugo Silvani – lead guitar
- Charlie Wood – bass

Additional musicians

- Jonathan Gilmore – programming

Technical

- Jonathan Gilmore – production (tracks 1, 3–9, 11–14), additional production (tracks 2, 10)
- George Daniel – production (tracks 2, 10)
- Matthew Healy – production (tracks 2, 10)
- Ciara Doran – additional production (tracks 1–14)
- Joseph Rodgers – engineering
- Mark "Spike" Stent – mixing
- Robin Schmidt – mastering

Artwork

- Samuel Burgess-Johnson – art direction
- Danny North – photography

== Charts ==
=== Weekly charts ===
Chart (2018)	Peak position
Irish Albums (IRMA)	61
Japanese Albums (Oricon)	52
Japan Hot Albums (Billboard Japan)	63
Scottish Albums (Official Charts)	8
UK Albums (Official Charts)	8
UK Independent Albums (Official Charts)	1
US Heatseekers Albums (Billboard)	1
US Top Album Sales (Billboard)	39

=== Year-end charts ===
Chart (2018)	Position
UK Official Cassettes Chart (OCC)	20

== Release history ==
Country	Date	Format	Variant	Label	Catalog no.	Ref.
Various	14 September 2018	CD	Standard	Dirty Hit; Interscope	DH00383	
Various	14 September 2018	CD	Limited edition variant	Dirty Hit; Interscope	DH00389	
Various	14 September 2018	LP	Standard	Dirty Hit; Interscope	DH00379	
Various	14 September 2018	LP	Clear variant	Dirty Hit; Interscope	DH00385	
Various	14 September 2018	LP	Translucent red variant	Dirty Hit; Interscope	DH00386	
Various	14 September 2018	LP	Limited edition variant	Dirty Hit; Interscope	DH00388	
Various	14 September 2018	cassette	Standard	Dirty Hit; Interscope	DH00384	
Various	14 September 2018	digital download	—	Dirty Hit; Interscope	—	
Various	14 September 2018	Streaming	—	Dirty Hit; Interscope	—	
