= List of 2022 albums =

The following is a list of albums, EPs, and mixtapes released in 2022. These albums are (1) original, i.e. excluding reissues, remasters, and compilations of previously released recordings, and (2) notable, defined as having received significant coverage from reliable sources independent of the subject.

For additional information about bands formed, reformed, disbanded, or on hiatus, for deaths of musicians, and for links to musical awards, see 2022 in music.

== First quarter ==
=== January ===
List of albums released in January 2022
Go to: January | February | March | April | May | June | July | August | September | October | November | December | Back to top
Release date	Artist	Album	Genre	Label	Ref.
January 3	Up10tion	Novella		TOP Media	
January 3	Kep1er	First Impact		Wake One, Swing	
January 4	Onewe	Planet Nine: Voyager	Rock	RBW	
January 5	ASP	Placebo	J-pop	WACK	
January 5	Omega X	Love Me Like		Spire Entertainment	
January 5	SixTones	City		Sony Music Japan	
January 6	Burial	Antidawn	Ambient	Hyperdub	
January 6	Montana of 300	Rap God		Fly Guy Entertainment	
January 7	Dope Lemon	Rose Pink Cadillac		BMG	
January 7	Gunna	DS4Ever	Trap	YSL, 300	
January 7	Inna	Champagne Problems #DQH1	Dance-pop	Global	
January 7	RuPaul	Mamaru	Bubblegum pop, hyperpop	RuCo Inc	
January 7	Spector	Now or Whenever		Moth Noise	
January 7	Tony Malaby's Sabino	The Cave of Winds	Jazz	Pyroclastic Records	
January 7	Twin Atlantic	Transparency			
January 7	The Weeknd	Dawn FM	Dance-pop, synth-pop	XO, Republic	
January 12	Yuuri	Ichi		Ariola Japan	
January 13	Excision	Onyx	Dubstep, death metal	Subsidia Records	
January 14	Anna von Hausswolff	Live at Montreux Jazz Festival		Southern Lord, Pomperipossa Records	
January 14	Blood Red Shoes	Ghosts on Tape	Alternative rock	Jazz Life	
January 14	Bonobo	Fragments	House	Ninja Tune	
January 14	Cat Power	Covers	Rock	Domino	
January 14	Cordae	From a Birds Eye View	Hip-hop	Atlantic	
January 14	Drew Holcomb & Ellie Holcomb	Coming Home: A Collection of Songs			
January 14	Earl Sweatshirt	Sick!		Tan Cressida, Warner	
January 14	Eliza Gilkyson	Songs from the River Wind		Howlin' Dog Records	
January 14	Elvis Costello and the Imposters	The Boy Named If	Rock and roll	EMI	
January 14	Enterprise Earth	The Chosen	Deathcore	eOne	
January 14	Fickle Friends	Are We Gonna Be Alright?			
January 14	Fit for an Autopsy	Oh What the Future Holds	Deathcore, post-metal	Nuclear Blast	
January 14	FKA Twigs	Caprisongs	Art pop, avant-pop	Young, Atlantic	
January 14	The Lumineers	Brightside		Dualtone, Decca	
January 14	Magnum	The Monster Roars		SPV/Steamhammer	
January 14	Shadow of Intent	Elegy	Deathcore, technical death metal, progressive death metal	Blood Blast	
January 14	Skillet	Domininon	Hard rock	Atlantic	
January 14	Tony Martin	Thorns	Heavy metal	Battlegod Productions	
January 14	Underoath	Voyeurist	Metalcore, post-hardcore	Fearless	
January 14	The Wombats	Fix Yourself, Not the World	Post-punk, Britpop	AWAL	
January 14	Worm Shepherd	Ritual Hymns	Blackened deathcore, black metal, symphonic metal	Unique Leader Records	
January 15	Molly Nilsson	Extreme	Synth-pop	Dark Skies Association, Night School	
January 19	Moonbyul	6equence		RBW	
January 19	Hikaru Utada	Bad Mode	Pop, R&B, electronica	Epic Japan, Sony Music Japan, Milan	
January 20	Pedro the Lion	Havasu		Polyvinyl	
January 20	Rich Brian	Brightside	Hip-hop	88rising	
January 21	Andrew Cyrille, William Parker, and Enrico Rava	2 Blues for Cecil	Jazz	TUM Records	
January 21	Aoife O'Donovan	Age of Apathy		Yep Roc	
January 21	Aurora	The Gods We Can Touch	Electropop	Decca, Glassnote	
January 21	Billy Talent	Crisis of Faith		Warner, Spinefarm	
January 21	Boris	W	Alternative rock, shoegaze, dream pop	Sacred Bones	
January 21	Christina Aguilera	La Fuerza	Latin	Sony Latin	
January 21	Ghostly Kisses	Heaven, Wait		Akira Records	
January 21	Iann Dior	On to Better Things	Emo rap, pop rap, pop-punk	10K	
January 21	Iced Earth	A Narrative Soundscape			
January 21	Janis Ian	The Light at the End of the Line		Rude Girl Records	
January 21	John Mellencamp	Strictly a One-Eyed Jack	Rock	Republic	
January 21	Kiefer Sutherland	Bloor Street		Pheromone Recordings	
January 21	King Gizzard & the Lizard Wizard	Butterfly 3001		KGLW	
January 21	Miles Kane	Change the Show	Northern soul, indie rock	BMG	
January 21	Palace	Shoals		Fiction	
January 21	Paul Oakenfold	Shine On		Perfecto	
January 21	The Sherlocks	World I Understand		TeddyBoy Records	
January 21	Silvana Estrada	Marchita	Classical, jazz, Latin American folk	Glassnote	
January 21	Walker Hayes	Country Stuff the Album	Country	Monument	
January 21	Yard Act	The Overload	Art punk, no wave, post-punk	Island	
January 21	Years & Years	Night Call	Pop	Polydor	
January 21	YoungBoy Never Broke Again	Colors	Hip-hop	Never Broke Again, Atlantic	
January 26	Scandal	Mirror	Pop rock, alternative rock	Victor Entertainment, JPU	
January 27	Glaive	Old Dog, New Tricks		Interscope	
January 28	Aaron Lewis	Frayed at Both Ends	Alternative country, country rock	Valory Music	
January 28	Amber Mark	Three Dimensions Deep		PMR	
January 28	Anaïs Mitchell	Anaïs Mitchell	Folk, indie folk, chamber folk	BMG	
January 28	Bad Suns	Apocalypse Whenever	Indie rock, post-punk	Epitaph	
January 28	Beirut	Artifacts	Indie rock	Pompeii	
January 28	Earthless	Night Parade of One Hundred Demons		Nuclear Blast	
January 28	Eels	Extreme Witchcraft	Garage rock	E Works, PIAS	
January 28	Five	Time			
January 28	Gigi De Lana	Gigi De Lana		Star	
January 28	Jethro Tull	The Zealot Gene	Folk, progressive rock	Inside Out	
January 28	Katie Dey	Forever Music		Katie Dey	
January 28	Krallice	Crystalline Exhaustion		P2 Records, Gilead Media	
January 28	Kyle	It's Not So Bad			
January 28	Maddie & Tae	Through the Madness, Vol. 1	Country pop	UMG	
January 28	Madrugada	Chimes at Midnight		Warner	
January 28	MØ	Motordrome	Pop	Columbia	
January 28	NLE Choppa	Me vs. Me	Trap	Warner	
January 28	Pinegrove	11:11	Americana, emo, indie rock	Rough Trade	
January 28	Praying Mantis	Katharsis	Hard rock	Frontiers	
January 28	Sebastián Yatra	Dharma	Latin, pop	Universal	
January 28	St. Paul and The Broken Bones	The Alien Coast		ATO	
January 28	Steve Vai	Inviolate	Instrumental rock	Favored Nations	
January 28	The Whitlams	Sancho		EGR	

=== February ===
List of albums released in February 2022
Go to: January | February | March | April | May | June | July | August | September | October | November | December | Back to top
Release date	Artist	Album	Genre	Label	Ref.
February 1	Ayaka	Love Cycle		A Station	
February 2	Airi Suzuki	26/27		Zetima	
February 2	Cynhn	Blue Cresc.		Imperial, I Blue	
February 2	Milet	Visions		SME	
February 2	@onefive	1518	J-pop, electropop	Amuse Inc.	
February 4	2 Chainz	Dope Don't Sell Itself	Trap	Def Jam	
February 4	Animal Collective	Time Skiffs	Indie pop, neo-psychedelia	Domino	
February 4	As It Is	I Went to Hell and Back	Post-hardcore, pop-punk, electronic rock	Fearless	
February 4	Bastille	Give Me the Future	Pop rock, power pop, synthwave	EMI	
February 4	Beam	Alien	Dancehall, trap	Epic	
February 4	Black Country, New Road	Ants from Up There	Post-rock, chamber pop, art rock	Ninja Tune	
February 4	Cate Le Bon	Pompeii	Art pop	Mexican Summer	
February 4	Circa Survive	A Dream About Death		Rise	
February 4	Dr. Dre	Grand Theft Auto: The Contract		Aftermath, Interscope	
February 4	Hippo Campus	LP3	Indie pop, soft rock, indie rock	Grand Jury Music	
February 4	Jennifer Lopez and Maluma	Marry Me	Dance-pop, pop, reggaeton	Universal Studios, Sony Latin	
February 4	Junglepussy	JP5000			
February 4	K.Flay	Inside Voices / Outside Voices	Indie rock	BMG Rights Management	
February 4	Korn	Requiem	Nu metal	Loma Vista	
February 4	Marissa Nadler	The Wrath of the Clouds		Sacred Bones	
February 4	Mitski	Laurel Hell	Synth-pop, indie pop, electronic rock	Dead Oceans	
February 4	A Place to Bury Strangers	See Through You		Dedstrange	
February 4	Rolo Tomassi	Where Myth Becomes Memory		MNRK	
February 4	Saba	Few Good Things	Hip-hop, neo soul	Saba Pivot LLC	
February 4	Saxon	Carpe Diem	Heavy metal	Silver Lining	
February 4	The Slow Show	Still Life		PIAS, Velveteen Records	
February 4	Venom Prison	Erebos		Century Media	
February 4	Yeule	Glitch Princess	Glitch pop	Bayonet Records	
February 7	J. Holiday	Time		Empire	
February 9	Liyuu	Fo (u) r YuU		Lantis	
February 10	Gloria Groove	Lady Leste		Sony Music Brazil	
February 11	Alt-J	The Dream	Art pop, alternative rock, indie rock	Infectious, Canvasback	
February 11	Amorphis	Halo	Progressive metal, melodic death metal, folk metal	Atomic Fire Records	
February 11	Amos Lee	Dreamland		Dualtone	
February 11	Author & Punisher	Krüller	Industrial metal, experimental metal	Relapse	
February 11	Big Thief	Dragon New Warm Mountain I Believe in You	Folk rock	4AD	
February 11	Cult of Luna	The Long Road North	Sludge metal, progressive metal, post-metal	Metal Blade	
February 11	Eddie Vedder	Earthling	Rock	Seattle Surf, Republic	
February 11	Foxes	The Kick	Dance-pop	PIAS	
February 11	Frank Turner	FTHC		Xtra Mile	
February 11	Graace	Self Preservation		Sony Music, The Orchard	
February 11	Half Alive	Give Me Your Shoulders, Pt. 1		RCA	
February 11	Joss Stone	Never Forget My Love	R&B	Bay Street Records	
February 11	Joywave	Cleanse		Hollywood, Cultco	
February 11	Kim Petras	Slut Pop	Dance-pop	Republic	
February 11	Mary J. Blige	Good Morning Gorgeous	Hip-hop, R&B	300, Mary Jane Productions	
February 11	Maverick City Music	Breathe		Tribl Records	
February 11	Once Human	Scar Weaver	Groove metal, melodic death metal	earMUSIC	
February 11	Raveena	Asha's Awakening		Warner	
February 11	Shamir	Heterosexuality	Synth-pop, industrial, R&B	AntiFragile Music	
February 11	Slash feat. Myles Kennedy & The Conspirators	4		Gibson Records	
February 11	Snoop Dogg	BODR	West Coast hip-hop, G-funk	Death Row	
February 11	Snot	Ethereal		300	
February 11	Spoon	Lucifer on the Sofa	Indie rock, blues rock	Matador	
February 11	Trentemøller	Memoria		In My Room	
February 11	Voivod	Synchro Anarchy	Progressive metal, thrash metal	Century Media	
February 11	Wilkinson	Cognition		Sleepless Music	
February 11	Zeal & Ardor	Zeal & Ardor	Black metal, industrial metal, blackgaze	MKVA	
February 14	Apink	Horn	K-pop	IST	
February 14	Taeyeon	INVU	K-ballad, dance, pop	SM	
February 15	Black Dresses	Forget Your Own Face	Industrial, noise pop	Blacksquares Records	
February 16	Alice Glass	Prey//IV	Electronic	Eating Glass Records	
February 16	Team Shachi	Team		Warner Music Japan	
February 18	Annihilator	Metal II	Thrash metal, heavy metal	earMUSIC	
February 18	Bad Boy Chiller Crew	Disrespectful	Bassline	House Anxiety, Relentless	
February 18	Beach House	Once Twice Melody	Dream pop, neo-psychedelia, chamber pop	Sub Pop	
February 18	Big K.R.I.T.	Digital Roses Don't Die	R&B, funk	BMG	
February 18	Bloodywood	Rakshak	Folk metal, nu metal, rap metal		
February 18	Bobby Weir & Wolf Bros	Live in Colorado	Rock, Americana	Third Man	
February 18	Broods	Space Island		Island	
February 18	Currensy and the Alchemist	Continuance	Hip-hop	Jet Life, ALC Records, Empire	
February 18	Esprit D'Air	Oceans	Power metal, electronicore	Starstorm Records	
February 18	Hurray for the Riff Raff	Life on Earth		Nonesuch	
February 18	Immolation	Acts of God	Death metal	Nuclear Blast	
February 18	Josef Salvat	Islands		Leafy Outlook	
February 18	Khruangbin and Leon Bridges	Texas Moon			
February 18	Lavender Country	Blackberry Rose	Country, Americana	Don Giovanni	
February 18	Metronomy	Small World		Because	
February 18	Midnight Oil	Resist	Alternative rock	Sony Music Australia	
February 18	Oliver Tree	Cowboy Tears	Country, pop, pop rock	Atlantic	
February 18	Rokia Koné and Jacknife Lee	Bamanan	Bambara music, electronic dance music	Real World	
February 18	Said the Sky	Sentiment		Lowly	
February 18	Sally Shapiro	Sad Cities		Italians Do It Better	
February 18	Sea Power	Everything Was Forever		Golden Chariot	
February 18	Star One	Revel in Time	Progressive metal	Inside Out Music	
February 18	White Lies	As I Try Not to Fall Apart		PIAS	
February 18	Yeat	2 Alive		Geffen	
February 21	STAYC	Young-Luv.com		High Up	
February 22	Joan Osborne	Radio Waves	R&B, rock	Womanly Hips Records	
February 22	Nmixx	Ad Mare		JYP	
February 22	Parannoul	White Ceiling / Black Dots Wandering Around			
February 23	Ai	Dream	Pop, R&B	EMI	
February 23	Billlie	The Collective Soul and Unconscious: Chapter One	Bass house, jazz	Mystic Story	
February 23	Super Beaver	Tokyo		Sony Music Japan	
February 24	Kanye West	Donda 2		Kanye West	
February 25	Adult	Becoming Undone		Dais	
February 25	Allegaeon	Damnum	Technical death metal, melodic death metal	Metal Blade	
February 25	Avril Lavigne	Love Sux	Pop-punk, skate punk, emo pop	Elektra, DTA Records	
February 25	Bad Omens	The Death of Peace of Mind	Alternative metal	Sumerian	
February 25	Basia Bulat	The Garden	Orchestral music	Secret City	
February 25	Beth Hart	A Tribute to Led Zeppelin		Provogue	
February 25	Blood Incantation	Timewave Zero	Ambient, space music	Century Media	
February 25	Brooke Ligertwood	Seven	Worship	Sparrow	
February 25	caroline	caroline		Rough Trade	
February 25	Carson McHone	Still Life		Merge	
February 25	Central Cee	23	UK drill	ADA	
February 25	CMAT	If My Wife New I'd Be Dead	Country pop	CMATBaby, AWAL	
February 25	Conway the Machine	God Don't Make Mistakes	Hip-hop	Shady	
February 25	Corey Taylor	CMFB... Sides	Heavy metal, hard rock	Roadrunner	
February 25	D'Virgilio, Morse & Jennings	Troika	Progressive rock, folk rock, pop rock	Inside Out Music	
February 25	Dashboard Confessional	All the Truth That I Can Tell		Hidden Note, AWAL	
February 25	EarthGang	Ghetto Gods	Southern hip-hop	Dreamville, Interscope, Spillage Village	
February 25	Gang of Youths	Angel in Realtime	Alternative rock	Mosy Recordings, Sony Music Australia	
February 25	Guns N' Roses	Hard Skool	Hard rock	Geffen	
February 25	Half Man Half Biscuit	The Voltarol Years	Post-punk	R. M. Qualtrough	
February 25	HammerFall	Hammer of Dawn	Power metal, heavy metal	Napalm	
February 25	Johnny Marr	Fever Dreams Pts 1-4		BMG	
February 25	Judy Collins	Spellbound	Folk	Cleopatra	
February 25	Kodak Black	Back for Everything		Atlantic	
February 25	Mom Jeans	Sweet Tooth			
February 25	Robert Glasper	Black Radio 3		Loma Vista	
February 25	Sasami	Squeeze	Indie rock, nu metal, industrial	Domino	
February 25	Scorpions	Rock Believer	Heavy metal, hard rock	Vertigo	
February 25	Sevdaliza	Raving Dahlia	Art pop, alternative R&B, trip hop	Twisted Elegance	
February 25	Superchunk	Wild Loneliness		Merge	
February 25	Tears for Fears	The Tipping Point	Pop rock, electropop, art pop	Concord	

=== March ===
List of albums released in March 2022
Go to: January | February | March | April | May | June | July | August | September | October | November | December | Back to top
Release date	Artist	Album	Genre	Label	Ref.
March 2	Cherry Bullet	Cherry Wish		FNC W	
March 3	The Cool Kids	Before Shit Got Weird			
March 4	10 Years	Deconstructed		Mascot	
March 4	Band of Horses	Things Are Great	Indie rock	BMG	
March 4	Benee	Lychee EP		Republic	
March 4	Bob Moses	The Silence in Between	Dance	Domino, Astralwerks	
March 4	Cécile McLorin Salvant	Ghost Song	Jazz	Nonesuch	
March 4	Charlotte Adigéry and Bolis Pupul	Topical Dancer	Electronic, experimental	Deewee	
March 4	Cloud Cult	Metamorphosis			
March 4	Crowbar	Zero and Below		MNRK	
March 4	Cruel Santino	Subaru Boys: Final Heaven		Monster Boy	
March 4	DaBaby and YoungBoy Never Broke Again	Better than You	Hip-hop, trap	Atlantic, Interscope	
March 4	Danielle Bradbery	In Between: The Collection		BMLG	
March 4	The Dead South	Easy Listening for Jerks, Part 1	Bluegrass	Six Shooter	
March 4	The Dead South	Easy Listening for Jerks, Part 2	Bluegrass	Six Shooter	
March 4	Diplo	Diplo	Dance-pop, electronic, house	Mad Decent	
March 4	Dolly Parton	Run, Rose, Run	Country, bluegrass	Butterfly Records	
March 4	Elevation Worship	Lion	Contemporary worship music	Elevation Worship, Provident Label Group	
March 4	El Ten Eleven	New Year's Eve		Joyful Noise	
March 4	The Flower Kings	By Royal Decree	Progressive rock	Inside Out	
March 4	Guided by Voices	Crystal Nuns Cathedral	Indie rock, power pop	Guided by Voices	
March 4	İlhan Erşahin, Dave Harrington & Kenny Wollesen	Invite Your Eye		Nublu	
March 4	Just Friends	Hella		Pure Noise	
March 4	King Von	What It Means to Be King	Drill	Only the Family, Empire	
March 4	Kojey Radical	Reason to Smile	British hip-hop, gospel, R&B	Asylum, Atlantic	
March 4	Krewella	The Body Never Lies		Mixed Kids Records	
March 4	Léon	Circles		Léon Recordings	
March 4	Luna Li	Duality		In Real Life Music	
March 4	Madi Diaz	Same History, New Feelings		Anti-	
March 4	Marillion	An Hour Before It's Dark	Neo-prog	earMUSIC	
March 4	Maylee Todd	Maloo		Stones Throw	
March 4	Melissa Aldana	12 Stars		Blue Note	
March 4	Mike Campbell & The Dirty Knobs	External Combustion	Rock	BMG	
March 4	Nilüfer Yanya	Painless	Indie rock, indie pop	ATO	
March 4	Oh Hiroshima	Myriad		Napalm	
March 4	Peach Pit	From 2 to 3		RCA	
March 4	RZA & DJ Scratch	Saturday Afternoon Kung Fu Theater			
March 4	Sabaton	The War to End All Wars	Power metal, heavy metal	Nuclear Blast	
March 4	Smoke DZA	Driplomatic Immunity			
March 4	Somi	Zenzile: The Reimagination of Miriam Makeba			
March 4	Songs: Ohia	Live: Vanquishers		Secretly Canadian	
March 4	Stereophonics	Oochya!	Rock	Stylus Records, Ignition	
March 4	Stromae	Multitude	Electronic	B1 Recordings, Mosaert	
March 4	Trip Lee	The End			
March 4	Ty Tabor	Shades		Rat Pak Records	
March 4	Vein.fm	This World Is Going to Ruin You		Closed Casket Activities, Nuclear Blast	
March 4	Vio-lence	Let the World Burn	Thrash metal	Metal Blade	
March 4	The Weather Station	How Is It That I Should Look at the Stars	Folk, folk jazz	Fat Possum	
March 4	Your Old Droog	YOD Wave			
March 4	Zander Schloss	Songs About Songs			
March 5	King Gizzard & the Lizard Wizard	Made in Timeland	Experimental, electronic	Flightless, KGLW, ATO	
March 5	Troglodyte	The Hierarchical Ecological Succession: Welcome to the Food Chain			
March 9	Masaki Suda	Collage		Epic Japan	
March 9	Milet	Flare		SME	
March 10	Lucky Daye	Candydrip	R&B	Keep Cool, RCA	
March 11	Alex Cameron	Oxy Music	Soft rock	Secretly Canadian	
March 11	Ben Abraham	Friendly Fire		Atlantic	
March 11	Ben Rector	The Joy of Music		OK Kid Recordings	
March 11	Benny the Butcher	Tana Talk 4	East Coast hip-hop	Griselda, Black Soprano Family	
March 11	Black Pantera	Ascensão	Thrash metal, hardcore punk	Deckdisc	
March 11	The Boo Radleys	Keep on with Falling	Britpop	BooSTR Records	
March 11	Brandon Boyd	Echoes & Cocoons		Wit Hustle, The Orchard	
March 11	Bryan Adams	So Happy It Hurts	Rock	BMG	
March 11	Charlie Collins	Undone		Island	
March 11	Dallas Woods	Julie's Boy	UK grime		
March 11	The Districts	Great American Painting		Fat Possum	
March 11	Drake White	The Optimystic			
March 11	Drug Church	Hygiene		Pure Noise	
March 11	Ella Henderson	Everything I Didn't Say	Pop	Asylum	
March 11	Elzhi & Georgia Anne Muldrow	Zhigeist		Nature Sounds	
March 11	Ferris & Sylvester	Superhuman			
March 11	Fly Anakin	Frank	Hip-hop	Lex	
March 11	For King & Country	What Are We Waiting For?	CCM, Christian alternative rock	Word Entertainment	
March 11	Ghost	Impera	Hard rock, arena rock, heavy metal	Loma Vista	
March 11	Hank Williams	I'm Gonna Sing: The Mother's Best Gospel Radio Recordings	Gospel	BMG	
March 11	Hoodoo Gurus	Chariot of the Gods	Power pop	Big Time	
March 11	Ho99o9	Skin	Nu metal, experimental hip-hop, industrial	DTA, Elektra	
March 11	Inna	Champagne Problems #DQH2	Dance-pop	Global	
March 11	Jenny Hval	Classic Objects	Experimental, art pop	4AD	
March 11	Jeremiah Chiu and Marta Sofia Honer	Recordings from the Åland Islands		International Anthem	
March 11	Khontkar and Downtown Dion	Fire Department			
March 11	Kxng Crooked and Joell Ortiz	Rise & Fall of Slaughterhouse	Hip-hop	Hitmaker Music Group	
March 11	Lil Durk	7220	Hip-hop	Only the Family, Alamo Records, Sony Music	
March 11	Men Without Hats	Again (Part 2)			
March 11	The Mysterines	Reeling	Grunge, garage rock	Fiction	
March 11	Nick Mono	The Sun Won't Stay After Summer		Warner	
March 11	Orion Sun	Getaway		Mom + Pop	
March 11	Rex Orange County	Who Cares?	Bedroom pop	Sony Music	
March 11	Set It Off	Elsewhere	Pop, pop rock	Fearless	
March 11	Shaman's Harvest	Rebelator		Mascot	
March 11	Shenseea	Alpha	Dancehall, hip-hop, pop	Rich Immigrants, Interscope	
March 11	The Shires	10 Year Plan		BMG	
March 11	Swim Deep	Familiarise Yourself with Your Closest Exit			
March 11	Tapani Rinne and Juha Mäki-Patola	Open	Ambient, jazz, neoclassical	Hush Hush Records	
March 11	Tony Monaco	Four Brothers	Jazz	Chicken Coup Records	
March 11	Taylor Alxndr	1993			
March 11	Team Me	Something in the Making			
March 11	Thomas Headon	Victoria			
March 11	Trey Anastasio	Mercy	Folk	Rubber Jungle	
March 11	Upsahl	This Is My First Live Album			
March 11	Widowspeak	The Jacket		Captured Tracks	
March 11	The Wiggles	ReWiggled		ABC	
March 11	Wolves at the Gate	Eulogies	Christian metal, metalcore, post-hardcore	Solid State	
March 11	Yelawolf and Shooter Jennings	Sometimes Y	Americana, hip-hop	Slumerican	
March 14	(G)I-dle	I Never Die	Pop	Cube, Kakao	
March 16	Midwxst	Better Luck Next Time	Hyperpop	Simple Stupid Records, Geffen	
March 17	Bladee and Ecco2k	Crest	Progressive pop, cloud rap	Year0001	
March 18	Agathodaimon	The Seven		Napalm	
March 18	ArrDee	Pier Pressure	British hip-hop, UK drill	Island, Universal	
March 18	Audio Karate	¡Otra!	Pop-punk	Iodine	
March 18	Ben Lukas Boysen	Clarion		Erased Tapes	
March 18	Charli XCX	Crash	Synth-pop, dance-pop, power pop	Asylum, Atlantic, Warner UK	
March 18	Cypress Hill	Back in Black		MNRK	
March 18	Dark Funeral	We Are the Apocalypse	Black metal	Century Media	
March 18	Feeder	Torpedo	Alternative rock, indie rock, grunge	Big Teeth Music	
March 18	Gayle	A Study of the Human Experience Volume One		Arthouse Records, Atlantic	
March 18	Hailey Whitters	Raised	Country	Big Loud, Pigasus Records	
March 18	Little Boots	Tomorrow's Yesterdays		On Repeat Records	
March 18	Midlake	For the Sake of Bethel Woods		Bella Union	
March 18	Pictish Trail	Island Family		Fire	
March 18	Rosalía	Motomami	Experimental pop, alternative reggaeton, avant-garde	Columbia	
March 18	The Score	Metamorph		Republic	
March 18	Sea Girls	Homesick	Indie rock	Polydor	
March 18	Sonic Youth	In/Out/In		Three Lobed Recordings	
March 18	Stabbing Westward	Chasing Ghosts		COP International	
March 18	Stray Kids	Oddinary	Hip-hop, trap, rock	JYP, Republic	
March 18	Svdden Death	Voyd II			
March 20	Weezer	SZNZ: Spring	Pop rock, folk rock	Atlantic	
March 21	Kid Rock	Bad Reputation	Southern rock, country, rap rock	Top Dog Records	
March 22	Phife Dawg	Forever	Hip-hop	Smokin' Needles, AWAL	
March 23	Bellows	Next of Kin		Topshelf	
March 23	Fujii Kaze	Love All Serve All	J-pop	Universal Sigma, Hehn Records	
March 23	Shiritsu Ebisu Chugaku	Shiritsu Ebisu Chugaku			
March 23	Sid	Umibe	Rock	Ki/oon	
March 24	Kenia Os	Cambios de luna		Sony Music Mexico	
March 24	Daddy Yankee	Legendaddy	Reggaeton	El Cartel, UMG, Republic	
March 25	Aldous Harding	Warm Chris	Baroque pop, folk-pop, psychedelic folk	4AD	
March 25	Animals as Leaders	Parrhesia		Sumerian	
March 25	Buddy	Superghetto		RCA	
March 25	Coin	Uncanny Valley		10K	
March 25	Denzel Curry	Melt My Eyez See Your Future	Hip-hop	PH Recordings, Loma Vista	
March 25	Destroyer	Labyrinthitis		Merge	
March 25	Dream Widow	Dream Widow		Roswell	
March 25	Guerilla Toss	Famously Alive		Sub Pop	
March 25	Hardcore Superstar	Abrakadabra			
March 25	Ibibio Sound Machine	Electricity		Merge	
March 25	Kavinsky	Reborn	Synthwave	Record Makers, Virgin France	
March 25	Keshi	Gabriel		Island	
March 25	Kilo Kish	American Gurl	Pop	Kisha Soundscape + Audio	
March 25	Koffee	Gifted		Promised Land, Columbia	
March 25	Kristian Bush	52 | ATL x BNA	Country	Big Machine	
March 25	Latto	777	Hip-hop	RCA, Streamcut	
March 25	Machine Gun Kelly	Mainstream Sellout	Pop-punk	Bad Boy, Interscope	
March 25	Maren Morris	Humble Quest	Country pop	Columbia Nashville	
March 25	Michael Bublé	Higher	Pop, swing	Reprise	
March 25	Michael Romeo	War of the Worlds, Pt. 2	Progressive metal, neoclassical metal, symphonic metal	Inside Out	
March 25	Nigo	I Know Nigo!		Victor Victor	
March 25	Paleface Swiss	Fear & Dagger		Blood Blast	
March 25	Placebo	Never Let Me Go	Alternative rock	Elevator Lady, Rise	
March 25	Proper	The Great American Novel	Emo, pop-punk, post-hardcore	Father/Daughter, Big Scary Monsters	
March 25	Reckless Love	Turborider	Pop metal	AFM	
March 25	Rema	Rave & Roses	Afrorave	Jonzing World, Mavin	
March 25	Wallows	Tell Me That It's Over		Atlantic	
March 25	Xavier Rudd	Jan Juc Moon		Virgin	
March 28	NCT Dream	Glitch Mode	R&B, pop, hip-hop	SM	
March 28	Oh My Girl	Real Love		WM	
March 29	Purple Kiss	MemeM	Trap, R&B, dance	RBW	
March 30	Sakanaction	Adapt		NF Records	
March 31	Dreamville and DJ Drama	D-Day: A Gangsta Grillz Mixtape		Dreamville	

== Second quarter ==
=== April ===
List of albums released in April 2022
Go to: January | February | March | April | May | June | July | August | September | October | November | December | Back to top
Release date	Artist	Album	Genre	Label	Ref.
April 1	μ-Ziq	Goodbye		Planet Mu	
April 1	Alabaster DePlume	Gold	Jazz	International Anthem	
April 1	Christian Lee Hutson	Quitters		Anti-	
April 1	Confidence Man	Tilt	House, big beat	I Oh You	
April 1	Duster	Together		The Numero Group	
April 1	Islander	It's Not Easy Being Human		Better Noise	
April 1	Jon Spencer & the Hitmakers	Spencer Gets It Lit	Alternative rock, garage rock	Bronzerat, Shove Records, In the Red	
April 1	Lights	Pep	Alternative rock	Fueled by Ramen	
April 1	Meshuggah	Immutable	Progressive metal, technical death metal, djent	Atomic Fire	
April 1	Miley Cyrus	Attention: Miley Live		Columbia, Smiley Miley Inc.	
April 1	Nekrogoblikon	The Fundamental Slimes and Humours			
April 1	PUP	The Unraveling of PUPTheBand	Punk rock	Little Dipper, Rise	
April 1	Red Hot Chili Peppers	Unlimited Love	Funk rock, alternative rock	Warner	
April 1	Sundara Karma	Oblivion!	Futurepop, emo, pop rock	AWAL, Chess Club Records	
April 1	Thomas Rhett	Where We Started	Country	Valory	
April 1	Wolf	Shadowland		Century Media	
April 6	Red Velvet	Bloom	J-pop	Avex Trax, SM Japan	
April 8	42 Dugg and EST Gee	Last Ones Left	Hip-hop	CMG, Warlike, Interscope	
April 8	Archive	Call to Arms & Angels			
April 8	Banks	Serpentina	Alt pop, R&B	AWAL	
April 8	Billy Woods	Aethiopes	Hip-hop	Backwoodz Studioz	
April 8	Calexico	El Mirador		Anti-	
April 8	Camila Cabello	Familia	Latin pop	Epic	
April 8	Cody Simpson	Cody Simpson		Coast House Records, The Orchard	
April 8	Coi Leray	Trendsetter	Hip-hop, pop	1801, Republic	
April 8	Cole Swindell	Stereotype	Country	Warner Music Nashville	
April 8	Daniel Rossen	You Belong There	Folk rock, chamber pop, folk-pop	Warp	
April 8	Destruction	Diabolical	Thrash metal	Napalm	
April 8	Father John Misty	Chloë and the Next 20th Century	Folk, jazz, swing	Sub Pop, Bella Union	
April 8	Fergus McCreadie	Forest Floor	Jazz, Scottish folk music	Edition	
April 8	Fivio Foreign	B.I.B.L.E.	Drill	Columbia	
April 8	Girl Talk, Wiz Khalifa, Big K.R.I.T., and Smoke DZA	Full Court Press	Hip-hop	Asylum, Taylor Gang	
April 8	Hayden James	Lifted		Future Classic	
April 8	Health	Disco4: Part II		Loma Vista	
April 8	Jack White	Fear of the Dawn	Blues rock, progressive rock, garage rock	Third Man	
April 8	Josh Ramsay	The Josh Ramsay Show	Pop	604	
April 8	Kae Tempest	The Line Is a Curve		American, Republic	
April 8	Kylie Minogue	Infinite Disco	Pop, disco	Darenote, BMG	
April 8	The Linda Lindas	Growing Up	Punk rock, pop-punk, power pop	Epitaph	
April 8	Lizzy McAlpine	Five Seconds Flat	Indie pop	AWAL, Harbour Artists & Music	
April 8	Lucius	Second Nature		Mom + Pop Music	
April 8	Omar Apollo	Ivory	Alternative R&B, hip-hop, indie	Warner	
April 8	Orville Peck	Bronco	Country rock, outlaw country, alt-country	Columbia, Sub Pop	
April 8	Papa Roach	Ego Trip	Pop-punk, rap rock, rap metal	New Noize Records	
April 8	The Regrettes	Further Joy	Pop, new wave	Warner	
April 8	Role Model	Rx		Interscope, Polydor	
April 8	Short Stack	Maybe There's No Heaven		UNFD	
April 8	Son Lux	Everything Everywhere All at Once (Original Motion Picture Soundtrack)	Ambient, experimental, post-rock	A24 Music	
April 8	Vince Staples	Ramona Park Broke My Heart	West Coast hip-hop	Blacksmith, Motown	
April 8	Wet Leg	Wet Leg	Indie rock, post-punk, alternative rock	Domino	
April 8	Whatever the Weather	Whatever the Weather	Electronic, ambient	Ghostly International	
April 8	Yung Lean	Stardust	Cloud rap	World Affairs	
April 11	Milica Pavlović	Posesivna	Pop	Señorita Music	
April 12	Anitta	Versions of Me	Reggaeton, pop	Warner	
April 12	Dreamcatcher	Apocalypse: Save Us	Dance, rock	Dreamcatcher	
April 13	Sault	Air	Choral, classical, funk	Forever Living Originals	
April 13	SennaRin	Dignified		Sacra Music	
April 14	Bülow	Booty Call		Universal Music Canada	
April 14	A Wilhelm Scream	Lose Your Delusion	Melodic hardcore, thrash metal	Creator-Destructor Records	
April 15	Alec Benjamin	(Un)Commentary		Elektra	
April 15	Alex G	We're All Going to the World's Fair Soundtrack			
April 15	The Crystal Method	The Trip Out		Ultra	
April 15	Fredo Bang	Two-Face Bang 2		Se Lavi Productions, Def Jam	
April 15	Jewel	Freewheelin' Woman		Words Matter Music	
April 15	Kurt Vile	Watch My Moves	Indie rock, folk rock, Americana	Verve Forecast	
April 15	Spanish Love Songs	Brave Faces Etc.			
April 15	Swedish House Mafia	Paradise Again	House	Republic	
April 15	Tim Kasher	Middling Age		15 Passenger, Thirty Something Records	
April 15	Vundabar	Devil for the Fire		Gawk Records	
April 19	Mdou Moctar	Afrique Refait		Matador	
April 20	Juice=Juice	Terzo		Up-Front Works	
April 20	Little Glee Monster	Journey		Sony Music Japan	
April 20	Lyrical School	L.S.			
April 20	Redveil	Learn 2 Swim	Hip-hop, jazz rap		
April 22	Anne Wilson	My Jesus	CCM	Capitol CMG	
April 22	Bonnie Raitt	Just Like That...	Blues rock, folk rock	Redwing Records	
April 22	Bowling for Soup	Pop Drunk Snot Bread	Pop-punk	Brando Records, Que-so Records	
April 22	Daniel Johns	FutureNever	Opera, dance, electro	BMG Music Australia	
April 22	Dorothy	Gifts from the Holy Ghost	Hard rock	Roc Nation	
April 22	English Teacher	Polyawkward	Art punk	Nice Swan Recordings	
April 22	Fontaines D.C.	Skinty Fia	Post-punk	Partisan, Rough Trade	
April 22	Hatchie	Giving the World Away	Dream pop	Secretly Canadian	
April 22	Jason Aldean	Georgia	Country, country rock	Broken Bow	
April 22	Kathryn Joseph	For You Who Are the Wronged		Rock Action	
April 22	King Gizzard & the Lizard Wizard	Omnium Gatherum	Psychedelic rock, heavy metal, progressive folk	KGLW	
April 22	Lisa Mitchell	A Place to Fall Apart		Broken Bow	
April 22	Northlane	Obsidian	Metalcore, electronic, alt-pop	Believe	
April 22	Ocean Grove	Up in the Air Forever	Nu metal	UNFD	
April 22	Primus	Conspiranoid	Progressive rock	ATO	
April 22	Psychedelic Porn Crumpets	Night Gnomes		What Reality?	
April 22	Pusha T	It's Almost Dry	Hip-hop	Def Jam, GOOD	
April 22	Spiritualized	Everything Was Beautiful	Space rock	Fat Possum	
April 23	Kirk Hammett	Portals	Progressive rock, metal, classical	Blackened	
April 23	Sun's Signature (Elizabeth Fraser and Damon Reece)	Sun's Signature		Partisan	
April 29	Action Bronson	Cocodrillo Turbo		Loma Vista, Concord	
April 29	Ann Wilson	Fierce Bliss			
April 29	Bloc Party	Alpha Games	Post-punk revival, dance-punk	Infectious, BMG	
April 29	Blossoms	Ribbon Around the Bomb		Virgin EMI	
April 29	Charlie Collins	Undone		Island Australia	
April 29	Cory Wong	Power Station		Roundwood Media	
April 29	Dana Fuchs	Borrowed Time		Ruf	
April 29	Faye Webster	Car Therapy Sessions		Secretly Canadian	
April 29	Future	I Never Liked You		Freebandz, Epic	
April 29	Kehlani	Blue Water Road	R&B, orchestral pop	Atlantic	
April 29	Kelly Lee Owens	LP.8		Smalltown Supersound	
April 29	Let's Eat Grandma	Two Ribbons	Synth-pop	Transgressive	
April 29	Mansionair	Happiness, Guaranteed.		Liberation	
April 29	Martin Garrix	Sentio		Stmpd	
April 29	Melody's Echo Chamber	Emotional Eternal	Psychedelic pop	Domino	
April 29	Miranda Lambert	Palomino	Country	Vanner Records, RCA Nashville	
April 29	MJ Lenderman	Boat Songs	Alt-country	Dear Life Records	
April 29	Psy	Psy 9th	K-pop	P Nation	
April 29	Rammstein	Zeit	Neue Deutsche Härte, industrial metal, industrial rock	Universal	
April 29	Robin Trower	No More Worlds to Conquer		Provogue	
April 29	Röyksopp	Profound Mysteries		Dog Triumph	
April 29	Sofi Tukker	Wet Tennis		Ultra	
April 29	Ted Nugent	Detroit Muscle		Pavement Music	
April 29	Tigran Hamasyan	StandArt	Jazz, bebop	Nonesuch	
April 29	Toro y Moi	Mahal	Psych-funk	Dead Oceans	
April 29	William Basinski and Janek Schaefer	...On Reflection		Temporary Residence Limited	
April 29	Willie Nelson	A Beautiful Time	Country	Legacy	

=== May ===
List of albums released in May 2022
Go to: January | February | March | April | May | June | July | August | September | October | November | December | Back to top
Release date	Artist	Album	Genre	Label	Ref.
May 2	Le Sserafim	Fearless	Alternative pop, R&B	YG Plus, Source Music	
May 3	Black Star	No Fear of Time	Hip-hop	Luminary	
May 6	!!!	Let It Be Blue		Warp	
May 6	Alison Wonderland	Loner		EMI Music Australia	
May 6	John Scofield	John Scofield	Jazz	ECM	
May 6	Arcade Fire	We	Folk rock, dance-pop	Columbia	
May 6	Bad Bunny	Un Verano Sin Ti	Reggaeton, cumbia, indie pop	Rimas	
May 6	Belle and Sebastian	A Bit of Previous		Matador	
May 6	Ella Mai	Heart on My Sleeve	R&B	10 Summers, Interscope	
May 6	Emeli Sandé	Let's Say for Instance	Classical, disco, R&B	Chrysalis	
May 6	The Feeling	Loss. Hope. Love.		Island	
May 6	Flor	Future Shine		Fueled by Ramen	
May 6	Fozzy	Boombox	Heavy metal, hard rock	Century Media	
May 6	Gabi DeMartino	Paintings of Me	Orchestral pop		
May 6	Halestorm	Back from the Dead	Heavy metal	Atlantic	
May 6	Hermitude	Mirror Mountain			
May 6	Ibeyi	Spell 31		XL	
May 6	IDK	Simple		Warner	
May 6	Jack Harlow	Come Home the Kids Miss You	Hip-hop	Atlantic	
May 6	Neil Young	Citizen Kane Jr. Blues (Live at The Bottom Line)		Shakey Pictures Records	
May 6	Neil Young	Dorothy Chandler Pavilion		Shakey Pictures Records	
May 6	Neil Young	Royce Hall		Shakey Pictures Records	
May 6	Otoboke Beaver	Super Champon	Punk rock, garage punk	Damnably	
May 6	Rolling Blackouts Coastal Fever	Endless Rooms	Indie rock, jangle pop, college rock	Ivy League, Sub Pop	
May 6	Sabrina Claudio	Based on a Feeling		Atlantic	
May 6	Screamfeeder	Five Rooms		Poison City	
May 6	Sharon Van Etten	We've Been Going About This All Wrong	Indie rock	Jagjaguwar	
May 6	Sigrid	How to Let Go	Pop	Island	
May 6	Silverstein	Misery Made Me	Post-hardcore	UNFD	
May 6	Simple Plan	Harder Than It Looks	Pop-punk	Simple Plan	
May 6	Soft Cell	Happiness Not Included	Synth-pop	BMG	
May 6	Stand Atlantic	F.E.A.R.		Hopeless	
May 6	Sunflower Bean	Headful of Sugar		Lucky Number	
May 6	Timothy B. Schmit	Day by Day			
May 6	Three Days Grace	Explosions	Hard rock, post-grunge, alternative metal	RCA	
May 6	Ufomammut	Fenice		Neurot Recordings	
May 6	Warpaint	Radiate Like This		Virgin	
May 6	The Waterboys	All Souls Hill	Folk rock	Cooking Vinyl	
May 6	Windwaker	Love Language		Fearless, Cooking Vinyl Australia	
May 9	Tomorrow X Together	Minisode 2: Thursday's Child	Rock, hip-hop, pop	BigHit, Republic	
May 11	Taichi Mukai	Antidote		Toy's Factory	
May 12	Ethel Cain	Preacher's Daughter	Americana, dark ambient, roots rock	Daughters of Cain Records	
May 13	Alaska Thunderfuck	Drag: The Musical (Studio Cast Recording)		PEG, Killingsworth, Craft	
May 13	Ayokay	Digital Dreamscape			
May 13	Bear's Den	Blue Hours	Folk rock, alternative rock	Communion	
May 13	Becky G	Esquemas			
May 13	The Black Keys	Dropout Boogie	Blues rock, garage rock	Nonesuch	
May 13	Brandon Lake	Help!	Contemporary worship	Tribl Records	
May 13	The Bros. Landreth	Come Morning		Birthday Cake Records	
May 13	The Chainsmokers	So Far So Good		Disruptor, Columbia	
May 13	Florence and the Machine	Dance Fever	Pop rock, baroque pop, progressive pop	Polydor	
May 13	Kendrick Lamar	Mr. Morale & the Big Steppers	Conscious hip-hop	Top Dawg	
May 13	Kevin Morby	This Is a Photograph		Dead Oceans	
May 13	Luke Steele	Listen to the Water		EMI Music Australia	
May 13	Mandy Moore	In Real Life	Indie pop, country	Verve Forecast	
May 13	Mary Halvorson	Amaryllis		Nonesuch	
May 13	Mary Halvorson	Belladonna		Nonesuch	
May 13	Moderat	More D4ta	Electronic, ambient, IDM	Monkeytown	
May 13	Obongjayar	Some Nights I Dream of Doors		September Recordings	
May 13	Quelle Chris	Deathfame	Hip-hop	MMG	
May 13	Sasha Alex Sloan	I Blame the World		RCA	
May 13	The Smile	A Light for Attracting Attention	Art rock, post-punk, progressive rock	XL	
May 13	Tank and the Bangas	Red Balloon		Verve Forecast	
May 13	They Hate Change	Finally, New		Jagjaguwar	
May 13	Two Feet	Shape & Form			
May 13	Visions of Atlantis	Pirates	Symphonic metal, power metal, pirate metal	Napalm	
May 18	Novelbright	Assort		Universal Sigma	
May 18	Static Dress	Rouge Carpet Disaster			
May 18	Tofubeats	Reflection	J-pop, Japanese hip-hop	Unborde	
May 20	Anvil	Impact Is Imminent			
May 20	Avi Kaplan	Floating on a Dream	Americana	Fantasy	
May 20	Craig Finn	A Legacy of Rentals		Positive Jams, Thirty Tigers	
May 20	Dave Stewart	Ebony McQueen		Bay Street Records	
May 20	Delta Spirit	One Is One		New West	
May 20	ericdoa	Things with Wings	Pop rap, hyperpop	Listen to the Kids, Interscope	
May 20	Everything Everything	Raw Data Feel		AWAL	
May 20	Flume	Palaces	Electronic	Future Classic	
May 20	Gavin DeGraw	Face the River	Pop	RCA	
May 20	Harry Styles	Harry's House	Pop rock, synth-pop	Columbia, Erskine Records	
May 20	Jordana	Face the Wall		Grand Jury Music	
May 20	Lykke Li	Eyeye	Bedroom pop	PIAS	
May 20	Mavis Staples and Levon Helm	Carry Me Home	Roots rock, rhythm and blues	Anti-	
May 20	Mxmtoon	Rising	Indie pop, disco-pop, electropop	AWAL	
May 20	Nitty Gritty Dirt Band	Dirt Does Dylan			
May 20	Porridge Radio	Waterslide, Diving Board, Ladder to the Sky		Secretly Canadian	
May 20	Ravyn Lenae	Hypnos	R&B, neo soul	Atlantic	
May 20	Soak	If I Never Know You Like This Again		Rough Trade	
May 20	Train	AM Gold		Columbia	
May 20	Uffie	Sunshine Factory		Company Records	
May 20	Van Morrison	What's It Gonna Take?	R&B	Exile Productions, Virgin	
May 20	Zach Bryan	American Heartbreak	Country	Belting Bronco Records, Warner	
May 25	JO1	Kizuna	J-pop	Lapone	
May 25	Man with a Mission	Break and Cross the Walls II		Sony Music	
May 27	700 Bliss	Nothing to Declare	Electronic, experimental, hip-hop	Hyperdub	
May 27	Alfie Templeman	Mellow Moon	Indie pop	Chess Club Records	
May 27	Conway the Machine	Organized Grime 2		Trillmatic Records	
May 27	Crematory	Inglorious Darkness		Napalm	
May 27	Decapitated	Cancer Culture	Technical death metal	Nuclear Blast	
May 27	Def Leppard	Diamond Star Halos	Glam rock	Bludgeon Riffola, Mercury	
May 27	Dehd	Blue Skies		Fat Possum	
May 27	Joakim Berg	Jag fortsätter glömma	Pop rock	UMG	
May 27	Just Mustard	Heart Under	Noise rock	Partisan	
May 27	Liam Gallagher	C'mon You Know	Alternative rock, psychedelic rock	Warner	
May 27	Liam Gallagher	Down by the River Thames		Warner	
May 27	Marina Satti	Yenna		Walnut Entertainment	
May 27	Mark Tremonti	Mark Tremonti Sings Frank Sinatra		Mark Tremonti Music	
May 27	Omar Rudberg	OMR			
May 27	Seventeen	Face the Sun	K-pop	Pledis	
May 27	Stars	From Capelton Hill	Indie pop, electropop, chamber pop	Last Gang, MNRK	
May 27	Steve Earle & The Dukes	Jerry Jeff		New West	
May 27	Tate McRae	I Used to Think I Could Fly	Pop, dance-pop	RCA	
May 27	Umi	Forest in the City		RCA	
May 27	Wilco	Cruel Country	Country	dBpm	
May 30	Cazzu	Nena trampa		Rimas Entertainment	
May 30	Christina Aguilera	La Tormenta	Latin	Sony Latin	
May 31	Christina Aguilera	Aguilera	Latin	Sony Latin	

=== June ===
List of albums released in June 2022
Go to: January | February | March | April | May | June | July | August | September | October | November | December | Back to top
Release date	Artist	Album	Genre	Label	Ref.
June 3	070 Shake	You Can't Kill Me	Hip-hop, R&B, electropop	GOOD, Def Jam	
June 3	Andrew Bird	Inside Problems		Loma Vista	
June 3	Angel Olsen	Big Time	Country	Jagjaguwar	
June 3	Bleed from Within	Shrine	Metalcore, groove metal, melodic death metal	Nuclear Blast	
June 3	Crobot	Feel This		Mascot	
June 3	Drive-By Truckers	Welcome 2 Club XIII	Southern rock	ATO	
June 3	Eleni Foureira	Poli Ploki	Pop	Panik Records	
June 3	Erica Dawn Lyle + Vice Cooler	Land Trust: Benefit for NEFOC			
June 3	Fantastic Negrito	White Jesus Black Problems	Blues, gospel, funk	Storefront Records	
June 3	Gwar	The New Dark Ages	Heavy metal	Pit Records	
June 3	Horsegirl	Versions of Modern Performance	Indie rock	Matador	
June 3	iamamiwhoami	Be Here Soon	Folktronica	To Whom It May Concern	
June 3	Memphis May Fire	Remade in Misery	Metalcore, alternative metal, post-hardcore	Rise	
June 3	Post Malone	Twelve Carat Toothache	Pop, dance-pop, R&B	Mercury, Republic	
June 3	Poliça	Madness		Memphis Industries	
June 3	Purity Ring	Graves		The Fellowship	
June 3	Shintaro Sakamoto	Like a Fable		Zelone Records, Secretly	
June 3	The Suffers	It Starts with Love		Missing Piece Records	
June 3	Tash Sultana	MTV Unplugged, Live in Melbourne		Lonely Lands Records, Sony Music Australia	
June 3	Tove Styrke	Hard		Sony Music Entertainment Sweden AB	
June 7	Mount Westmore	Mt. Westmore			
June 8	Haruka Fukuhara	Harukakanatae		Sony Music Japan	
June 9	Kelly Clarkson	Kellyoke	Pop, country	Atlantic	
June 10	μ-Ziq	Magic Pony Ride		Planet Mu	
June 10	Billy Howerdel	What Normal Was	Alternative rock, electronic rock	Alchemy Recordings, Rise, BMG	
June 10	Carrie Underwood	Denim & Rhinestones	Country	Columbia Nashville	
June 10	Dixie	A Letter to Me		Hitco	
June 10	Father	Young Hot Ebony 2		Awful Entertainment	
June 10	George Ezra	Gold Rush Kid		Columbia	
June 10	Joyce Manor	40 oz. to Fresno	Punk rock, indie rock, emo	Epitaph	
June 10	Judah & the Lion	Revival	Alternative rock	Cletus the Van Records, Virgin Music	
June 10	Kreator	Hate Über Alles	Thrash metal	Nuclear Blast	
June 10	Motionless in White	Scoring the End of the World	Industrial metal, metalcore, gothic metal	Roadrunner	
June 10	Neneh Cherry	The Versions	Pop, hip-hop	EMI	
June 10	Of Monsters and Men	Tíu		Republic	
June 10	The Range	Mercury		Domino	
June 10	Rise Against	Nowhere Generation II	Punk rock	Loma Vista	
June 10	Severe Torture	Fisting the Sockets		Season of Mist	
June 10	Shearwater	The Great Awakening		Polyborus Records	
June 10	Spacey Jane	Here Comes Everybody	Indie rock	Spacey Jane, AWAL	
June 10	Vance Joy	In Our Own Sweet Time	Folk pop	Liberation	
June 10	Will Joseph Cook	Every Single Thing		Bad Hotel	
June 10	The Wrecks	Sonder		Big Noise	
June 14	Self Esteem	Prima Facie (Original Theatre Soundtrack)	Electronic		
June 15	Ho6la	Sono Ichi		15Style Records	
June 17	Alanis Morissette	The Storm Before the Calm	Ambient	RCA	
June 17	Alice Merton	S.I.D.E.S.		Paper Planes, Mom + Pop	
June 17	Bartees Strange	Farm to Table	Indie rock	4AD	
June 17	Brett Eldredge	Songs About You	Country	Warner Music Nashville	
June 17	Calum Scott	Bridges		Capitol	
June 17	Dan Reed Network	Let's Hear It for the King			
June 17	Drake	Honestly, Nevermind	House, Baltimore club	OVO, Republic	
June 17	Flasher	Love Is Yours	Indie rock	Domino	
June 17	Foals	Life Is Yours	Dance-rock, disco	Warner, ADA	
June 17	Greg Puciato	Mirrorcell			
June 17	Hazel English	Summer Nights			
June 17	Hercules and Love Affair	In Amber		Skint, BMG	
June 17	IV and the Strange Band	Southern Circus			
June 17	Jessie Buckley and Bernard Butler	For All Our Days That Tear the Heart	Folk	EMI	
June 17	Krallice	Psychagogue			
June 17	Logic	Vinyl Days	Hip-hop	Def Jam	
June 17	Maverick City Music and Kirk Franklin	Kingdom Book One	Contemporary worship, contemporary gospel	Tribl Records, Fo Yo Soul Entertainment, RCA Inspiration	
June 17	Nick Cave	Seven Psalms			
June 17	Nova Twins	Supernova	Alternative rock, punk rock, rap rock	Marshall Records	
June 17	Perfume Genius	Ugly Season	Chamber pop, baroque pop, industrial	Matador	
June 17	Sound of Ceres	Emerald Sea		Joyful Noise	
June 17	TV Priest	My Other People	Post-punk, gothic rock, art punk	Sub Pop	
June 17	Westside Boogie	More Black Superheroes		Shady, Interscope	
June 17	Yaya Bey	Remember Your North Star		Big Dada	
June 20	Kep1er	Doublast	Punk, house	Swing, Wake One	
June 20	Loona	Flip That	K-pop	Blockberry Creative	
June 21	Weezer	SZNZ: Summer	Alternative rock, power pop, heavy metal	Atlantic, Crush	
June 22	Imperial Triumphant	Spirit of Ecstasy		Century Media	
June 22	Stray Kids	Circus	Hip-hop, trap	Epic Japan	
June 24	Alestorm	Seventh Rum of a Seventh Rum	Pirate metal, power metal, folk metal	Napalm	
June 24	Alexisonfire	Otherness	Post-hardcore, neo-psychedelia	Dine Alone	
June 24	Chris Brown	Breezy	R&B, trap, soul	RCA	
June 24	Coheed and Cambria	Vaxis – Act II: A Window of the Waking Mind		Roadrunner	
June 24	Conan Gray	Superache	Pop	Republic	
June 24	Day Wave	Pastlife	Dream pop, indie rock	PIAS	
June 24	Empress Of	Save Me		Majora Arcana	
June 24	Giveon	Give or Take	R&B, soul	Not So Fast, Epic	
June 24	Goose	Dripfield	Indie rock, jam band	No Coincidence Records	
June 24	Jack Johnson	Meet the Moonlight	Rock	Brushfire, Universal	
June 24	Katy Nichole	Katy Nichole	CCM	Centricity Music	
June 24	Kristian Bush	52 | In the Key of Summer	Country	Big Machine	
June 24	Left at London	Transgender Street Legend Volume 3			
June 24	Luke Combs	Growin' Up	Country	Columbia, River House	
June 24	Lupe Fiasco	Drill Music in Zion	Conscious hip-hop, jazz rap	1st & 15th, Thirty Tigers	
June 24	Muna	Muna	Synth-pop	Saddest Factory, Dead Oceans	
June 24	Nervus	The Evil One		Get Better	
June 24	Petrol Girls	Baby		Hassle	
June 24	Porcupine Tree	Closure/Continuation	Progressive rock	Music For Nations	
June 24	Regina Spektor	Home, Before and After		Warner	
June 24	Soccer Mommy	Sometimes, Forever	Indie rock	Loma Vista	
June 24	Stealing Sheep	Wow Machine		Both Sides Records	
June 24	The Tragically Hip	Live at the Roxy	Rock	Universal Music Canada	
June 24	Trixie Mattel	The Blonde & Pink Albums	Power pop, pop rock, alternative rock	PEG	
June 24	Various artists	Elvis (Original Motion Picture Soundtrack)	Pop, rock and roll, jazz	RCA	
June 24	The Warning	Error	Rock	Lava, Republic	
June 24	Zola Jesus	Arkhon		Sacred Bones	
June 25	Greet Death	New Low			
June 29	NGT48	Unfinished Future			

== Third quarter ==
=== July ===
List of albums released in July 2022
Go to: January | February | March | April | May | June | July | August | September | October | November | December | Back to top
Release date	Artist	Album	Genre	Label	Ref.
July 1	Blood Command	Praise Armageddonism		Hassle	
July 1	The Dear Hunter	Antimai		Cave and Canary Goods	
July 1	Derek Sherinian	Vortex	Instrumental rock, progressive rock, progressive metal	Inside Out Music	
July 1	Fresh	Raise Hell		Specialist Subject	
July 1	Guided by Voices	Tremblers and Goggles by Rank	Indie rock, progressive rock	Rockathon Records	
July 1	Gwenno	Tresor	Psychedelic pop, baroque pop	Heavenly	
July 1	Imagine Dragons	Mercury – Act 2		Kidinakorner, Interscope	
July 1	Momma	Household Name		Polyvinyl, Lucky Number Records	
July 1	Moor Mother	Jazz Codes		Anti-	
July 1	Municipal Waste	Electrified Brain	Crossover thrash	Nuclear Blast	
July 1	Paolo Nutini	Last Night in the Bittersweet		Atlantic	
July 1	Shinedown	Planet Zero		Atlantic	
July 1	Various artists	Minions: The Rise of Gru (Original Motion Picture Soundtrack)	Pop, funk, soul	Decca, Verve	
July 6	Coldrain	Nonnegative	Post-hardcore, alternative metal	Warner Music	
July 7	Kali Malone	Living Torch	Electroacoustic	Portraits GRM	
July 8	Aespa	Girls	Dance-pop	SM	
July 8	Blind Channel	Lifestyles of the Sick & Dangerous		Century Media	
July 8	Brent Faiyaz	Wasteland	R&B	Lost Kids	
July 8	Burna Boy	Love, Damini	Afro-fusion	Atlantic	
July 8	Caterina Barbieri	Spirit Exit	Electronic, experimental	Light-Years	
July 8	The Faim	Talk Talk		BMG	
July 8	Flo	The Lead	R&B	Island	
July 8	Foxing	Live at the Grandel		Hopeless	
July 8	James Bay	Leap		Republic	
July 8	Jawbox	The Revisionist EP			
July 8	Journey	Freedom		BMG, Frontiers	
July 8	Ken Carson	X	Rage	Opium, Interscope	
July 8	Laura Veirs	Found Light	Folk	Bella Union	
July 8	Metric	Formentera	Indie rock, synth-pop, dream pop	Metric Music International, Thirty Tigers	
July 8	Mrs. Green Apple	Unity		EMI Japan	
July 8	Neil Young and Crazy Horse	Toast	Rock	Reprise	
July 8	Party Dozen	The Real Work		Temporary Residence	
July 8	Powerwolf	The Monumental Mass – A Cinematic Metal Event		Napalm	
July 8	Rae Morris	Rachel@Fairyland			
July 8	Renforshort	Dear Amelia	Pop rock, alternative pop	Interscope	
July 8	Tasman Keith	A Colour Undone		AWAL	
July 8	Tyshawn Sorey Trio	Mesmerism	Jazz	The Bunker, Bass Hit	
July 8	Viagra Boys	Cave World		Year0001	
July 8	Westside Gunn	Peace "Fly" God		Griselda	
July 8	Wet	Pink Room		Friends Of, Secretly Canadian	
July 8	Wu-Lu	Loggerhead		Warp	
July 8	Yuna	Y3		Yuna Room Records	
July 11	Chung Ha	Bare & Rare	Pop	MNH	
July 13	Alexandros	But wait. Cats?	Alternative rock, pop-punk, J-pop	Universal Japan, RX-Records	
July 13	Naniwa Danshi	1st Love	J-pop	J Storm	
July 14	Ian Sweet	Star Stuff		Polyvinyl	
July 15	Alan Parsons	From the New World	Progressive rock	Frontiers	
July 15	...And You Will Know Us by the Trail of Dead	XI: Bleed Here Now		Inside Out, Dine Alone	
July 15	Beabadoobee	Beatopia		Dirty Hit	
July 15	Belief (Stella Mozgawa and Boom Bip)	Belief	Electronic, house	Lex	
July 15	Black Midi	Hellfire	Experimental rock, progressive rock, jazz fusion	Rough Trade	
July 15	Chicago	Chicago XXXVIII: Born for This Moment			
July 15	Deaf Havana	The Present Is a Foreign Land		So Recordings	
July 15	DJ Premier	Hip Hop 50: Vol 1		Mass Appeal	
July 15	Interpol	The Other Side of Make-Believe	Post-punk revival	Matador	
July 15	Itzy	Checkmate		JYP, Republic	
July 15	J-Hope	Jack in the Box	Old-school hip-hop	Big Hit	
July 15	Jeff Beck and Johnny Depp	18	Rock	Rhino	
July 15	Lil Silva	Yesterday Is Heavy		Nowhere Music	
July 15	Lizzo	Special		Nice Life, Atlantic	
July 15	Lloyd Banks	The Course of the Inevitable 2	East Coast hip-hop	Money By Any Means, Empire	
July 15	Mabel	About Last Night...		Polydor	
July 15	Mantar	Pain Is Forever and This Is the End		Metal Blade	
July 15	Ne-Yo	Self Explanatory	R&B	Motown, Compound Entertainment	
July 15	Rexx Life Raj	The Blue Hour		Empire	
July 15	Rowdy Rebel	Rowdy Vs. Rebel		Epic	
July 15	Sabrina Carpenter	Emails I Can't Send	Pop music, folk-pop	Island	
July 15	Senses Fail	Hell Is in Your Head		Pure Noise	
July 15	Steve Lacy	Gemini Rights	R&B, funk, psychedelic	L-M, RCA	
July 15	Superorganism	World Wide Pop	Indie pop	Domino	
July 15	Yours Truly	Is This What I Look Like?		UNFD	
July 20	Dempagumi.inc	Dempark!!!		Lantis	
July 20	Flo Milli	You Still Here, Ho?	Trap, bounce, hip-hop	RCA	
July 20	Hyuna	Nabillera	K-pop	P Nation	
July 20	Yuki Yomichi	First Snow First Love			
July 21	Billie Eilish	Guitar Songs		Darkroom, Interscope	
July 21	Julien Baker	B-Sides		Matador	
July 22	Alex the Astronaut	How to Grow a Sunflower Underwater		Warner Music Australia	
July 22	Bananarama	Masquerade		In Synk	
July 22	Beach Bunny	Emotional Creature		Mom + Pop Music	
July 22	Cuco	Fantasy Gateway		Interscope	
July 22	Jack White	Entering Heaven Alive	Folk rock	Third Man	
July 22	Jamie T	The Theory of Whatever	Alternative rock, indie rock	Polydor	
July 22	Joey Badass	2000	Hip-hop	Pro Era, Cinematic Music	
July 22	The Koreatown Oddity	Isthisforreal?	Hip-hop	Stones Throw	
July 22	Nina Nastasia	Riderless Horse		Temporary Residence	
July 22	Oceans of Slumber	Starlight and Ash		Century Media	
July 22	Odesza	The Last Goodbye		Ninja Tune, Foreign Family Collective	
July 22	Palisades	Reaching Hypercritical		Rise	
July 22	Rico Nasty	Las Ruinas		Sugar Trap, Atlantic	
July 22	The Sadies	Colder Streams	Country rock, alternative country, psychedelic rock	Dine Alone, Yep Roc	
July 22	She & Him	Melt Away: A Tribute to Brian Wilson	Rock	Fantasy	
July 22	Stan Walker	All In		Sony Music New Zealand	
July 22	Ty Segall	Hello, Hi		Drag City	
July 27	Perfume	Plasma	J-pop	Universal J	
July 27	Twice	Celebrate		Warner Music Japan	
July 27	Zico	Grown Ass Kid		KOZ	
July 29	Amanda Shires	Take It Like a Man	Country, folk	ATO	
July 29	Ateez	The World EP.1: Movement	K-pop	KQ Entertainment	
July 29	Beddy Rays	Beddy Rays		Beddy Rays	
July 29	Beyoncé	Renaissance		Parkwood, Columbia	
July 29	Chat Pile	God's Country	Noise rock, sludge metal	The Flenser	
July 29	Domi and JD Beck	Not Tight	Jazz fusion	Apeshit Inc.	
July 29	Dance Gavin Dance	Jackpot Juicer		Rise	
July 29	Dune Rats	Real Rare Whale		Ratbag, BMG	
July 29	Friendship	Love the Stranger	Americana	Merge	
July 29	Hayley Kiyoko	Panorama		Empire, Atlantic	
July 29	Ithaca	They Fear Us	Metalcore	Hassle	
July 29	King Princess	Hold On Baby		Zelig	
July 29	Krisiun	Mortem Solis		Century Media	
July 29	Maggie Rogers	Surrender	Indie pop, alternative pop, electropop	Capitol	
July 29	Of Montreal	Freewave Lucifer F<ck F^ck F>ck	Dance-rock	Polyvinyl	
July 29	Ronnie Dunn	100 Proof Neon	Country	Little Will-E Records	
July 29	Warren Hue	Boy of the Year		88rising	
July 29	Whiskey Myers	Tornillo	Country, Southern rock	Wiggy Thump Records	
July 29	Wiz Khalifa	Multiverse	Hip-hop, R&B, pop	Taylor Gang, Asylum	

=== August ===
List of albums released in August 2022
Go to: January | February | March | April | May | June | July | August | September | October | November | December | Back to top
Release date	Artist	Album	Genre	Label	Ref.
August 1	NewJeans	New Jeans	Pop	ADOR, YG Plus	
August 3	Sakurazaka46	As You Know?		Sony Music Japan	
August 3	Tokyo Girls' Style	Nocturnal		Avex Trax	
August 4	Fireboy DML	Playboy	Afrobeats	YBNL Nation, Empire	
August 4	Lou Phelps	Touché		Celestial Morals, Stand Up Guy Records	
August 5	Amon Amarth	The Great Heathen Army	Melodic death metal	Metal Blade	
August 5	Art vs. Science	Big Overdrive			
August 5	Black Party	Hummingbird	R&B, soul	Wolf + Rothstein, RCA	
August 5	Bobby Shmurda	Bodboy	Hip-hop	GS9	
August 5	Calvin Harris	Funk Wav Bounces Vol. 2	Post-disco	Columbia	
August 5	Doechii	She / Her / Black Bitch		Top Dawg Entertainment, Capitol	
August 5	Dub War	Westgate Under Fire	Reggae, punk rock	Earache	
August 5	Girls' Generation	Forever 1	K-pop	SM	
August 5	King Stingray	King Stingray		Cooking Vinyl	
August 5	Lauv	All 4 Nothing		Virgin	
August 5	Planet Drum	In the Groove	World	Valley Entertainment	
August 5	Pussy Riot	Matriarchy Now	Dance-pop, hyperpop	Neon Gold	
August 5	Soulfly	Totem	Thrash metal, groove metal, death metal	Nuclear Blast	
August 5	The Interrupters	In the Wild		Hellcat, Epitaph	
August 5	YoungBoy Never Broke Again	The Last Slimeto	Hip-hop	Never Broke Again, Atlantic	
August 10	Ado	Uta's Songs: One Piece Film Red	Anisong, J-pop	Virgin	
August 10	B.O.L.T	Weather			
August 10	B'z	Highway X	Hard rock	Vermillion	
August 12	Arch Enemy	Deceivers	Melodic death metal	Century Media	
August 12	Bella Poarch	Dolls		Warner	
August 12	Boris	Heavy Rocks	Heavy metal, stoner rock	Relapse	
August 12	Collective Soul	Vibrating	Pop rock	Fuzze-Flex	
August 12	Danger Mouse and Black Thought	Cheat Codes	Hip-hop	BMG	
August 12	Danny Elfman	Bigger. Messier.		Anti-, Epitaph	
August 12	Destroy Lonely	No Stylist	Hip-hop, trap, rage	Opium	
August 12	Erasure	Day-Glo (Based on a True Story)		Mute	
August 12	The Game	Drillmatic – Heart vs. Mind	Hip-hop	100 Entertainment, MNRK Music Group	
August 12	Goo Goo Dolls	Chaos in Bloom	Alternative rock, pop rock	Warner	
August 12	Hollywood Undead	Hotel Kalifornia		BMG	
August 12	Hudson Mohawke	Cry Sugar	Dance, electronic	Warp	
August 12	Kasabian	The Alchemist's Euphoria	Rock, techno, progressive rock	Sony Music	
August 12	Megan Thee Stallion	Traumazine	Hip-hop	1501 Certified, 300	
August 12	Niki	Nicole	Alternative pop, folk-pop	88rising	
August 12	Norma Jean	Deathrattle Sing for Me	Metalcore	Solid State	
August 12	Osees	A Foul Form		Castle Face	
August 12	Pale Waves	Unwanted	Pop-punk	Dirty Hit	
August 12	Panda Bear and Sonic Boom	Reset		Domino	
August 12	Rod Wave	Beautiful Mind		Alamo	
August 12	Sykamore	Pinto	Country pop		
August 12	Sylvan Esso	No Rules Sandy		Loma Vista	
August 12	Tony Molina	In the Fade	Power pop, indie rock, folk pop	Summer Shade, Run for Cover	
August 15	Holding Absence and Alpha Wolf	The Lost & the Longing		SharpTone, Greyscale Records	
August 17	Aimyon	Falling into Your Eyes Record		Unborde	
August 17	The World Standard	We Are Cats			
August 19	Aitch	Close to Home	Hip-hop	Capitol	
August 19	Bear McCreary	The Lord of the Rings: The Rings of Power (Season One: Amazon Original Series Soundtrack)			
August 19	Cass McCombs	Heartmind	Americana, folk rock	Anti-	
August 19	The Chats	Get Fucked	Punk rock, pub rock	Bargain Bin Records	
August 19	Circa Waves	Hell on Earth		Lower Third	
August 19	Demi Lovato	Holy Fvck	Pop-punk, hard rock	Island	
August 19	Five Finger Death Punch	AfterLife	Alternative metal, groove metal	Better Noise	
August 19	Hot Chip	Freakout/Release	Alternative dance	Domino	
August 19	I Prevail	True Power	Metalcore, post-hardcore, rap metal	Fearless	
August 19	Jaimin	Cutting Loose	Soft rock, indie folk	The Orchard	
August 19	Johnny Orlando	All the Things That Could Go Wrong		Republic, Universal Music Canada	
August 19	Larry June	Spaceships on the Blade			
August 19	Lauran Hibberd	Garageband Superstar	Pop rock	Virgin Music	
August 19	Madonna	Finally Enough Love: 50 Number Ones	Dance	Warner	
August 19	Markéta Irglová	Lila			
August 19	The Mountain Goats	Bleed Out	Alternative rock	Merge	
August 19	Oneida	Success		Joyful Noise	
August 19	Panic! at the Disco	Viva Las Vengeance	Pop rock, glam rock, power pop	Fueled by Ramen, DCD2	
August 19	Röyksopp	Profound Mysteries II		Dog Triumph	
August 19	Russian Circles	Gnosis	Post-metal, instrumental rock, post-rock	Sargent House	
August 19	Silversun Pickups	Physical Thrills	Indie rock, alternative rock	New Machine Recordings	
August 19	Soilwork	Övergivenheten	Melodic death metal	Nuclear Blast	
August 19	Szun Waves	Earth Patterns		The Leaf Label	
August 19	Tank	R&B Money	R&B	R&B Money, Atlantic	
August 19	Terence Etc.	Vortex		Brainfeeder	
August 19	Tink	Pillow Talk	Pop, R&B	Winter's Diary, Empire	
August 19	Watkins Family Hour	Vol. II		Family Hour Records	
August 21	Melvins	Bad Mood Rising	Sludge metal	Amphetamine Reptile	
August 24	Mdou Moctar	Niger EP Vol. 1			
August 26	Becoming the Archetype	Children of the Great Extinction	Progressive metal, melodic death metal, Christian metal	Solid State	
August 26	Blackbear	In Loving Memory	Pop-punk	Alamo, Columbia	
August 26	Bret McKenzie	Songs Without Jokes		Sub Pop	
August 26	Diamanda Galás	Broken Gargoyles		Intravenal Sound Operations	
August 26	Dirty Heads	Midnight Control		Better Noise Music	
August 26	DJ Khaled	God Did	Hip-hop, trap	We the Best, Epic	
August 26	Embrace	How to Be a Person Like Other People	Alternative rock	Mo'betta	
August 26	Ezra Furman	All of Us Flames		Anti-	
August 26	Grave Digger	Symbol of Eternity	Heavy metal, power metal	Napalm	
August 26	Ingrid Andress	Good Person	Country pop	Warner Music Nashville	
August 26	JID	The Forever Story	Alternative hip-hop	Dreamville, Interscope	
August 26	Julia Jacklin	Pre Pleasure		Polyvinyl	
August 26	Kaitlyn Aurelia Smith	Let's Turn It into Sound	Electronic	Ghostly International	
August 26	Laufey	Everything I Know About Love	Jazz pop	AWAL	
August 26	Mach-Hommy	Dollar Menu 4			
August 26	Machine Head	Of Kingdom and Crown	Groove metal, thrash metal, alternative metal	Nuclear Blast	
August 26	Marcus King	Young Blood	Blues rock	American, Republic	
August 26	Mark Tuan	The Other Side		DNA Records	
August 26	Meechy Darko	Gothic Luxury		Loma Vista	
August 26	Muse	Will of the People		Warner	
August 26	Pantha du Prince	Garden Gaia		Modern Recordings	
August 26	Roc Marciano and The Alchemist	The Elephant Man's Bones	Hip-hop	Pimpire, ALC Records	
August 26	Ry X	Blood Moon			
August 26	Sigh	Shiki		Peaceville	
August 26	Stella Donnelly	Flood	Indie rock	Secretly Canadian	
August 26	Twice	Between 1&2	K-pop	JYP	
August 30	Key	Gasoline	K-pop	SM	
August 31	Ari Lennox	Away Message		Dreamville	
August 31	Be:First	BE: 1		BMSG	
August 31	Billlie	The Billage of Perception: Chapter Two		Mystic Story	
August 31	Kenny Beats	Louie	G-funk, instrumental hip-hop	XL	

=== September ===
List of albums released in September 2022
Go to: January | February | March | April | May | June | July | August | September | October | November | December | Back to top
Release date	Artist	Album	Genre	Label	Ref.
September 2	Bitchin Bajas	Bajascillators		Drag City	
September 2	Blind Guardian	The God Machine	Power metal	Nuclear Blast	
September 2	The Butterfly Effect	IV			
September 2	The Callous Daoboys	Celebrity Therapist		MNRK	
September 2	Cryalot	Icarus	Noise, metal, experimental pop	AWAL	
September 2	The Front Bottoms	Theresa		Elektra	
September 2	The Hu	Rumble of Thunder	Folk metal	Better Noise	
September 2	Isabella Manfredi	Izzi		Island	
September 2	Jon Pardi	Mr. Saturday Night	Neotraditional country	Capitol Nashville	
September 2	King's X	Three Sides of One	Hard rock, progressive metal	Inside Out, Sony Music	
September 2	Megadeth	The Sick, the Dying... and the Dead!	Thrash metal	Tradecraft, Universal	
September 2	Miss May I	Curse of Existence	Metalcore	SharpTone	
September 2	Montaigne	Making It!		Wonderlick Entertainment, Sony	
September 2	Nina Nesbitt	Älskar	Electronic pop, Scandipop	Cooking Vinyl	
September 2	Pi'erre Bourne	Good Movie			
September 2	Romeo Santos	Formula, Vol. 3		Sony Music Latin	
September 2	Tom Chaplin	Midpoint		BMG	
September 2	Two Door Cinema Club	Keep on Smiling	Indie pop, synth-pop, indie rock	Lower Third, Glassnote	
September 2	Yungblud	Yungblud	Pop rock	Locomotion, Geffen	
September 6	Camilo	De Adentro Pa' Afuera		Hecho a Mano, Sony Music Latin	
September 6	YoungBoy Never Broke Again	Realer 2			
September 8	The Garden	Horseshit on Route 66		Epitaph	
September 9	The Afghan Whigs	How Do You Burn?	Classic rock, classic pop, psychedelic rock	BMG, Royal Cream Records	
September 9	Ari Lennox	Age/Sex/Location	R&B, soul, neo soul	Dreamville, Interscope	
September 9	Badge Époque Ensemble	Clouds of Joy		Telephone Explosion	
September 9	Breland	Cross Country			
September 9	Built to Spill	When the Wind Forgets Your Name		Sub Pop	
September 9	Charles Stepney	Step on Step		International Anthem	
September 9	Eden	ICYMI			
September 9	Flogging Molly	Anthem	Celtic punk	Rise	
September 9	Greentea Peng	Greenzone 108		EMI	
September 9	Hardwell	Rebels Never Die	Future rave, techno	Revealed	
September 9	Highly Suspect	The Midnight Demon Club		Roadrunner	
September 9	Jockstrap	I Love You Jennifer B	Art pop	Rough Trade	
September 9	John Legend	Legend		Republic	
September 9	Joshua Redman, Brad Mehldau, Christian McBride, and Brian Blade	LongGone	Jazz	Nonesuch	
September 9	Julian Lennon	Jude	Rock, pop	BMG	
September 9	Kane Brown	Different Man	Country	RCA Nashville	
September 9	KMFDM	Hyëna		Metropolis	
September 9	KT Tunstall	Nut	Pop rock	EMI	
September 9	Madison Cunningham	Revealer	Folk rock	Verve Forecast	
September 9	The Midnight	Heroes	Synthwave	Counter Records	
September 9	Miya Folick	2007		Nettwerk	
September 9	Nav	Demons Protected by Angels		XO, Republic	
September 9	Oliver Sim	Hideous Bastard		Young	
September 9	One Ok Rock	Luxury Disease	Rock, alternative rock	Fueled by Ramen	
September 9	Ozzy Osbourne	Patient Number 9	Heavy metal, hard rock	Epic	
September 9	Parkway Drive	Darker Still	Heavy metal, nu metal	Resist Records, Epitaph	
September 9	Preoccupations	Arrangements	Post-punk	Flemish Eye	
September 9	Robbie Williams	XXV		Columbia	
September 9	Sampa the Great	As Above, So Below	Rap, R&B	Loma Vista	
September 9	Santigold	Spirituals		Little Jerk Records	
September 9	Sudan Archives	Natural Brown Prom Queen		Stones Throw	
September 9	The Summer Set	Blossom, Pt 1			
September 9	Totally Enormous Extinct Dinosaurs	When the Lights Go		Nice Age	
September 9	Yeat	Lyfe	Rage, trap	Field Trip, Geffen, Twizzy Rich	
September 14	Feid	Feliz Cumpleaños Ferxxo Te Pirateamos el Álbum	Reggaeton, Latin trap	Universal Music Latin	
September 16	Behemoth	Opvs Contra Natvram	Blackened death metal	Nuclear Blast	
September 16	The Beths	Expert in a Dying Field		Carpark	
September 16	Blackpink	Born Pink	Pop, hip-hop, rock	YG	
September 16	Blaqk Audio	Trop d'amour			
September 16	Blood Orange	Four Songs		RCA	
September 16	Clutch	Sunrise on Slaughter Beach	Stoner rock, hard rock, blues rock	Weathermaker	
September 16	Cosey Fanni Tutti	Delia Derbyshire: The Myths and the Legendary Tapes		Conspiracy International	
September 16	Creedence Clearwater Revival	At the Royal Albert Hall	Swamp rock	Craft, Fantasy	
September 16	Daniela Lalita	Trececerotres	Folktronica, art pop	Young	
September 16	Death Cab for Cutie	Asphalt Meadows	Indie rock, indie pop, post-punk	Atlantic	
September 16	The Devil Wears Prada	Color Decay	Metalcore	Solid State	
September 16	Djo	Decide	Synth-pop		
September 16	Electric Callboy	Tekkno	Metalcore, pop, electronica	Century Media	
September 16	Eliza	A Sky Without Stars		Different	
September 16	EST Gee	I Never Felt Nun	Hip-hop	Interscope, CMG, Warlike	
September 16	Fletcher	Girl of My Dreams		Capitol	
September 16	Imanu	Unfold		Deadbeats	
September 16	Infected Mushroom	IM25		Monstercat	
September 16	Jessie Reyez	Yessie		FMLY, Island	
September 16	Ka	Languish Arts			
September 16	Ka	Woeful Studies			
September 16	LeAnn Rimes	God's Work		EverLe Records	
September 16	Lissie	Carving Canyons		Lionboy Records	
September 16	Little Big Town	Mr. Sun		Capitol Nashville	
September 16	Little Dragon	Opening the Door		Ninja Tune	
September 16	Maggie Lindemann	Suckerpunch	Pop-punk, rock	Swixxzaudio, Virgin	
September 16	Marcus Mumford	Self-Titled		Island	
September 16	The Mars Volta	The Mars Volta	Psychedelic rock, progressive pop, alternative rock	Clouds Hill	
September 16	Meg Mac	Matter of Time		EMI Music Australia	
September 16	Mel Parsons	Slow Burn	Indie folk, country rock	Cape Road Recordings	
September 16	Michelle Branch	The Trouble with Fever	Pop, rock	Audio Eagle, Nonesuch	
September 16	Mitchell Tenpenny	This Is the Heavy	Country	Riser House, Columbia Nashville, Sony Music Nashville	
September 16	Mura Masa	Demon Time		Polydor	
September 16	The Murlocs	Rapscallion		ATO	
September 16	NCT 127	2 Baddies	R&B, hip-hop	SM	
September 16	No Age	People Helping People		Drag City	
September 16	No Devotion	No Oblivion	Alternative rock	Velocity	
September 16	Noah Cyrus	The Hardest Part	Country-soul, acoustic pop	Records, Columbia	
September 16	The Proclaimers	Dentures Out	Rock	Cooking Vinyl	
September 16	Rina Sawayama	Hold the Girl	Pop, pop rock, dance-pop	Dirty Hit	
September 16	Starcrawler	She Said	Alternative rock	Big Machine	
September 16	Steve Aoki	Hiroquest: Genesis		Dim Mak	
September 16	Suede	Autofiction		BMG	
September 16	We the Kingdom	We the Kingdom	CCM	Capitol CMG	
September 16	Wolfheart	King of the North	Melodic death metal	Napalm	
September 16	Young Jesus	Shepherd Head		Saddle Creek	
September 21	Band-Maid	Unleash		Pony Canyon	
September 21	Jay B	Be Yourself	Funk, hip-hop, R&B	CDNZA Records	
September 21	Silvana Estrada	Abrazo		Glassnote	
September 21	Sumika	For.		Sony Music Japan	
September 22	Slander	Thrive			
September 22	Weezer	SZNZ: Autumn	Dance-rock, power pop	Atlantic, Crush	
September 23	5 Seconds of Summer	5SOS5		BMG	
September 23	Alaska Thunderfuck	Red 4 Filth		Producer Entertainment	
September 23	Alex G	God Save the Animals		Domino	
September 23	Aristocrat of Bands	The Urban Hymnal	Gospel		
September 23	Beth Orton	Weather Alive		Partisan	
September 23	Big Scary	Me and You		Pieater	
September 23	Billy Idol	The Cage	Punk rock	Dark Horse	
September 23	Buzzcocks	Sonics in the Soul	Pop-punk, power pop	Cherry Red	
September 23	Cam'ron and A-Trak	U Wasn't There		Empire	
September 23	Caroline Shaw and Attacca Quartet	Evergreen		Nonesuch	
September 23	Courting	Guitar Music	Post-punk, hyperpop	PIAS	
September 23	The Comet Is Coming	Hyper-Dimensional Expansion Beam	Jazz	Impulse!	
September 23	D-Block Europe	Lap 5		D-Block Europe	
September 23	Dr. John	Things Happen That Way	Blues rock	Rounder	
September 23	Editors	EBM	Pop	PIAS	
September 23	Grateful Dead	In and Out of the Garden: Madison Square Garden '81, '82, '83	Rock	Rhino	
September 23	The Isley Brothers	Make Me Say It Again, Girl			
September 23	James and the Shame	Human Overboard	Country	Recondite But Cordial Records	
September 23	Joshua Bassett	Sad Songs in a Hotel Room		Warner	
September 23	Kelsea Ballerini	Subject to Change	Country pop	Black River	
September 23	KEN mode	Null		Artoffact	
September 23	Khruangbin and Vieux Farka Touré	Ali	Psychedelic rock, blues	Dead Oceans	
September 23	Maddie & Tae	Through the Madness, Vol. 2			
September 23	Makaya McCraven	In These Times	Jazz	International Anthem, Nonesuch, XL	
September 23	Marisa Anderson	Still, Here	Blues, folk	Thrill Jockey	
September 23	Maya Hawke	Moss		Mom + Pop	
September 23	Muni Long	Public Displays of Affection: The Album			
September 23	New Riders of the Purple Sage	Lyceum '72	Country rock	Omnivore	
September 23	Nikki Lane	Denim & Diamonds	Country	New West	
September 23	Nils Frahm	Music for Animals		Leiter	
September 23	Protoje	Third Time's the Charm		In.Digg.Nation Collective, RCA	
September 23	The Rasmus	Rise		Playground Music	
September 23	The Soft Moon	Exister	Post-punk, darkwave	Sacred Bones	
September 23	Sports Team	Gulp!		Island	
September 23	The Tallest Man on Earth	Too Late for Edelweiss		Anti-	
September 23	Tamino	Sahar			
September 23	Tim Burgess	Typical Music		Bella Union	
September 23	Tirzah	Highgrade		Domino	
September 23	Tyson Motsenbocker	Milk Teeth		Tooth & Nail	
September 23	Vök	Vök		Nettwerk	
September 23	The Wonder Years	The Hum Goes on Forever	Emo, pop-punk, alternative rock	The Loneliest Place on Earth, Hopeless	
September 26	Whitney	Spark		Secretly Canadian	
September 27	Rita Wilson	Now & Forever: Duets		Sing It Loud, The Orchard	
September 28	Beyooooonds	Beyooooo2nds		Zetima	
September 28	Brandi Carlile	In the Canyon Haze	Acoustic		
September 29	Black Market Karma	Aped Flair and Hijacked Ideas		Flower Power Records	
September 30	Afroman	Lemon Pound Cake	Hip-hop	Hungry Hustler Records	
September 30	Ashley McBryde	Lindeville	Country	Warner Music Nashville	
September 30	Autopsy	Morbidity Triumphant	Death metal	Peaceville	
September 30	Baby Tate	Mani/Pedi	R&B, rap	Warner	
September 30	The Big Pink	The Love That's Ours			
September 30	Billy Woods	Church	Hip-hop	Backwoodz Studioz	
September 30	Björk	Fossora	Avant-pop, techno, industrial	One Little Independent	
September 30	Bladee	Spiderr	Pop, hip-hop	Year0001	
September 30	Buddy Guy	The Blues Don't Lie	Blues	RCA	
September 30	Christopher Tin	The Lost Birds		Decca Classics	
September 30	City of Caterpillar	Mystic Sisters		Relapse	
September 30	Cody Carnes	God Is Good!	Contemporary worship	Sparrow	
September 30	Craig David	22	R&B	TS5 Label, Moore Records	
September 30	Dodie	Hot Mess	Pop	Doddleoddle	
September 30	Drakeo the Ruler	Keep the Truth Alive			
September 30	Dropkick Murphys	This Machine Still Kills Fascists	Folk rock, Americana	Dummy Luck Music	
September 30	Drowning Pool	Strike a Nerve	Alternative metal, groove metal	T-Boy Records, UMe	
September 30	Freddie Gibbs	Soul Sold Separately	Hip-hop	Warner	
September 30	Gabriels	Angels & Queens – Part I	Soul	Atlas Artists, Parlophone	
September 30	Herb Alpert	Sunny Side of the Street			
September 30	Icon for Hire	The Reckoning		Kartel Music Group	
September 30	Javiera Mena	Nocturna	Latin pop, dance-pop, Italo disco	Meni, Sonido Muchacho	
September 30	Joss Stone	Merry Christmas, Love	Christmas, soul, R&B	S-Curve	
September 30	Kid Cudi	Entergalactic	Alternative R&B, alternative hip-hop	Wicked Awesome, Republic	
September 30	Kristian Bush	52 | New Blue	Country, rock	Big Machine	
September 30	Lambchop	The Bible		Merge, City Slang	
September 30	Lost Society	If the Sky Came Down	Metalcore, groove metal, nu metal	Nuclear Blast	
September 30	Magma	Kartëhl	Zeuhl, soul jazz, progressive rock		
September 30	Mamalarky	Pocket Fantasy		Fire Talk Records	
September 30	Mamaleek	Diner Coffee		The Flenser	
September 30	Melody's Echo Chamber	Unfold		Fat Possum	
September 30	Off!	Free LSD	Hardcore punk, psychedelic rock	Fat Possum	
September 30	Pixey	Dreams, Pains & Paper Planes		Chess Club	
September 30	Pixies	Doggerel	Rock	BMG	
September 30	Pretty Sick	Makes Me Sick Makes Me Smile		Dirty Hit	
September 30	Raven	Leave 'Em Bleeding		SPV/Steamhammer	
September 30	Richard Marx	Songwriter	Pop, rock, country	BMG	
September 30	Sammy Hagar and the Circle	Crazy Times	Hard rock		
September 30	Shygirl	Nymph	Pop	Because Music	
September 30	Slipknot	The End, So Far	Nu metal, alternative metal, groove metal	Roadrunner	
September 30	Snarky Puppy	Empire Central		GroundUPmusic	
September 30	The Snuts	Burn the Empire	Indie rock	Parlophone	
September 30	Sonata Arctica	Acoustic Adventures – Volume Two	Acoustic	Atomic Fire Records	
September 30	Tankard	Pavlov's Dawgs		Reaper Entertainment	
September 30	Titus Andronicus	The Will to Live		Merge	
September 30	Tory Lanez	Sorry 4 What	Hip-hop, R&B	One Umbrella	
September 30	Tyler Childers and the Food Stamps	Can I Take My Hounds to Heaven?	Country, gospel	Hickman Holler	
September 30	Yeah Yeah Yeahs	Cool It Down		Secretly Canadian	
September 30	YG	I Got Issues		Def Jam	

== Fourth quarter ==
=== October ===
List of albums released in October 2022
Go to: January | February | March | April | May | June | July | August | September | October | November | December | Back to top
Release date	Artist	Album	Genre	Label	Ref.
October 4	Rich Homie Quan	Family & Mula			
October 4	Seulgi	28 Reasons		SM, Dreamus	
October 4	Treasure	The Second Step: Chapter Two	Hip-hop, R&B	YG, YG Plus	
October 5	Jamie	One Bad Night		Warner Music Korea	
October 6	Black Sherif	The Villain I Never Was	Hip-hop, reggae, Afrobeats	Blacko Management, Empire	
October 7	Alvvays	Blue Rev	Shoegaze, indie pop, indie rock	Polyvinyl	
October 7	The Bobby Lees	Bellevue	Garage rock, punk rock	Ipecac	
October 7	Bobby Weir & Wolf Bros	Live in Colorado Vol. 2	Rock, Americana	Third Man	
October 7	Bonny Light Horseman	Rolling Golden Holy		37d03d Records	
October 7	Broken Bells	Into the Blue	Indie rock, trip hop	AWAL	
October 7	Bush	The Art of Survival	Post-grunge	BMG	
October 7	Cantus	Into the Light		Signum	
October 7	Charlie Puth	Charlie	Pop	Atlantic	
October 7	Chloe Moriondo	Suckerpunch		Public Consumption Record Co., Fueled by Ramen	
October 7	Counterparts	A Eulogy for Those Still Here		Pure Noise	
October 7	Courtney Marie Andrews	Loose Future	Americana, folk, indie pop	Fat Possum	
October 7	The Cult	Under the Midnight Sun	Hard rock, gothic rock	Black Hill Records	
October 7	Daphni	Cherry	Electronic	Jiaolong	
October 7	Darren Hayes	Homosexual		Powdered Sugar Productions	
October 7	Dayglow	People in Motion		Very Nice Records, AWAL	
October 7	Dungen	En Är för Mycket och Tusen Aldrig Nog		Mexican Summer	
October 7	Easy Life	Maybe in Another Life...		Island	
October 7	Flohio	Out of Heart		AWAL	
October 7	G Herbo	Survivor's Remorse: Side A			
October 7	Gilla Band	Most Normal	Noise rock, post-punk	Rough Trade	
October 7	Goatwhore	Angels Hung from Arches of Heaven	Blackened thrash, death metal	Metal Blade	
October 7	Indigo Sparke	Hysteria		Sacred Bones	
October 7	Jean Dawson	Chaos Now	Grunge, pop-punk, hip-hop	P+	
October 7	Johanna Warren	Lessons for Mutants		Carpark, Wax Nine Records	
October 7	Kid Bookie	Mass Hysteria		Marshall	
October 7	King Gizzard & the Lizard Wizard	Ice, Death, Planets, Lungs, Mushrooms and Lava	Jazz fusion, psychedelic rock, jazz-funk	KGLW	
October 7	Lamb of God	Omens	Groove metal	Epic, Nuclear Blast	
October 7	Lindsey Stirling	Snow Waltz		Concord	
October 7	Loraine James	Building Something Beautiful for Me	Electronic	Phantom Limb	
October 7	Nnamdï	Please Have a Seat		Secretly Canadian	
October 7	Open Mike Eagle	Component System with the Auto Reverse	Hip-hop	Auto Reverse Records	
October 7	Ozuna	Ozutochi			
October 7	Paul Heaton and Jacqui Abbott	N.K-Pop	Pub rock	EMI	
October 7	Quavo and Takeoff	Only Built for Infinity Links	Trap	Quality Control, Capitol, Motown	
October 7	Queensrÿche	Digital Noise Alliance	Heavy metal, progressive metal	Century Media	
October 7	Ruth Radelet	The Other Side			
October 7	Shabason & Krgovich	At Scaramouche		Idée Fixe	
October 7	Sorry	Anywhere but Here	Indie rock	Domino	
October 7	Stray Kids	Maxident	Pop, hip-hop, R&B	JYP, Republic	
October 7	Sumac	Into This Juvenile Apocalypse Our Golden Blood to Pour Let Us Never	Free improvisation, avant-garde metal	Thrill Jockey	
October 7	Vukovi	Nula		LAB	
October 7	Wednesday 13	Horrifier		Napalm	
October 7	Will Sheff	Nothing Special		ATO	
October 7	Willow	Coping Mechanism	Pop-punk, emo, grunge	MSFTS Music, Polydor, Roc Nation	
October 7	The World Is a Beautiful Place & I Am No Longer Afraid to Die	Thank You for Being Here		Epitaph	
October 7	YoungBoy Never Broke Again	3800 Degrees	Trap, gangsta rap	Never Broke Again, Atlantic	
October 8	Blaster	My Kosmik Island Disk		Island, UMG Philippines	
October 10	G Herbo	Survivor's Remorse: Side B			
October 10	Say Sue Me	10		Damnably, Beach Town Music	
October 11	Dreamcatcher	Apocalypse: Follow Us	K-pop, industrial rock, nu metal	Dreamcatcher Company	
October 11	Mamamoo	Mic On		RBW	
October 12	Karin Miyamoto	Hitori Toiro		Up-Front Works	
October 12	King Gizzard & the Lizard Wizard	Laminated Denim	Psychedelic rock, progressive rock, krautrock	KGLW	
October 12	Kwon Eun-bi	Lethality	K-pop	Woollim	
October 12	Muna	Live at Electric Lady		Saddest Factory	
October 12	Park Ji-hoon	The Answer		Maroo	
October 12	PUP	PUP Unravels Live in Front of Everyone They Know			
October 12	Up10tion	Code Name: Arrow		TOP Media	
October 13	James Reid	Lovescene:		Careless	
October 13	John Carpenter, Cody Carpeenter, and Daniel Davies	Halloween Ends (Original Motion Picture Soundtrack)	Electronic	Sacred Bones	
October 13	Kep1er	Troubleshooter	K-pop	Wake One, Swing	
October 14	The 1975	Being Funny in a Foreign Language	Indie folk, synth-pop, pop rock	Dirty Hit	
October 14	Alter Bridge	Pawns & Kings	Alternative metal, hard rock, progressive metal	Napalm	
October 14	Ashe	Rae		Mom + Pop	
October 14	Backstreet Boys	A Very Backstreet Christmas	Christmas, pop	K-BAHN, RCA BMG	
October 14	Betty Boo	Boomerang		Betty Boo	
October 14	Betty Who	Big!	Dance-pop	BMG	
October 14	Big Big Train	Summer Shall Not Fade – Live at Loreley		English Electric Recordings	
October 14	The Big Moon	Here Is Everything		Fiction	
October 14	Bill Callahan	Ytilaer		Drag City	
October 14	Birds in Row	Gris Klein		Red Creek Recordings	
October 14	Brian Eno	ForeverAndEverNoMore		Verve, UMG	
October 14	Can	Live in Cuxhaven 1976		Mute, Spoon	
October 14	Chris Isaak	Everybody Knows It's Christmas		Sun, Virgin	
October 14	Enumclaw	Save the Baby		Luminelle Recordings	
October 14	Fazerdaze	Break!		section1	
October 14	Field Medic	Grow Your Hair Long If You're Wanting to See Something That You Can Change		Run for Cover	
October 14	Florence and the Machine	Dance Fever (Live at Madison Square Garden)		Polydor	
October 14	Lil Baby	It's Only Me	Hip-hop, trap	Wolfpack, Quality Control, Motown	
October 14	Lolo Zouaï	Playgirl		Keep It On The Lolo, RCA	
October 14	Lorna Shore	Pain Remains	Deathcore	Century Media	
October 14	Louis Cole	Quality Over Opinion		Brainfeeder	
October 14	Lucrecia Dalt	¡Ay!	Bolero, jazz, electronic		
October 14	Mavi	Laughing So Hard It Hurts			
October 14	M.I.A.	Mata	Electronic, hip-hop, worldbeat	Island	
October 14	Mykki Blanco	Stay Close to Music		Transgressive	
October 14	Nessa Barrett	Young Forever	Alternative pop, pop rock	Warner	
October 14	Noah Kahan	Stick Season	Folk	Republic	
October 14	Nothing More	Spirits	Alternative metal, alternative rock	Better Noise Records	
October 14	Ocean Alley	Low Altitude Living			
October 14	Orianthi	Rock Candy		Frontiers	
October 14	Palm	Nicks and Grazes		Saddle Creek	
October 14	Plains (Waxahatchee and Jess Williamson)	I Walked with You a Ways	Country pop	Anti-	
October 14	Poppy	Stagger		Republic	
October 14	Poster Paints (Carla J. Easton and Simon Liddell)	Poster Paints		Ernest Jenning, Olive Grove	
October 14	Red Hot Chili Peppers	Return of the Dream Canteen	Funk rock	Warner	
October 14	Rival Consoles	Now Is		Erased Tapes	
October 14	Skid Row	The Gang's All Here	Heavy metal, glam metal	earMUSIC	
October 14	Skullcrusher	Quiet the Room		Secretly Canadian	
October 14	Sleeping with Sirens	Complete Collapse	Post-hardcore	Sumerian	
October 14	Sparta	Sparta		Dine Alone	
October 14	Tindersticks	Stars at Noon (Original Soundtrack)		City Slang	
October 14	Todd Rundgren	Space Force		Cleopatra	
October 14	Tove Lo	Dirt Femme	Dance-pop	Pretty Swede Records, mtheory	
October 14	The Unthanks	Sorrows Away	Folk	Rabble Rousers	
October 14	Varials	Scars for You to Remember	Nu metalcore, hardcore punk	Fearless	
October 14	We Came as Romans	Darkbloom	Metalcore, post-hardcore	SharpTone	
October 14	Wild Pink	ILYSM	Indie rock	Royal Mountain	
October 14	Zella Day	Sunday in Heaven		Concord	
October 17	Def.	Abandoned Love.	R&B	CDNZA Records	
October 17	(G)I-dle	I Love		Cube	
October 17	Le Sserafim	Antifragile		Hybe, Source Music	
October 19	WEi	Love Pt. 2: Passion		Oui	
October 20	Circuit Des Yeux and Claire Rousay	Sunset Poem		Matador	
October 21	A-ha	True North	RCA, Sony Music	Sony Music	
October 21	Andrea Bocelli, Matteo Bocelli, Virginia Bocelli	A Family Christmas	Christmas	Decca, Capitol	
October 21	Anthony Callea	Forty Love	Pop	Vox Enterprises	
October 21	Archers of Loaf	Reason in Decline	Indie rock	Merge	
October 21	Architects	The Classic Symptoms of a Broken Spirit	Metalcore, industrial metal, pop metal	Epitaph	
October 21	Arctic Monkeys	The Car	Orchestral rock, lounge pop, funk	Domino	
October 21	Avantasia	A Paranormal Evening with the Moonflower Society	Power metal, progressive metal	Nuclear Blast	
October 21	Avatarium	Death, Where Is Your Sting		AFM	
October 21	Babyface	Girls Night Out	R&B	Capitol	
October 21	bbno$	Bag or Die			
October 21	Bibio	Bib10	Electronic, indie folk, funk	Warp	
October 21	Black Veil Brides	The Mourning		Sumerian	
October 21	Brutus	Unison Life		Hassle	
October 21	Carly Rae Jepsen	The Loneliest Time	Synth-pop	604, Schoolboy, Interscope	
October 21	Dawn Richard and Spencer Zahn	Pigments	Avant-garde	Merge	
October 21	Debbie Gibson	Winterlicious	Pop, Christmas	StarGirl	
October 21	Dry Cleaning	Stumpwork		4AD	
October 21	Duckwrth	Chrome Bull			
October 21	Exhumed	To the Dead		Relapse	
October 21	Frankie Cosmos	Inner World Peace	Indie pop	Sub Pop	
October 21	Fredo Bang	UNLV			
October 21	Hildur Guðnadóttir, Cate Blanchett, & Sophie Kauer	Tár (Music from and Inspired by the Motion Picture)	Classical	Deutsche Grammophon	
October 21	Hugh Cornwell	Moments of Madness	Rock	His Records	
October 21	iLe	Nacarile		Sony Music Latin	
October 21	In This Moment	Blood 1983	Synthwave, industrial	BMG	
October 21	Jean-Michel Jarre	Oxymore	Dance, EDM, ambient	Sony Music	
October 21	Jeezy	Snofall			
October 21	Lowertown	I Love to Lie		Dirty Hit	
October 21	Loyle Carner	Hugo		AMF Records, Caroline, Virgin EMI	
October 21	Meghan Trainor	Takin' It Back	Doo-wop, bubblegum pop	Epic	
October 21	My Morning Jacket	MMJ Live Vol. 2: Chicago 2021			
October 21	Nick Hakim	Cometa		ATO	
October 21	Nikki Yanofsky	Nikki by Starlight	Jazz	MNRK Music	
October 21	Oxbow & Peter Brötzmann	An Eternal Reminder of Not Today / Live at Moers		Trost, Hydra Head	
October 21	Pinkshift	Love Me Forever		Hopeless	
October 21	Robyn Hitchcock	Shufflemania!	Power pop	Tiny Ghost Records	
October 21	Rubblebucket	Earth Worship		Grand Jury Music	
October 21	Serj Tankian	Perplex Cities		Serjical Strike	
October 21	Seven Lions	Beyond the Veil			
October 21	Simple Minds	Direction of the Heart		BMG	
October 21	Sloan	Steady		Murderecords, Yep Roc	
October 21	The Soft Pink Truth	Is It Going to Get Any Deeper Than This?		Thrill Jockey	
October 21	Stryper	The Final Battle		Frontiers	
October 21	Taylor Swift	Midnights	Electronic pop, synth-pop, indie pop	Republic	
October 21	Tegan and Sara	Crybaby		Mom+Pop	
October 21	A Wake in Providence	Eternity	Deathcore	Unique Leader Records	
October 21	Whitmer Thomas	The Older I Get the Funnier I Was		Hardly Art	
October 21	Wiki and Subjxct 5	Cold Cuts		Wikset Enterprise	
October 21	YoungBoy Never Broke Again	Ma' I Got a Family		Never Broke Again, Atlantic	
October 24	Galahad	The Last Great Adventurer			
October 24	Kihyun	Youth	K-pop	Starship	
October 25	Mdou Moctar	Niger EP Vol. 2			
October 25	Amerado	G.I.N.A		MicBurnerz Music	
October 26	Epex	Prelude of Love Chapter 1. Puppy Love		C9	
October 27	Sly Withers	Overgrown		Dew Process, UMG	
October 28	The Allman Brothers Band	Syria Mosque	Blues rock	Allman Brothers Band Recording Company	
October 28	Aoife Nessa Frances	Protector		Partisan	
October 28	Ásgeir	Time on My Hands		One Little Independent	
October 28	Babehoven	Light Moving Time		Double Double Whammy	
October 28	Benjamin Clementine	And I Have Been		Preserve Artists	
October 28	Blaqbonez	Young Preacher		Chocolate City	
October 28	Brant Bjork	Bougainvillea Suite	Stoner rock, desert rock	Heavy Psych Sounds	
October 28	Cakes da Killa	Svengali	Hip-hop, deep house, ballroom	Young Art Records	
October 28	Chad Taylor Trio	The Reel	Jazz	Astral Spirits	
October 28	Charles Lloyd	Trio: Sacred Thread			
October 28	Dan Mangan	Being Somewhere	Indie folk, indie rock	Arts & Crafts Productions	
October 28	Darkthrone	Astral Fortress		Peaceville	
October 28	Dead Cross	II		Ipecac	
October 28	Dear Nora	Human Futures		Orindal Records	
October 28	Demon Hunter	Exile	Christian metal, alternative metal	Weapons MFG	
October 28	Dorian Concept	What We Do for Others		Brainfeeder	
October 28	dvsn	Working on My Karma		OVO Sound, Warner	
October 28	Dylan	The Greatest Thing I'll Never Learn		Island	
October 28	Fear Factory	Recoded			
October 28	Fire from the Gods	Soul Revolution		Better Noise	
October 28	Fit for a King	The Hell We Create	Melodic metalcore, deathcore	Solid State	
October 28	Fred Again	Actual Life 3 (January 1 – September 9 2022)	Electronic	Atlantic	
October 28	Hermanos Gutiérrez	El Bueno y el Malo	Ambient, instrumental rock	Easy Eye Sound	
October 28	The Hunna	The Hunna		Believe	
October 28	King Gizzard & the Lizard Wizard	Changes	Psychedelic pop, progressive pop, psychedelic soul	KGLW	
October 28	Lainey Wilson	Bell Bottom Country	Country	BBR	
October 28	Lee Fields	Sentimental Fool		Daptone	
October 28	Martha	Please Don't Take Me Back		Dirtnap	
October 28	Montell Fish	Her Love Still Haunts Me Like a Ghost		Virgin	
October 28	Mr Twin Sister	Upright and Even		Twin Group	
October 28	Natalia Lafourcade	De Todas las Flores		Sony Music Mexico	
October 28	Nosaj Thing	Continua	Electronic	LuckyMe	
October 28	Palaye Royale	Fever Dream		Sumerian	
October 28	Pentatonix	Holidays Around the World	Christmas, a cappella	RCA	
October 28	Polyphia	Remember That You Will Die			
October 28	PG Roxette	Pop-Up Dynamo!	Pop	Elevator Entertainment, Parlophone	
October 28	Scout Gillett	No Roof No Floor		Captured Tracks	
October 28	Show Me the Body	Trouble the Water	Hardcore punk	Loma Vista	
October 28	Smino	Luv 4 Rent		Zero Fatigue, Motown	
October 28	Tom Odell	Best Day of My Life		UROK, mtheory	
October 28	Trampled by Turtles	Alpenglow			
October 28	Vera Blue	Mercurial	Indie pop	Island Australia, UMA	
October 28	Westside Gunn	10	Hip-hop	Griselda, Empire	
October 28	Yung Gravy	Marvelous		Republic	
October 31	Backxwash	His Happiness Shall Come First Even Though We Are Suffering	Hip-hop	Ugly Hag	
October 31	Sci-Fi Soldier	Get More Down	Progressive rock	JEMP	

=== November ===
List of albums released in November 2022
Go to: January | February | March | April | May | June | July | August | September | October | November | December | Back to top
Release date	Artist	Album	Genre	Label	Ref.
November 1	Regina Belle	My Colorful Christmas		Tashi3 Entertainment	
November 2	ExWhyZ	XYZ	J-pop	WACK, EMI	
November 3	BGYO	Be Us	Pop	Star Music	
November 3	Wizkid	More Love, Less Ego	Pop, R&B, Afrobeats	Starboy, RCA, Sony Music	
November 4	96 Bitter Beings	Synergy Restored		Nuclear Blast	
November 4	Alicia Keys	Santa Baby	Christmas		
November 4	Anna of the North	Crazy Life		Honeymoon Records	
November 4	Barbra Streisand	Live at the Bon Soir		Columbia	
November 4	Big Joanie	Back Home		Kill Rock Stars	
November 4	Billy Joel	Billy Joel Live at Yankee Stadium		Columbia, Legacy	
November 4	Black Anvil	Regenesis	Black metal	Season of Mist	
November 4	Boldy James	Mr. Ten08			
November 4	Caleb Landry Jones	Gadzooks Vol. 2		Sacred Bones	
November 4	Carla dal Forno	Come Around	Synth-pop, post-punk	Kallista Records	
November 4	Cavetown	Worm Food		Sire	
November 4	Clive Mitten	Transcriptions			
November 4	Connie Constance	Miss Power		PIAS	
November 4	Daniel Avery	Ultra Truth		Phantasy Sounds, Mute	
November 4	Dayseeker	Dark Sun	Post-hardcore, metalcore	Spinefarm	
November 4	Dean Lewis	The Hardest Love		Island	
November 4	Dean Fertita	Tropical Gothclub		Third Man	
November 4	Devin Townsend	Lightwork	Progressive rock	Inside Out	
November 4	Disillusion	Ayam		Prophecy	
November 4	Drake and 21 Savage	Her Loss	Hip-hop	OVO, Republic	
November 4	Ezra Collective	Where I'm Meant to Be	Jazz	Partisan	
November 4	La Femme	Teatro Lúcido	Pasodoble, reggaeton	Disque Pointu	
November 4	First Aid Kit	Palomino		Columbia	
November 4	Fleshwater	We're Not Here to Be Loved		Closed Casket Activities	
November 4	Frank Bello	Then I'm Gone		Rare Bird Books, Experience Vinyl	
November 4	Glen Phillips	There Is So Much Here		Compass	
November 4	Gordon Giltrap	Scattered Chapters		Psychotron Records	
November 4	Gryffin	Alive	Deep house	Darkroom, Geffen	
November 4	Ingested	Ashes Lie Still		Metal Blade	
November 4	Jason Collett	Head Full of Wonder		Arts & Crafts	
November 4	Jes	Memento			
November 4	Joji	Smithereens		88rising, Warner	
November 4	Last Dinosaurs	From Mexico with Love		Nettwerk	
November 4	Laura Jean	Amateurs		Chapter	
November 4	Luke Evans	A Song for You		BMG	
November 4	Magnolia Park	Baku's Revenge		Epitaph	
November 4	The Menzingers	On the Possible Past	Acoustic music	Epitaph	
November 4	MorMor	Semblance			
November 4	Mount Kimbie	MK 3.5: Die Cuts/City Planning		Warp	
November 4	Must Die!	Feral Fantasy			
November 4	Ofenbach	I			
November 4	Okay Kaya	Sap		Jagjaguwar	
November 4	Phoenix	Alpha Zulu	Pop rock, synth-rock	Loyauté, Glassnote	
November 4	PJ Harvey	B-Sides, Demos, & Rarities		UMe, Island	
November 4	The Pretty Reckless	Other Worlds		Fearless	
November 4	R.A.P. Ferreira	5 to the Eye with Stars		Ruby Yacht	
November 4	Rayland Baxter	If I Were a Butterfly		ATO	
November 4	The Reklaws	Good Ol' Days	Country, country pop	Starseed Records	
November 4	Seth Avett	Seth Avett Sings Greg Brown			
November 4	Slowly Slowly	Daisy Chain		UNFD	
November 4	Special Interest	Endure		Rough Trade	
November 4	Spoon	Lucifer on the Moon	Dub	Matador	
November 4	Suki Waterhouse	Milk Teeth		Sub Pop	
November 4	Switchfoot	This Is Our Christmas Album		Lowercase People	
November 4	Tenci	A Swollen River, a Well Overflowing		Keeled Scales	
November 4	Tom Skinner	Voices of Bishara	Jazz	Nonesuch, International Anthem, Brownswood	
November 4	Turnover	Myself in the Way		Run for Cover	
November 4	Vika and Linda	Gee Wizz, It's Christmas		Bloodlines	
November 4	Voivod	Ultraman		Century Media	
November 4	The Welcome Wagon	Esther		Asthmatic Kitty	
November 4	Xentrix	Seven Words	Thrash metal	Listenable	
November 4	Yonatan Gat	American Quartet	Psychedelic rock	Stone Tapes, Joyful Noise	
November 4	Yung Fazo	Me vs Me		Capitol, Universal	
November 10	Brantley Gilbert	So Help Me God		Valory	
November 10	DRAM	What Had Happened Was...		Waver Records	
November 10	Quadeca	I Didn't Mean to Haunt You	Folktronica	DeadAir, AWAL	
November 11	Actress	Dummy Corporation	Electronic	Ninja Tune	
November 11	AleXa	Girls Gone Vogue		ZB Label	
November 11	Bill Nace	Through a Room	Experimental	Drag City	
November 11	The Black Dahlia Murder	Yule 'Em All: A Holiday Variety Extravaganza			
November 11	Black Eyed Peas	Elevation	Hip-hop, electro funk	will.i.am, Epic	
November 11	Bruce Springsteen	Only the Strong Survive	Soul, R&B	Columbia	
November 11	Chelsea Grin	Suffer in Hell	Deathcore	ONErpm	
November 11	Christine and the Queens	Redcar les adorables étoiles (prologue)	Synth-pop	Because	
November 11	Drowse	Wane Into It		The Flenser	
November 11	Drudkh	All Belong to the Night		Season of Mist	
November 11	Enuff Z'Nuff	Finer Than Sin			
November 11	Epica	The Alchemy Project	Symphonic metal	Atomic Fire	
November 11	FaltyDL	A Nurse to My Patience		Blueberry Records	
November 11	Fitz and the Tantrums	Let Yourself Free		Elektra	
November 11	Franz Nicolay	New River		Don Giovanni	
November 11	Girl Named Tom	One More Christmas		Republic	
November 11	GloRilla	Anyways, Life's Great	Hip-hop	Interscope	
November 11	Gold Panda	The Work		City Slang	
November 11	He Is Legend	Endless Hallway		Spinefarm	
November 11	Helena Hauff	Living with Ladybirds		Fabric Originals	
November 11	Homeboy Sandman	Still Champion		Mello Music	
November 11	Hyd	Clearing		PC Music	
November 11	Jimmy Edgar	Liquids Heaven			
November 11	Jordana	I'm Doing Well, Thanks for Asking		Grand Jury	
November 11	Kampfar	Til Klovers Takt		Indie Recordings	
November 11	L.S. Dunes	Past Lives	Post-hardcore, emo	Fantasy	
November 11	Larkin Poe	Blood Harmony		Tricki-Woo Records	
November 11	Last in Line	A Day in the Life		earMUSIC	
November 11	Louis Tomlinson	Faith in the Future	Indie rock	BMG	
November 11	Lous and the Yakuza	Iota		Columbia	
November 11	MGMT	11•11•11			
November 11	Monster Magnet	Test Patterns: Vol. 1			
November 11	Nas	King's Disease III	East Coast hip-hop	Mass Appeal	
November 11	Paul Maroon & Jenny Lin	13 Short Piano Pieces			
November 11	Plaid	Feorm Falorx		Warp	
November 11	Rauw Alejandro	Saturno		Sony Music Latin, Duars Entertainment	
November 11	Run the Jewels	RTJ Cu4tro		Jewel Runners, BMG	
November 11	Sarathy Korwar	Kalak	Jazz	The Leaf Label	
November 11	Sarkodie	Jamz	Hip-hop, highlife	Sarkcess Music, MusicZiiki Media	
November 11	Sault	11	Funk, neo soul	Forever Living Originals	
November 11	Sault	Aiir	Contemporary classical	Forever Living Originals	
November 11	Sault	Earth	Funk	Forever Living Originals	
November 11	Sault	Today & Tomorrow	Funk, punk rock	Forever Living Originals	
November 11	Sault	Untitled (God)	Funk, gospel, Christian	Forever Living Originals	
November 11	SoFaygo	Pink Heartz	Hip-hop	Cactus Jack	
November 11	Thundamentals	All This Life		High Depth	
November 11	Winston Surfshirt	Panna Cotta		Sweat It Out, BMG	
November 11	Yuna	Y5		Yuna Room Records, Independent Co.	
November 14	Jelena Rozga	Minut Srca Mog	Pop, folk	Croatia, Tonika	
November 15	The Smashing Pumpkins	Atum: Act One		Martha's Music, Thirty Tigers	
November 16	Lisa	Lander		Sacra Music	
November 17	Brockhampton	The Family		Question Everything, RCA	
November 17	Bronze Avery	Softmetal			
November 17	Fousheé	Softcore	Alternative rock, hyperpop, R&B	RCA	
November 17	Key Glock	PRE5L			
November 18	38 Spesh & Harry Fraud	Beyond Belief			
November 18	Adrian Quesada	Jaguar Sound	Psychedelic soul, hip-hop		
November 18	Amos Lee	My Ideal: A Tribute to Chet Baker Sings	Vocal jazz	Blue Note	
November 18	Animal Collective	The Inspection (Original Motion Picture Soundtrack)			
November 18	Badge Époque Ensemble & Lammping	Clouds of Joy: Chance of Reign			
November 18	B.I	Love or Loved Part.1	Pop, EDM, R&B	131 Label	
November 18	Billy Strings	Me and Dad		Rounder	
November 18	Brockhampton	TM			
November 18	Busta Rhymes	The Fuse Is Lit		Conglomerate, Empire	
November 18	Candlemass	Sweet Evil Sun	Doom metal	Napalm	
November 18	Caitlin Rose	Cazimi	Country	Missing Piece Records, Names Records	
November 18	Colin Stetson	The Menu (Original Motion Picture Soundtrack)		Milan	
November 18	Daniel Bachman	Almanac Behind		Three Lobed Recordings	
November 18	Dermot Kennedy	Sonder	Pop	Riggins Recording, Interscope, Island	
November 18	Dezron Douglas	Atalaya	Jazz		
November 18	Disturbed	Divisive	Heavy metal, alternative metal, hard rock	Reprise	
November 18	DJ Yoda	Prom Nite	Club		
November 18	Gatherers	Mutilator		No Sleep	
November 18	Granger Smith	Moonrise			
November 18	Honey Dijon	Black Girl Magic		Classic Music Company	
November 18	Jimi Hendrix Experience	Los Angeles Forum: April 26, 1969	Rock	Experience Hendrix, Legacy	
November 18	Jim Keltner, Mike Watt, & Mike Baggetta	Everywhen We Go		Big Ego Records	
November 18	Kaash Paige	S2ML (Soundtrack 2 My Life)		Def Jam, Universal Music	
November 18	Loreena McKennitt	Under a Winter's Moon		Quinlan Road	
November 18	Neil Young and Crazy Horse	World Record	Folk rock	Reprise	
November 18	Nickelback	Get Rollin'		BMG	
November 18	Phony Ppl	Euphonyus		300	
November 18	The Real McKenzies	Songs of the Highlands, Songs of the Sea		Fat Wreck Chords, Stomp Records	
November 18	Richard Dawson	The Ruby Cord	Progressive folk	Domino, Weird World	
November 18	Roddy Ricch	Feed Tha Streets III		Atlantic, Bird Vision Entertainment	
November 18	Röyksopp	Profound Mysteries III		Dog Triumph	
November 18	Ruthie Foster	Healing Time		Blue Corn	
November 18	Saint Asonia	Extrovert		Spinefarm	
November 18	Saweetie	The Single Life		Icy Records, Warner	
November 18	Senidah	Za Tebe	Alternative pop, hip-hop, alternative R&B	Bassivity Digital	
November 18	Sneaks	The Eva EP		Merge	
November 18	Soulside	A Brief Moment in the Sun		Dischord	
November 18	The Stone Foxes	On the Other Side			
November 18	Tallah	The Generation of Danger		Earache	
November 18	Thaiboy Digital	Back 2 Life		Year0001	
November 18	Threshold	Dividing Lines	Pop, jazz, Christmas	Nuclear Blast	
November 18	Various artists	Spirited (Soundtrack from the Apple Original Film)		Republic	
November 18	Veps	Oslo Park		Kanine	
November 18	Weyes Blood	And in the Darkness, Hearts Aglow	Chamber pop, indie pop, folk rock	Sub Pop	
November 18	Willie Nelson	Willie Nelson Live at Budokan		Legacy	
November 18	The Wombats	Is This What It Feels Like to Feel Like This?			
November 18	Yoasobi	E-Side 2	J-pop	Sony Music Japan	
November 23	Danny Elfman, Chris Bacon	Wednesday (Original Series Soundtrack)		Lakeshore	
November 24	Horse Lords	Comradely Objects		RVNG Intl.	
November 25	Andy Bell	Untitled Film Stills EP			
November 25	Cliff Richard	Christmas with Cliff		East West	
November 25	David Bowie	Divine Symmetry		Parlophone	
November 25	The Doors	Paris Blues			
November 25	Elder	Innate Passage	Psychedelic rock, progressive rock	Stickman Records	
November 25	Elvis Costello and the Imposters	The Boy Named If (Alive at Memphis Magnetic)			
November 25	Jamie Lenman	The Atheist		Big Scary Monsters	
November 25	Jimmy Barnes	Blue Christmas		Bloodlines	
November 25	Leather Leone	We Are the Chosen		Steamhammer/SPV	
November 25	Marcel Dettmann	Fear of Programming		Dekmantel Records	
November 25	Mauro Remiddi	Moonbird			
November 25	Mylène Farmer	L'Emprise	Pop, electropop	Stuffed Monkey	
November 25	Nathan Johnson	Glass Onion: A Knives Out Mystery (Soundtrack from the Netflix Film)		Netflix Music	
November 25	The Smith Street Band	Life After Football		Pool House Records	
November 25	Sophie Ellis-Bextor	Kitchen Disco – Live at the London Palladium		Cooking Vinyl	
November 25	Stormzy	This Is What I Mean	British hip-hop, contemporary R&B, soul	0207 Def Jam	
November 25	Waajeed	Memoirs of Hi-Tech Jazz		Tresor	
November 28	Necrodeath	Singin' in the Pain		Time to Kill Records	
November 28	Red Velvet	The ReVe Festival 2022 – Birthday		SM	
November 30	Itzy	Cheshire		JYP, Republic	
November 30	Ryuichi Sakamoto and various artists	A Tribute to Ryuichi Sakamoto – To the Moon and Back		Milan	

=== December ===
List of albums released in December 2022
Go to: January | February | March | April | May | June | July | August | September | October | November | December | Back to top
Release date	Artist	Album	Genre	Label	Ref.
December 1	Feid	Sixdo			
December 2	100 gecs	Snake Eyes	Hyperpop, experimental, electronic	Dog Show, Atlantic	
December 2	Adalita	Inland		Liberation	
December 2	Amberian Dawn	Take a Chance – A Metal Tribute to ABBA	Power metal, symphonic metal	Napalm	
December 2	Babyface Ray	Mob		Wavy Gang, Empire	
December 2	Black Ox Orkestar	Everything Returns			
December 2	Boris	Fade	Drone metal	Fangs Anal Satan	
December 2	Brakence	Hypochondriac		Columbia, Sony	
December 2	Brendan Benson	Low Key			
December 2	Deströyer 666	Never Surrender		Season of Mist	
December 2	Half Alive	Conditions of a Punk		RCA	
December 2	Hammers of Misfortune	Overtaker			
December 2	Kadhja Bonet	California Holiday		Ninja Tune	
December 2	Metro Boomin	Heroes & Villains		Republic, Boominati	
December 2	NOFX	Double Album	Punk rock	Fat Wreck Chords	
December 2	Other Half	Soft Action	Post-hardcore	Big Scary Monsters	
December 2	RM	Indigo		Big Hit Music	
December 2	Snotty Nose Rez Kids	I'm Good, HBU?			
December 2	Villano Antillano	La sustancia X		Sony Music Latin	
December 2	White Lung	Premonition		Domino	
December 8	Bree Runway	Woah, What a Blur!			
December 8	María Becerra	La Nena de Argentina			
December 9	A Boogie wit da Hoodie	Me vs. Myself		Highbridge, Atlantic	
December 9	Crosses	Permanent Radiant		Warner	
December 9	David Crosby & the Lighthouse Band	David Crosby & The Lighthouse Band Live at the Capitol Theatre			
December 9	Mount Westmore	Snoop Cube 40 $hort	West Coast hip-hop, gangsta rap, trap	MNRK Music	
December 9	Nina Hagen	Unity		Grönland	
December 9	Sam Fender	Live from Finsbury Park		Polydor	
December 9	Sam Ryder	There's Nothing but Space, Man!	Pop, pop rock	Parlophone	
December 9	Seun Kuti and Black Thought	African Dreams			
December 9	SZA	SOS	R&B, hip-hop, pop	Top Dawg, RCA	
December 12	Little Simz	No Thank You	Hip-hop, gospel, electronic	101 Music, AWAL	
December 14	For Tracy Hyde	Hotel Insomnia	Shoegaze	P-Vine	
December 14	‌INI	Awakening	‌‌	Lapone	
December 14	Madlib and Mark Ronson	The Album		Recycled Records	
December 14	Nemophila	Seize the Fate		Master Works	
December 14	The Smile	The Smile (Live at Montreux Jazz Festival, July 2022)		XL	
December 16	Ab-Soul	Herbert	West Coast hip-hop	TDE	
December 16	Jacquees	Sincerely for You			
December 16	PinkPantheress	Take Me Home		Warner	
December 16	Young Dolph	Paper Route Frank			
December 21	Mike	Beware of the Monkey	Hip-hop	10K	
December 21	Weezer	SZNZ: Winter	Pop rock, grunge, emo	Atlantic	
December 23	YoungBoy Never Broke Again	Lost Files		Never Broke Again, Atlantic	
December 24	Sugababes	The Lost Tapes	Dance-pop, soul, R&B		
December 25	DC the Don	Sacred Heart			
December 25	Zach Bryan	All My Homies Hate Ticketmaster (Live from Red Rocks)	Country	Belting Bronco Records, Warner	
