= Soft Action =

Studio album by Other Half
- Released: December 2, 2022
- Recorded: 2022
- Studio: Sickroom Studios, Norfolk, England, United Kingdom
- Genre: Post-hardcore
- Length: 41:38
- Language: English
- Label: Big Scary Monsters Recording Company
- Producer: Owen Turner

Other Half chronology
Big Twenty (2020)	Soft Action (2022)

Soft Action is the second full-length album by British punk rock group Other Half. It has received positive reviews from critics.

== Reception ==
Professional ratings
Review scores
Source	Rating
Kerrang!	4/5 stars
The Line of Best Fit	7/10

Writing for Kerrang!, Nick Ruskell calls this music "absolutely fantastic" and writes "Raging, melodic, angular, clever, immediate, furious and joyous, Other Half are a fantastic band"; he scored this release 4 out of 5 stars. At The Line of Best Fit, Adam Wright rated this album a 7 out of 10, calling it a "more carefully crafted sound looks further afield for its inspiration" than their previous release Big Twenty, and praises Cal Hudson's lyrics and Sophie Porter's musicianship in particular. Editors at Stereogum chose this for Album of the Week, with critic Chris Deville stating that the music "is far too visceral and immediate to exist exclusively as an object of retro fascination" with the band's experimentation with post-hardcore conventions and the album "show[s] off some versatility within the relentless barrage".

== Track listing ==
1. "Like a Dog" – 0:39
2. "Jollies with the Boys" – 3:05
3. "Slab Thick" – 2:57
4. "In My Wires" – 3:09
5. "Grisly Visions" – 3:00
6. "Just a Holiday" – 2:57
7. "Losing the Whip" – 2:48
8. "All Bets Are Off" – 2:53
9. "Doom Logo" – 1:08
10. "Who's Got Guts?" – 3:50
11. "Every Future" – 3:48
12. "Planetary Feeling" – 3:07
13. "Ugly Reunion" – 3:09
14. "If You Write the Way You Talk" – 5:07

== Personnel ==
Other Half

- Alfie Adams – drums, artwork
- Cal Hudson – guitar, vocals, artwork
- Sophie Porter – bass guitar, vocals, artwork

Other personnel

- Owen Turner – keyboards, recording, mixing, mastering

== See also ==
- Lists of 2022 albums
