= Taylor Alxndr =

Music artist, drag queen, activist

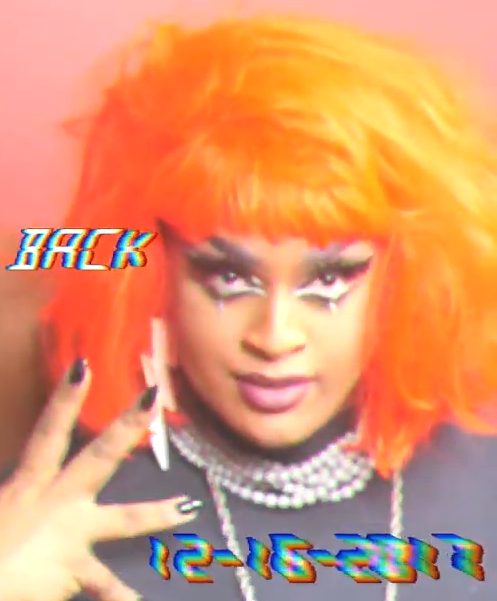
- Born: February 13, 1993 (age 33)
- Education: Georgia State University
- Notable work: "Say What You Mean" music video
- Website: tayloralxndr.com

The subject of this biography uses, and should be referred to with, the pronouns they/she (source); for the sake of consistency this article uses they/them. Please do not change these pronouns without a consensus on the talk page. For more information, see Wikipedia:Manual of Style/Biography § Gender identity.

Taylor Alxndr is a social activist, community organizer, entertainer, and drag queen based in Atlanta, Georgia. They are the founder of the United States LGBTQ non-profit Southern Fried Queer Pride.

== Community work ==
Alxndr has spoken out in support of "voices who have been marginalized and erased" and black queer and trans people in the South.

Alxndr has also planned community events, including a "Paris Is Burning" ball in 2018.

=== Southern Fried Queer Pride ===
Alxndr co-founded Southern Fried Queer Pride (SFQP) in 2014, which they say is a "queer and trans, arts and community organization and festival based here in Atlanta, with roots all over the south." Through their work with Southern Fried Queer Pride, Alxndr focuses their work on with black and brown trans youth.

In 2020, a GoFundMe for Southern Fried Queer Pride raised over $130,000 to create a community space for the organization. The community center's working name is The Clutch Community Center, in memory of MonteQarlo, who was one of the founders of Southern Fried Queer Pride. MonteQarlo drowned in 2018 at Tybee Island, Georgia.

Southern Fried Queer Pride spent four years searching for a suitable property for the community center and signed a lease for a building in December 2023. They spent $21,000 on permits and architectural work to get the building suitable for use. In September 2024 SFQP shared on social media that they had broken this lease due to ongoing issues with the landlord.

== Art ==
Alxndr as a music artist has released songs and music videos including "Nightwork" (2017), their debut album "Hologram" in 2019, and "Say What You Mean" (2020); their music includes social justice messages about Black Lives Matter and the trans rights movement. Their music videos are inspired by 2000s culture and filmmakers like John Hughes.

Alxndr is a drag queen, and they are the house mother of "House of Alxndr". In 2019, Alxndr was voted 'Atlanta's Best Drag Queen & Best LGBTQ Performer'.

== Personal life ==
Alxndr uses they/she pronouns and identifies as queer and non-binary. Alxndr was named one of the 100 most influential LGBTQ+ Georgians in 2020.
