= James and the Shame =

Stage name of Rhett James McLaughlin

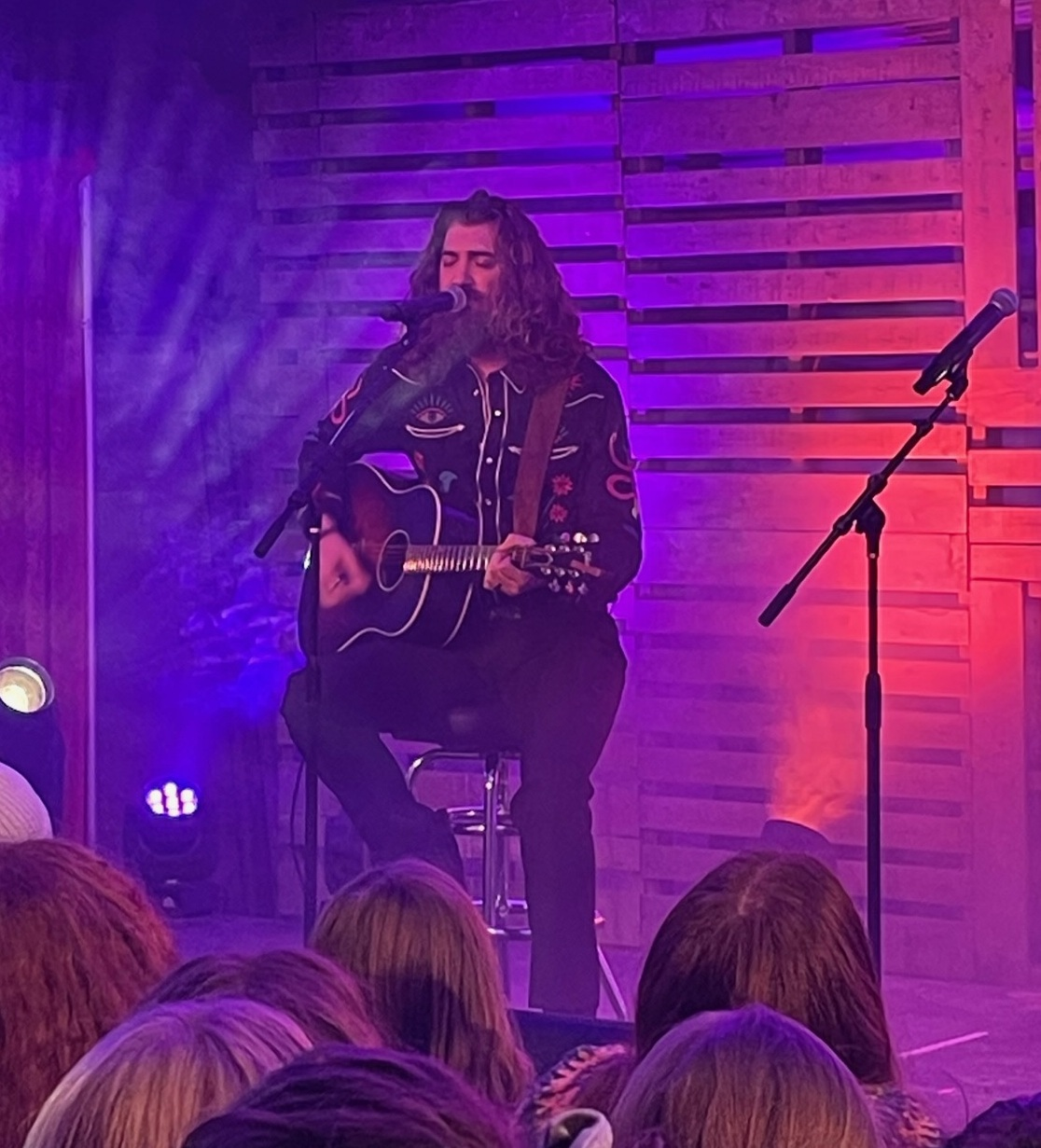
- James and the Shame at Mythicon 2022

Background information
- Born: Rhett James McLaughlin; October 11, 1977 (age 49); Macon, Georgia, U.S.
- Genres: Country; Americana
- Instruments: Vocals, guitar
- Years active: 2022–present
- Member of: Rhett & Link
- Website: jamesandtheshame.com

James and the Shame is the stage name used by American musician and entertainer Rhett James McLaughlin of the comedy duo Rhett & Link for his solo music projects. McLaughlin's first album under the name was released in September 2022 and was titled Human Overboard. The album discussed his departure from and criticisms of Christian evangelicalism. A follow-up EP, titled Nothing Left to Love, was released on November 3, 2023.

== History ==
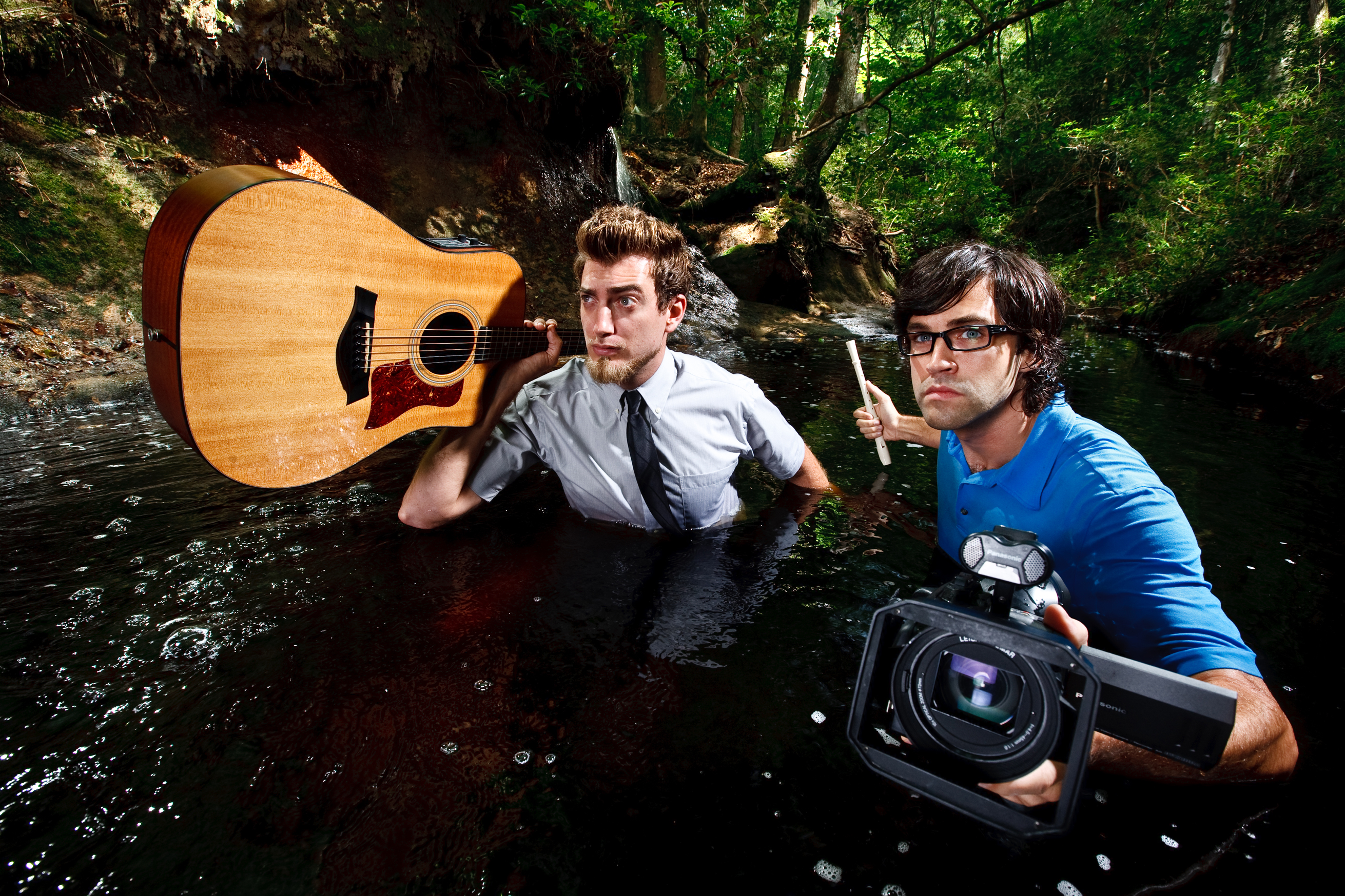
Rhett (left) and Link (right) posing for their "Up to This Point" album cover

Rhett James McLaughlin is known for his work with comedy partner Link Neal. Together they host Good Mythical Morning, a daily comedy, talk and variety show on YouTube. They have also recorded three comedy music albums together, and written numerous comedy songs. Rhett & Link independently released Just Mail Us the Grammy in 2001, and I'm Sorry, What Was That? (Live in the Living Room) in 2005. In 2009, they released an album titled Up To This Point through DFTBA Records.

McLaughlin and Neal were both raised as Christians and previously worked as full-time missionaries while attending college. In 2020, both men described their changes in faith in separate episodes of their podcast Ear Biscuits. Both said they are no longer evangelical Christians, with McLaughlin saying he would call himself "a hopeful agnostic". McLaughlin later expanded on his faith deconstruction and his criticisms of Christian evangelism, purity culture, and his previous and current self.

In July 2022, McLaughlin released a single titled "Believe Me" under the name "James and the Shame", his first non-comedy and first solo song he had released. At the same time, he announced he would be releasing a full album titled Human Overboard. On August 19, a second single titled "Where We're Going" was released, with the music video being released a day earlier. The song is a duet with his wife Jessie. The final single released was "Give a Damn", which also included an animated music video by Micah Buzan. The full album was released on September 23, 2022. The album was recorded at Finn-land Studios in Burbank, California with Derek Furhmann producing. The album is a country music album, with McLaughlin citing Jason Isbell, Tyler Childers and Sturgill Simpson as sources of inspiration.

McLaughlin performed live at his and Neal's 2022 fan convention, Mythicon.

In September 2023, McLaughlin announced on the Ear Biscuits podcast that he would be releasing an EP in November of the same year. The EP, titled Nothing Left to Love, was released on November 3, 2023.

On November 6th, 2026, McLaughlin released his first single not specifically intended for an album, titled "Orion", after deciding he would be start working with a "release as I go" approach in 2024.

== Discography ==
=== Studio Albums ===
- Human Overboard (2022)

=== EPs ===
- Nothing Left to Love (2023)

=== Singles ===
- "Believe Me" (2022)
- "Where We're Going" (2022)
- "Give a Damn" (2022)
- "Nothing Left to Love" (2023)
- "The One I Love to Find" (2023)
- "I Think I'm Supposed to Like This" (2023)
- "Orion" (2026)

== Human Overboard ==
Human Overboard

Studio album by James and the Shame
- Released: September 23, 2022
- Studio: Finn-land Studios
- Genre: Country
- Length: 40:46
- Label: Recondite But Cordial Records
- Producer: Derek Fuhrmann

All tracks are written by Rhett James McLaughlin, except where noted.

No.	Title	Length
1.	"Believe Me"	4:07
2.	"Flash of Rationality"	2:54
3.	"Give a Damn"	3:26
4.	"Sorry"	3:51
5.	"Where We're Going"	4:05
6.	"Creek and Back"	3:51
7.	"Only Thing"	3:35
8.	"Kill a Man"	3:51
9.	"In Vain"	3:41
10.	"Fruit"	4:30
11.	"Old Letters"	3:15
Total length:		41:06

=== Personnel ===
- Rhett James McLaughlin – vocals, acoustic guitar
- Gunnar Olsen – drums, percussion
- Alex Strahle – acoustic guitar, electric guitar, pedal steel guitar, slide guitar, mandolin
- Derek Fuhrmann – bass, percussion, background vocals
- Jessie McLaughlin – additional vocals (tracks 5, 6, and 7)
- Carey Frank – organ
- Edan Dover – piano
- Dave Eggar – cello
- Chris Bautista – trumpet

The album was produced by McLaughlin and Fuhrmann and mixed by Fuhrmann. It was mastered by Jamie King. The strings were recorded by Timothy James King Jr. and the organ was recorded by Tally Sherwood at Tritone Recordings. The cover art was made by Greg Newbold based on photos by Anna Webber.
