= In/Out/In =

Compilation album by Sonic Youth
- Released: March 18, 2022
- Recorded: 2000–2010
- Length: 44:45
- Label: Three Lobed Recordings

Sonic Youth chronology
Smart Bar Chicago 1985 (2012)	In/Out/In (2022)

Professional ratings
Review scores
Source	Rating
The A.V. Club	B−
AllMusic	4/5 stars
The Guardian	2/5 stars
Pitchfork	8.0/10
Rolling Stone	4/5 stars

In/Out/In is a 2022 compilation album by Sonic Youth, released on Three Lobed Recordings. Its five tracks were recorded between 2000 and 2010.

== History ==
"In & Out" and "Out & In" were first released as part of the Not The Spaces You Know, But Between Them various artists box-set. "Basement Contender" was first released as part of the sonicyouth.com Mix-Tape #7 download, and later included on Rarities 3. "Machine" was first released as a bonus mp3 download as part of Matador's "Buy Early Get Now" promotion for The Eternal, and later included on Rarities 3. "Social Static" was first released as a free mp3 download on sonicyouth.com, and later included on Rarities 3.

== Track listing ==
No.	Title	Length
1.	"Basement Contender"	9:34
2.	"In & Out"	7:35
3.	"Machine"	3:37
4.	"Social Static"	11:41
5.	"Out & In"	12:18

== Charts ==
Chart performance for In/Out/In
Chart (2022)	Peak position
UK Album Downloads (OCC)	29
