= Nick Mono =

- Born: Nick Nannar; 2002 (age 22–23)
- Genres: Alternative Rock; Indie Pop
- Years active: 2019–present
- Labels: Parlophone
- Website: nickmono.com

Nick Nannar (born 2002), professionally known as Nick Mono, is a British singer-songwriter, producer, and multi-instrumentalist from West London, United Kingdom. He has described his musical style as "a wide range of music from hip-hop to alternative rock". Following his independently-released single "Effy Stonem" in 2020, Mono signed with Parlophone.

== Early life ==
Nick was born in London in 2002 and is of Punjabi-Indian heritage. He became interested in music after watching The Jackson 5 perform their song "I Want You Back" on The Ed Sullivan Show, and started playing the guitar at age five. Nick is a self-proclaimed "die-hard fan" of Justin Bieber since childhood, and lists him as his biggest inspiration to this day. At age ten, Nick uploaded two covers to YouTube—one of Bieber's "Boyfriend", and another one of One Direction's "One Thing".

== Discography ==
=== EPs ===
- Censor (2019)
- The Art of Social Distancing (2020)
- The Sun Won't Stay After Summer (2022)

=== Singles ===
- "Effy Stonem" (2020)
- "Rusty" (2021)
- "All That You Do" (2021)
- "Anywhere in the World" (2021)
- "All The Money" (2022)
