= Spencer Gets It Lit =

Studio album by Jon Spencer & the Hitmakers
- Released: April 1, 2022
- Genres: Alternative rock; garage rock
- Labels: Bronzerat; Shove; In the Red
- Producers: Bill Skibbe; Jon Spencer

Jon Spencer chronology
Spencer Sings the Hits (2018)	Spencer Gets It Lit (2022)

Spencer Gets It Lit is a studio album by Jon Spencer & the Hitmakers. It was released on April 1, 2022, via Bronzerat/Shove Records. Production was handled by Bill Skibbe and Jon Spencer at Key Club Recording Company in Benton Harbor, Michigan on July – August 2021.

== Critical reception ==
Professional ratings
Aggregate scores
Source	Rating
Metacritic	76/100
Review scores
Source	Rating
AllMusic	3.5/5 stars
Classic Rock	4/5 stars
Mojo	4/5 stars
Uncut	8/10
Under The Radar	4/10 stars

Spencer Gets It Lit was met with generally favorable reviews from music critics. At Metacritic, which assigns a weighted mean rating out of 100 to reviews from mainstream critics, the album received an average score of 76, based on five reviews, which indicates "generally positive reviews".

Rob Hughes of Classic Rock claimed that the album "feels like the work of a man who's rediscovered his mojo". Andrew Perry of Mojo found the album "hugely entertaining". Erin Osmon of Uncut stated that the album "is the strongest recorded offering from the rocker since the Blues Explosion's 2012 album, Meat + Bone". Mark Deming of AllMusic wrote: "keep your expectations properly adjusted and Spencer Gets It Lit will be an effective soundtrack to all manner of wild good times".

In a mixed review, Anthony Mark Happel of Under the Radar wrote: "it's as if all of these songs are the equivalent of a nutty tossed-off filler track that might close side one of an album as a joke. None of the songs are developed beyond the point of cartoonish posturing and none have much to recommend them musically".

== Track listing ==
All tracks are written by Jon Spencer.

No.	Title	Length
1.	"Junk Man"	2:21
2.	"Get It Right Now"	2:24
3.	"Death Ray"	3:54
4.	"The Worst Facts"	3:08
5.	"Primary Baby"	2:23
6.	"Worm Town"	3:34
7.	"Bruise"	2:26
8.	"Layabout Trap"	2:50
9.	"Push Comes to Shove"	1:58
10.	"My Hit Parade"	2:26
11.	"Rotting Money"	2:44
12.	"Strike 3"	2:14
13.	"Get Up & Do It"	2:25
14.	"Germ Vs. Jerk"	2:55
15.	"The Devil's Ice Age"	3:02

Japanese version bonus tracks
No.	Title	Length
16.	"Wilderness" (Live)	2:24
17.	"Fake" (Live)	2:45
18.	"Time 2 Be Bad" (Live)	3:36
19.	"Tough Times in Plastic Land" (Live)	3:13
20.	"New Breed" (Live)	1:44
21.	"Hornet" (Live)	2:53
22.	"Can't Polish a Turd" (Live)	3:17

== Personnel ==
- Jon Spencer – lyrics, lead vocals, guitar, producer, mixing
- Sam Coomes – vocals, synth
- M. Sord – drums
- Bob Bert – percussion
- Bill Skibbe – producer, mixing
- Brian Fox – assistant producer
- Dave Gardner – mastering
- Katie Skelly – artwork
- Michael Lavine – photography
- Bob Coscarelli – photography

== Release history ==
Release dates and formats for Spencer Gets It Lit
Region	Date	Edition(s)	Format(s)	Label(s)	Ref.
United States	March 31, 2022	Standard	CD	In the Red; Shove	
Canada	April 1, 2022	Standard	CD; digital download; streaming	Bronzerat; Shove	
Europe	April 1, 2022	Standard	CD; digital download; streaming	Bronzerat; Shove	
United States	April 1, 2022	Standard	CD; digital download; streaming	Bronzerat; Shove	
Europe	April 29, 2022	Standard	LP	Bronzerat; Shove	
United States	April 29, 2022	Standard	LP	Bronzerat; Shove	
Europe	April 29, 2022	Limited edition	LP	Bronzerat; Shove	
United States	April 29, 2022	Limited edition	LP	Bronzerat; Shove	
Japan	May 10, 2022	Limited edition	CD	Sony Records Int'l; In the Red; Shove	
United States	August 2022	Standard	LP	In the Red; Shove	
Europe	2022	Limited edition	LP	Bronzerat; Shove	
