= Pride celebrations in the United States =

LGBTQ events in the United States

Pride celebrations occur across the United States during Pride Month, which is observed in June in the U.S., commemorating the anniversary of the Stonewall riots in 1969. Many cities and localities across the U.S. have celebrations, including traditions that have been ongoing for decades.

The first pride celebrations began in the early 1970s in urban areas like New York City and San Francisco, then gradually spread to less populous areas. Pride Month first became a federal observance in June 1999. In the 2020s, pride celebrations became more common in rural areas across the country.

According to the Pew Research Center, most (66%) of the LGBTQ adults in the U.S. have attended at least one pride celebration, and 49% have attended multiple times. Of all non-LGBTQ adults in the U.S., 16% have attended pride celebrations.

== Types of pride celebrations ==
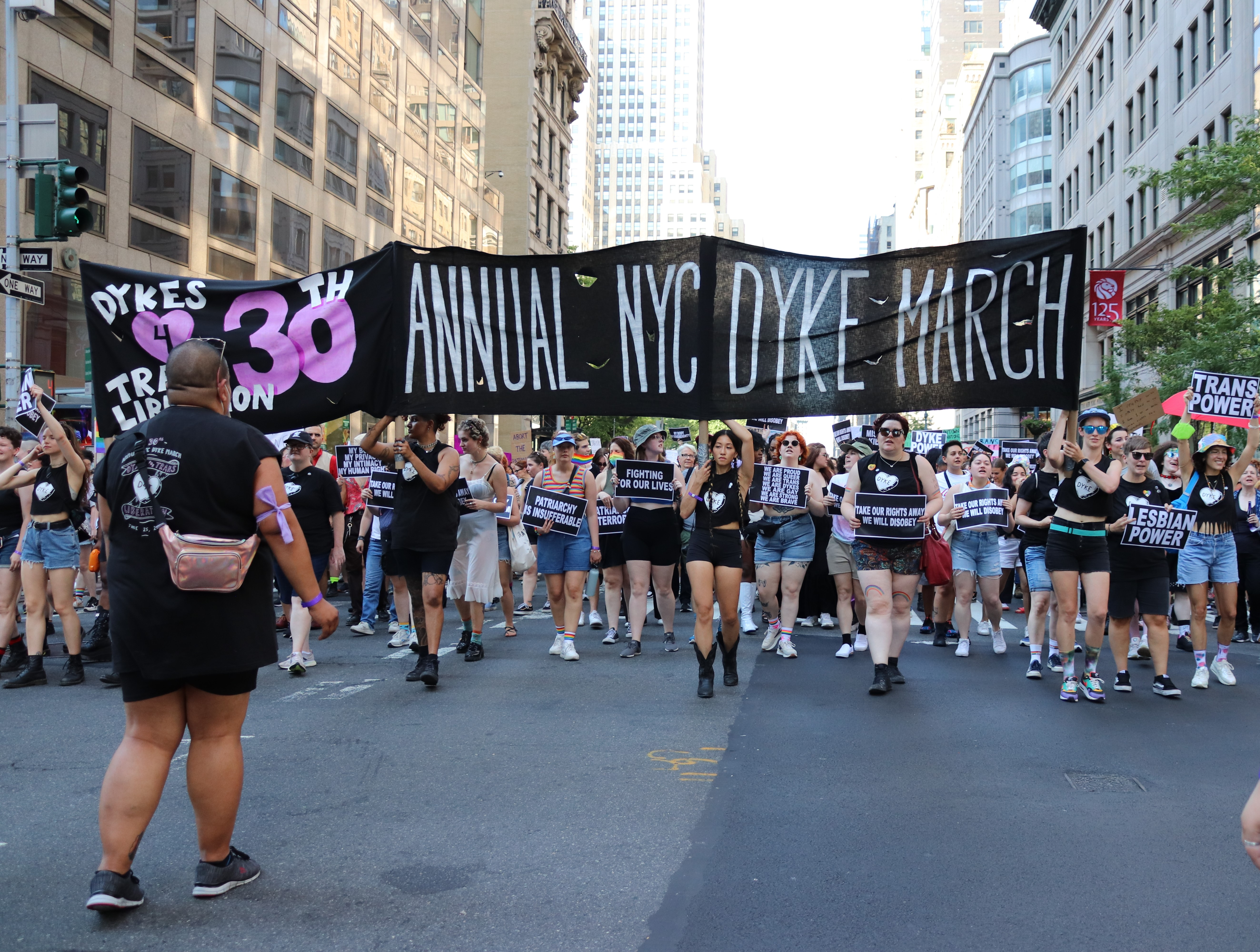
30th annual Dyke March in New York City

Common pride celebration types include parades, festivals, and protests. Pride picnics are also common; for example, Gays Eating Garlic Bread in the Park has been held in various cities across the United States. The U.S. has hosted WorldPride twice: once in New York City in 2019 on the 50th anniversary of the Stonewall riots, and once in Washington, D.C. in 2025 during the second Trump administration despite government actions against LGBTQ people.

Pride parades often feature national groups alongside local ones as a way to honor and celebrate those groups. Dykes on Bikes tend to lead the parade, especially at San Francisco Pride, where the tradition started. Drag performances are common at pride festivals, and in pride parades local drag performers are often highlighted alongside national groups like the Sisters of Perpetual Indulgence. Activist organizations that support or advocate for LGBTQ people are often represented at pride parades; common types include HIV/AIDS activist organizations, LGBTQ-friendly homelessness advocacy groups and shelters, and legal groups like the ACLU. Some parades include grand marshals as a position of honor for individuals who have made significant contributions to the community.

Many celebrations are for the general community, but some are focused on specific groups or subcultures. Common events include Black gay pride, Latino pride, Asian pride, Pacific Islander pride, youth pride, dyke marches, trans marches, trans pride, and leather pride. Curve Magazine is the host of the international Lesbian Visibility Week in the U.S. and across North America.

Some pride celebrations are affiliated with institutions. For example, in the month of June, Playbill prints rainbow versions of their magazine for Broadway shows. Some major league sports teams hold Pride Nights, and some Catholic parishes hold special Masses for pride month. Cities such as New York City and San Francisco hold Pride Runs, and many of these events are organized by the Frontrunners.

== Pride celebrations by state or territory ==
=== Alabama ===
The largest annual pride celebration in Alabama is Central Alabama Pride, which is held in Birmingham and was attended by more than 20,000 people in 2018. Birmingham has had pride celebrations since 1979. Pride on the Plains is also held annually in Auburn, and River City Pride is held in downtown Decatur, Alabama. There are also pride celebrations in Mobile and Fairhope. Florence has held a pride parade since 2017.

=== Alaska ===
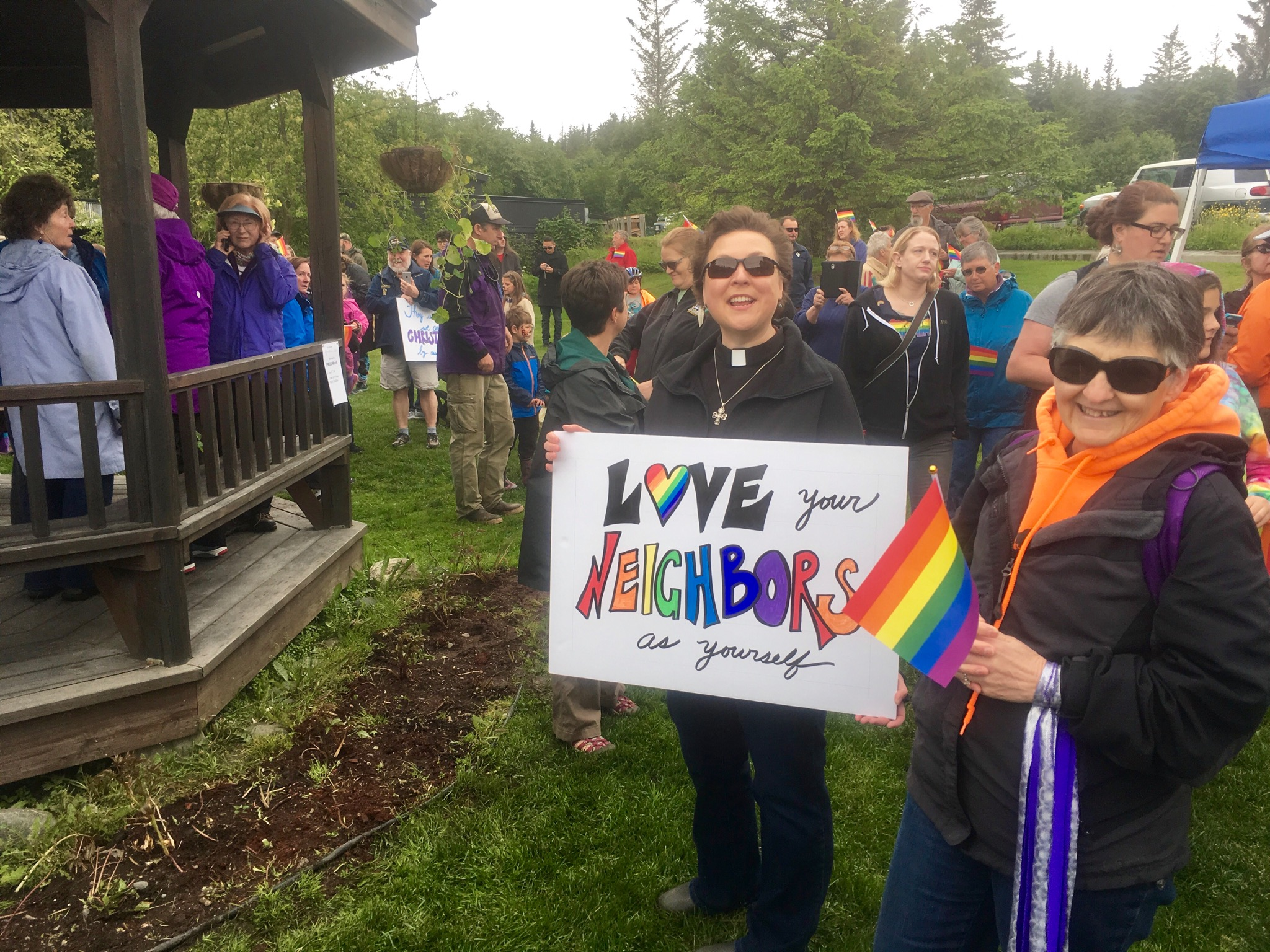
Pride event in Homer, Alaska, 2018

Anchorage has a pride parade in June. The first pride march in Anchorage took place in 1977, and the city has held pride events nearly every year since then. (Note: The pride parade was cancelled in 2013 due to a motor vehicle accident that killed a participant. All pride events in Anchorage were cancelled in 2020 due to the COVID-19 pandemic. The parade was cancelled in 2021 and 2022, but other pride events, such as the annual block party, were held as usual.)

Unalaska has held pride events since the early 2020s. Homer held its first pride celebration in 2018 with around 300 people in attendance, and that same year the Matanuska-Susitna Valley held their first pride celebration in Palmer, Alaska. Other Alaskan localities that have held pride celebrations include Seward and Soldotna.

=== Arizona ===
Phoenix hosts Phoenix Pride every year, but not in June due to heat concerns. Tucson also holds an annual pride event called Pride in the Desert as well as a Latino Pride event. Bisbee has a pride celebration that was attended by 7,000 people in 2026. Flagstaff hosts an annual Pride in the Park event.

The Arizona Diamondbacks have held Pride Nights since 2018, and the Phoenix Mercury have held an annual Pride Day since 2014.

=== Arkansas ===
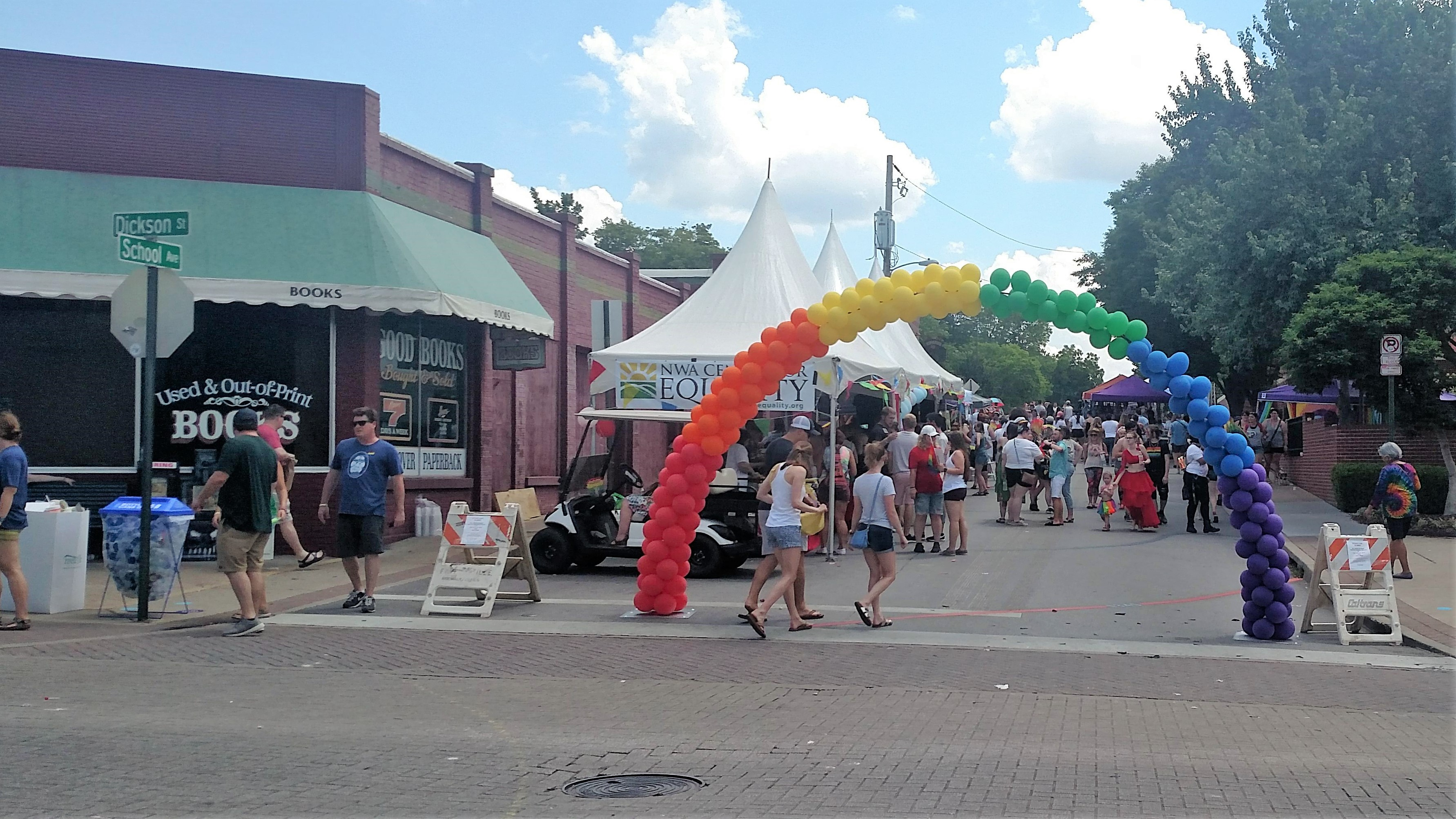
Northwest Arkansas Pride on Dickson Street, Fayetteville in 2018

Arkansas's largest Pride event is Fayetteville's Northwest Arkansas Pride, with more than 35,000 attendees. Other events include Little Rock's Central Arkansas Pride and Little Rock Black Pride, and NEA PRIDEfest in Jonesboro, as well as celebrations in Conway, Eureka Springs, Fort Smith, Hot Springs, Magnolia and Russellville.

=== California ===
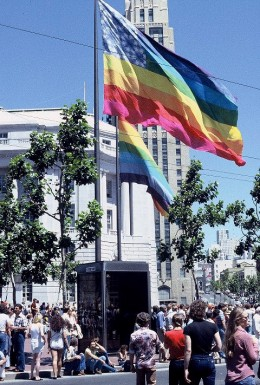
The original rainbow pride flag, designed by Gilbert Baker, was first displayed at San Francisco Pride in 1978.

The largest pride event in California is San Francisco Pride, followed by LA Pride and San Diego Pride. There are additional pride celebrations throughout the state, such as in Santa Cruz, Fresno, and Sacramento.

San Bernardino Black Pride has been celebrated since 2026.

==== Los Angeles ====
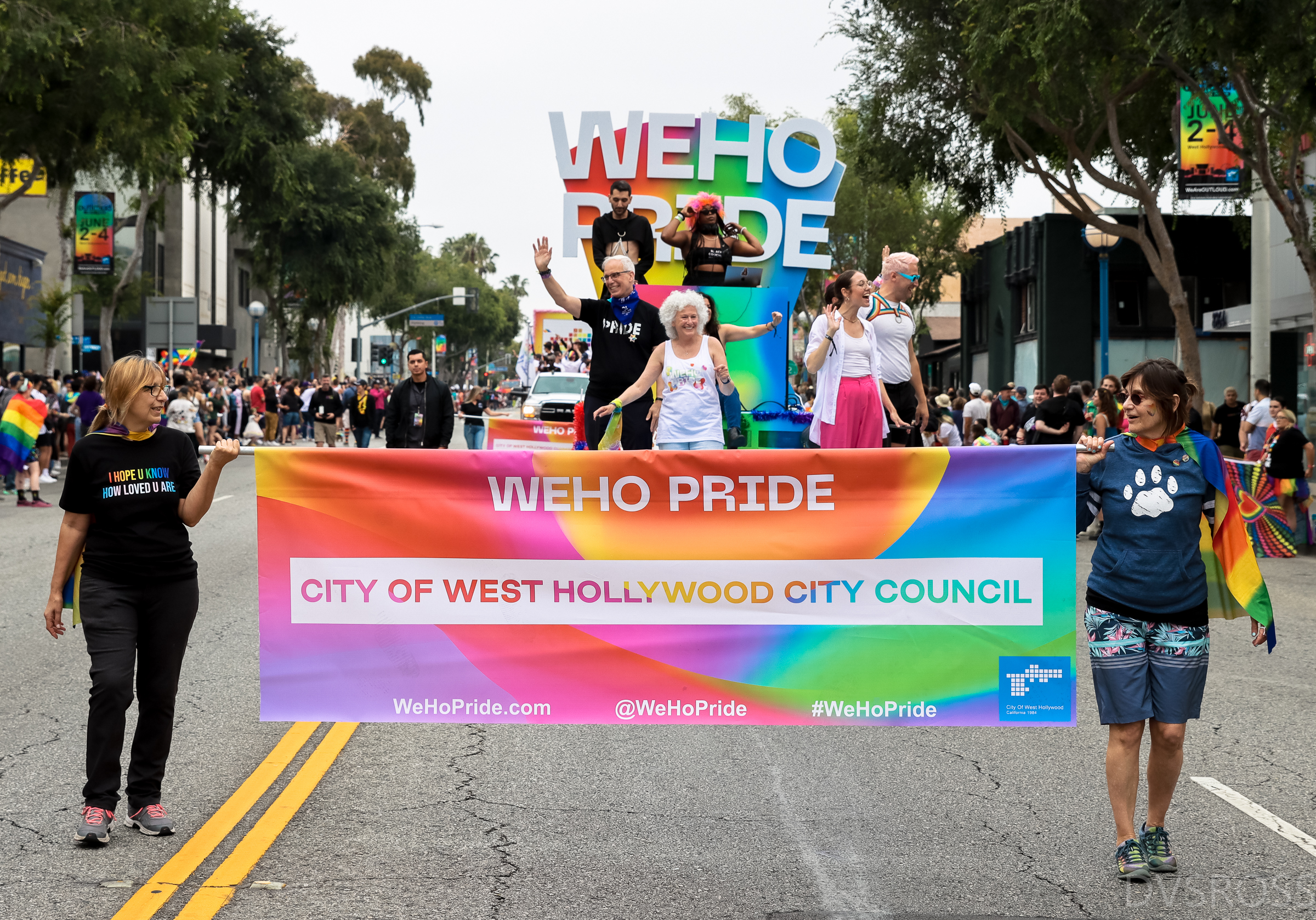
WeHo Pride 2023

Los Angeles has multiple pride celebrations. LA Pride is one of the largest pride events in the world. Long Beach has hosted the Long Beach Pride parade since June 1984. Hermosa Beach has hosted the Hermosa Beach Pride parade since 2021. There are also the DTLA Proud Festival in Downtown Los Angeles, WeHo Pride in West Hollywood, Venice Pride in Venice, SaMo Pride in Santa Monica, and Los Angeles Black Pride.

The first Lesbian Visibility Week celebrations in the United States were held in Los Angeles in the early 1990s, organized by the West Hollywood Lesbian and Gay Advisory Council and the Gay and Lesbian Community Services Center.

Los Angeles Leather Pride is a week-long event held in March, and it ends with the Off Sunset Festival in the Silver Lake neighborhood.

Six Flags Magic Mountain theme park hosts Out on the Mountain, an annual pride event in August.

==== Orange County ====
Though Orange County has historically suffered from an undercurrent of homophobia, multiple pride celebrations take place in the county. The first and largest pride celebration takes place in Santa Ana. Similar events take place in Mission Viejo, Irvine, Ladera, and Fullerton.

Disneyland hosts Disneyland After Dark: Pride Nite at its park in Anaheim. Ikea also hosts a Pride Walk at its Costa Mesa location.

==== San Diego ====
San Diego Pride hosts an annual pride event which, with over 250,000 attendants, is the largest annual single-day civic event in the city of San Diego.

==== San Francisco ====
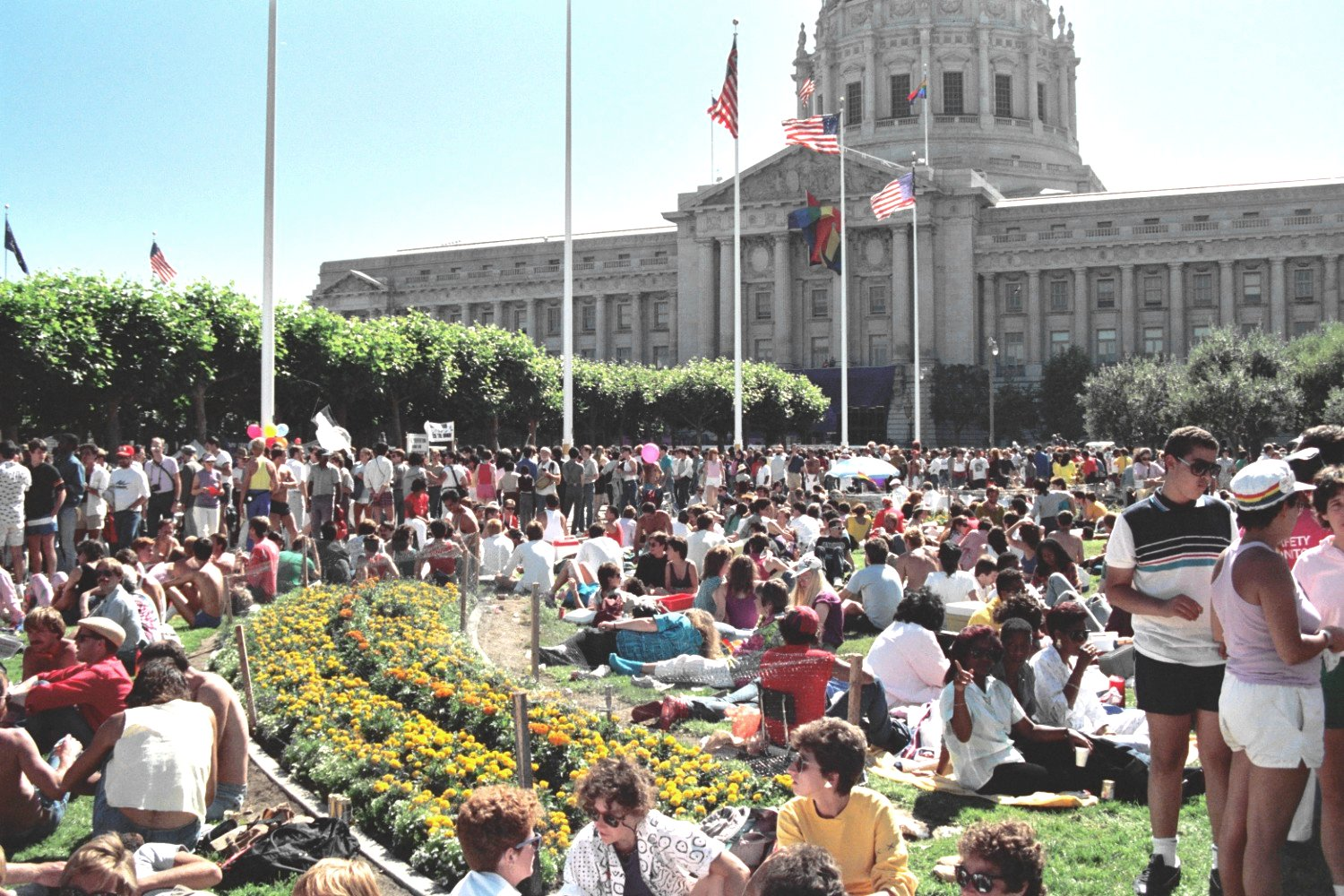
San Francisco Pride, 1986

San Francisco Pride was first held in 1970. The original rainbow flag designed by Gilbert Baker was debuted at the San Francisco Gay Freedom Day parade in June 1978, and a mile-long version of the flag was carried in the parade in 1994. Today, San Francisco Pride is held in June and attended by hundreds of thousands of people. The city also has a Trans March and a Dyke March.

San Francisco's Leather Week is held in September. It begins with a LeatherWalk and ends with the Folsom Street Fair.

The first Pride Run was held in San Francisco in 1981, and San Francisco FrontRunners continue to hold the event today.

==== Sonoma County ====
Sonoma County Pride organizes a pride parade in Santa Rosa each June, along with other events throughout pride month. Santa Rosa also had their first Dyke March in 2026.

=== Colorado ===
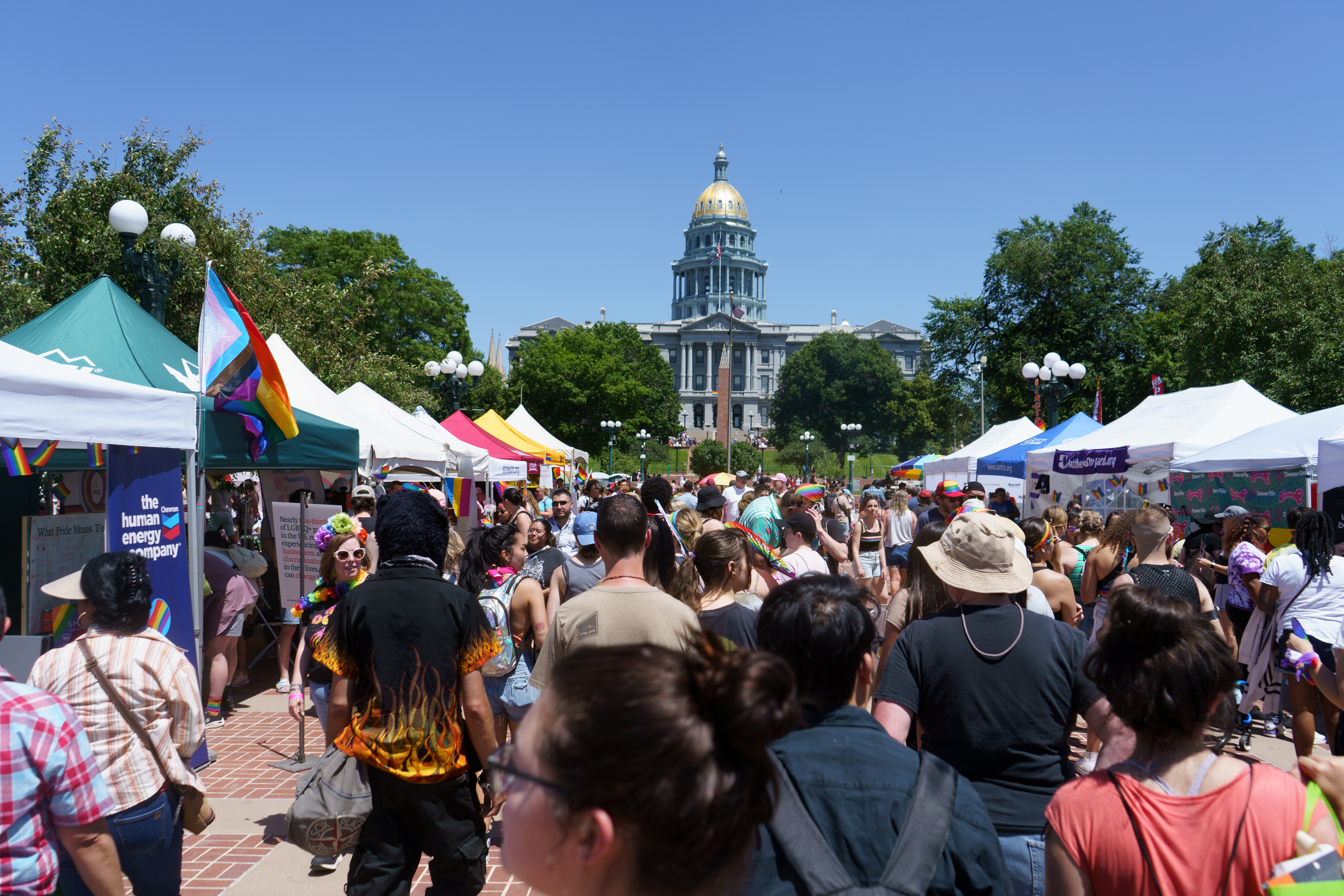
Denver PrideFest, 2023

Denver has hosted an annual PrideFest since June 1974, and the event is attended by around 500,000 people every year. The city hosts a Black Pride event as well. The Pikes Peak Pride parade is held in Colorado Springs; about 40,000 people attended in 2025. Estes Park has held an annual pride celebration since 2023. The NoCo Pride March has been held in Fort Collins since 2019. There are also pride events in Aurora, Avon, Boulder, Grand Junction, and Pueblo.

=== Connecticut ===
The largest pride event in Connecticut is PrideFest Middletown. Other pride events in Connecticut are held in Bridgeport, Glastonbury, Hartford, Mansfield, Mystic, Norwalk, Ridgefield, and Watertown.

=== Delaware ===
The Delaware Pride Festival is the largest annual pride event in Delaware. It was first held in Wilmington in 1997, but has since moved to Dover.

=== Florida ===
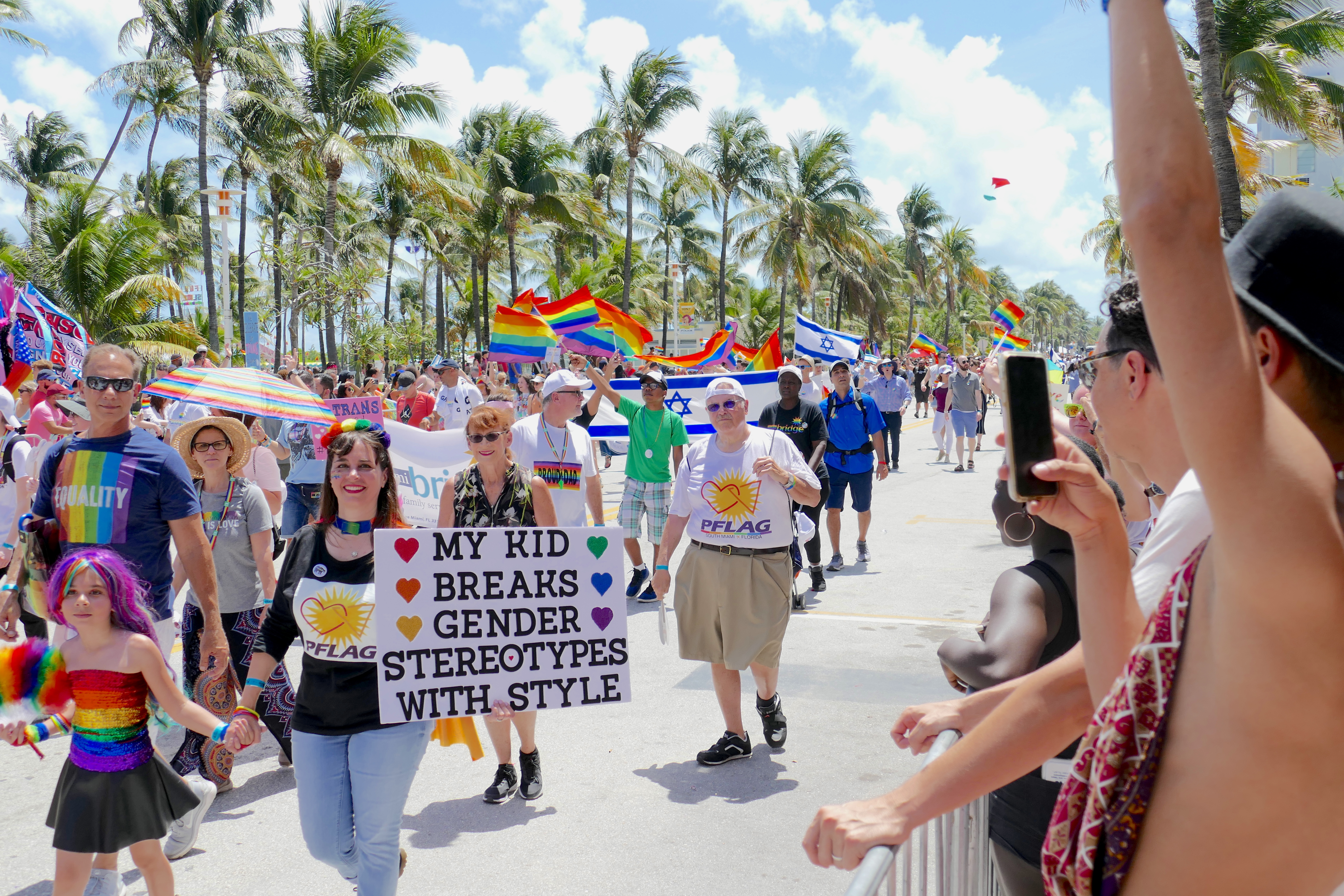
Miami Beach Pride 2019

St. Pete Pride is the largest pride celebration in Florida, with hundreds of thousands in attendance every year. It has been held since 2003 in St. Petersburg.

Naples PrideFest is held in April in Naples, Florida, and River City Pride is held in the Riverside neighborhood of Jacksonville.

Orlando is home to many pride celebrations, several of which are held in memory of the victims of the local Pulse nightclub shooting. The Pulse Day of Remembrance, also known as #OrlandoUnitedDay, is on June 12. On this day, the community gathers to remember and honor the 49 people who were killed at the Pulse Nightclub on June 12, 2016. Pulse Remembrance Events include the Annual CommUNITY Rainbow Run and memorial exhibitions, among others.

Pride events occur throughout June. Dr. Phillips Center for the Performing arts has several shows and events to celebrate the LGBTQ community. Orlando Gay Chorus celebrates Pride with several performances. In 2026, they celebrated Pride with performances in May at the Ritz Theater in Sanford on May 15 and at Dr. Phillips Center for the Performing arts on May 31. Universal CityWalk admission is free and has themed Love is Universal nights every Thursday to Saturday night with music, dancing, and live entertainment. Orlando Bear Pride hosts the Bear Jamboree to kick off Pride Month and Girls in Wonderland is a music festival for queer women.

On the first weekend in June, Gay Days Orlando puts on RED Shirt Pride Day, inviting attendants to wear red to raise visibility and show solidarity with the LGBTQ community. The event was first held in 1991. In 2026, it was cancelled amid mounting pressure from state politicians and a broader anti-LGBTQ backlash across the country, although organizers said the event would return in a modified form in the future. For 30 years, One Magical Weekend at Walt Disney World Resort has brought together thousands of LGBTQ travelers from around the world, and the Pride Cup is an LGBTQ sports competition also held that weekend.

St. Pete Pride has been celebrated in St. Petersburg since 2003.

Each October, Lake Eola Park in downtown Orlando hosts the Come Out With Pride parade in honor of National Coming Out Day.

There have been Black Pride events in Fort Lauterdale and Wilton Manors since 2025.

Polk Pride is held in Lakeland, Florida.

=== Georgia ===
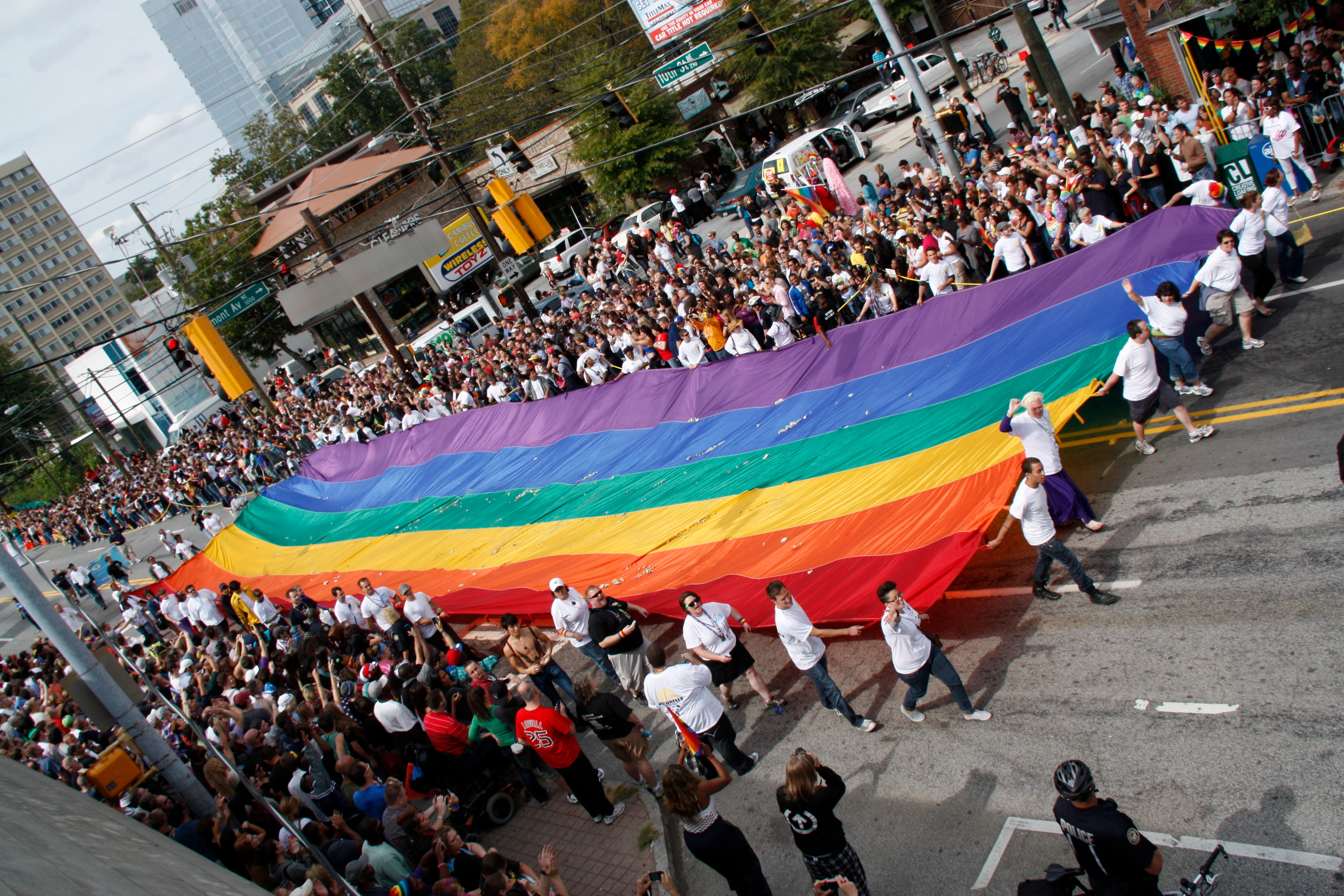
Atlanta Pride 2011

Atlanta Pride is the largest pride celebration in the South, and the largest free pride parade in the U.S. It was established in 1971. The Atlanta pride parade is in October every year (corresponding with National Coming Out Day). Atlanta Black Pride centers Atlanta's Black LGBTQ community. Other pride celebrations in the state include Augusta Pride (established in 2010), Southern Fried Queer Pride, and celebrations in Athens, Columbus, Rome, Savannah, and Smyrna.

=== Guam ===
Historically, LGBTQ people in Guam held discreet, indoor pride celebrations. In 2016, Lasia Casil founded Guam LGBT Pride, and that June the organization held "a small festival on the beach", marking Guam's first documented pride celebration to take place outdoors. The first pride march in Guam was held in 2017, and in 2018 hundreds of people joined the march and beach festival in Tumon. The government of Guam has officially supported pride month since 2021, and now holds an annual celebration with official proclamations and the raising of the pride flag over the Adelup government complex in Hagåtña.

St. John the Divine Episcopal Church in Tamuning has held special services for pride month since at least 2009.

=== Hawaii ===
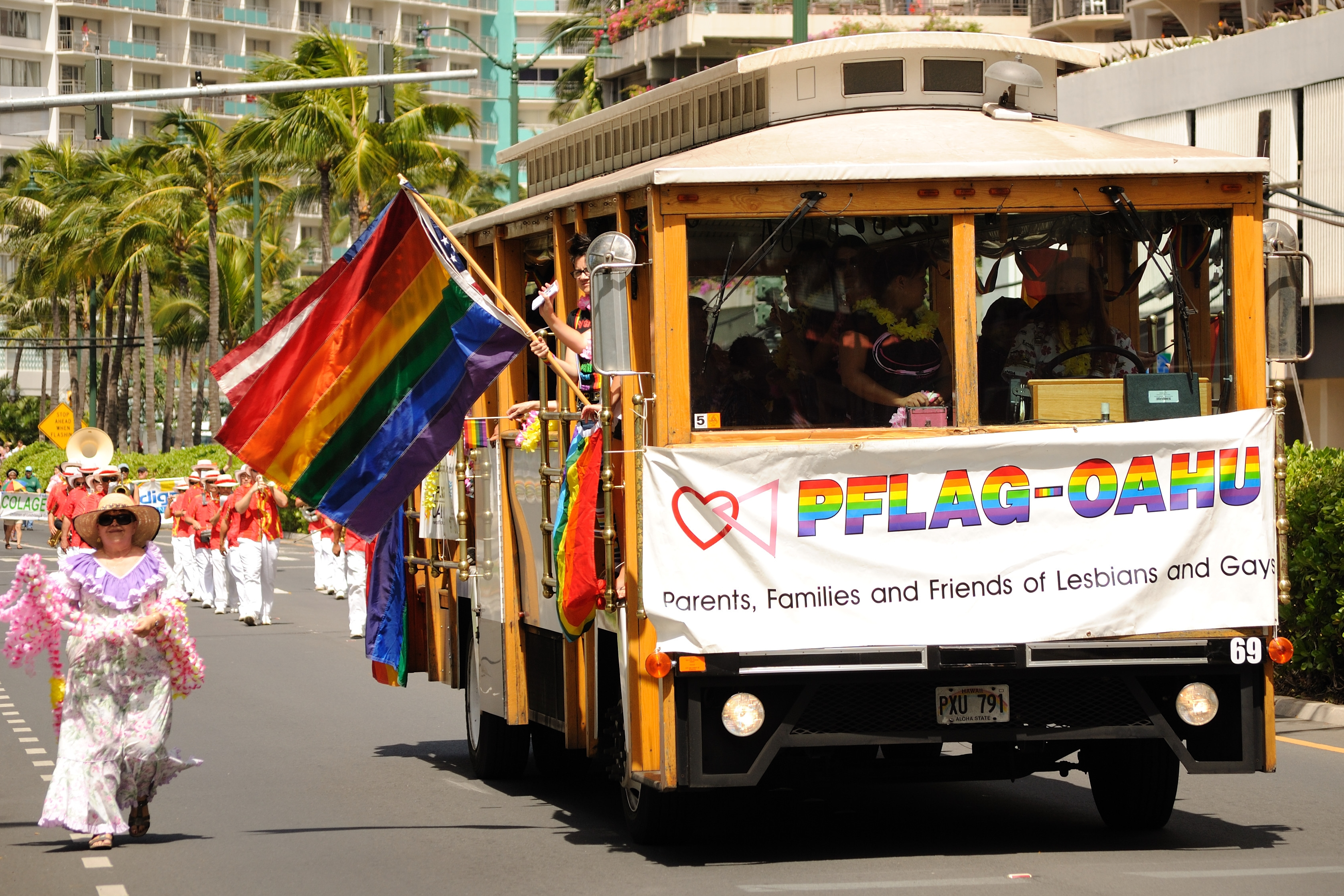
Local PFLAG at Honolulu Pride, 2012

The first pride event in Hawaii was a march held in 1974, with around 25 people in attendance. Today, a pride parade and other events are held annually in the Waikīkī neighborhood of Honolulu. Pride Month is celebrated in October in Honolulu, but there are events in June as well, including the governor's pride flag raising ceremony and performances by the Rainbow Chorus of Honolulu. The Honolulu AIDS Walk is held annually, and is one of the biggest LGBTQ events in the state; the first one took place in 1991.

On Maui, Pride Month is celebrated in June and includes a pride festival. Kauaʻi also has its own pride parade and festival. Lanai Pride is celebrated in Dole Park, Lānaʻi City.

=== Idaho ===
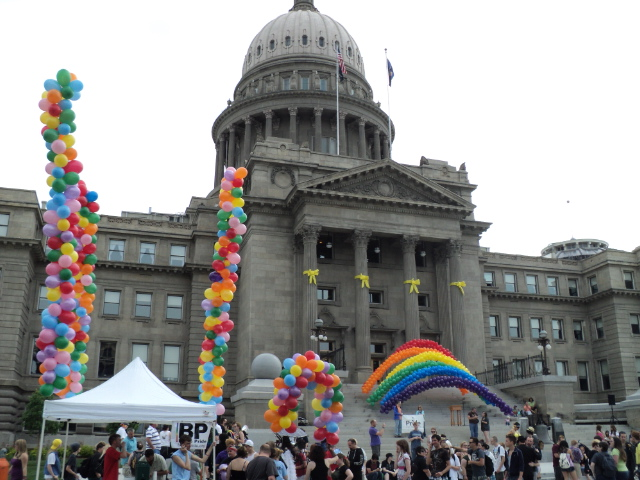
Boise Pride at Idaho's state capitol building, 2011

The Boise Pride Festival has been held annually in Boise each September since 1989. North Idaho Pride Alliance has held an annual Pride in the Park event in Couer d'Alene since 2016, and "hosts monthly social gatherings called Queer Connections". The Canyon County Pride Festival has been held in Nampa since 2024, with up to 4,000 people in attendance. The Idaho Falls Pride Parade and Festival is held annually in Idaho Falls.

=== Illinois ===
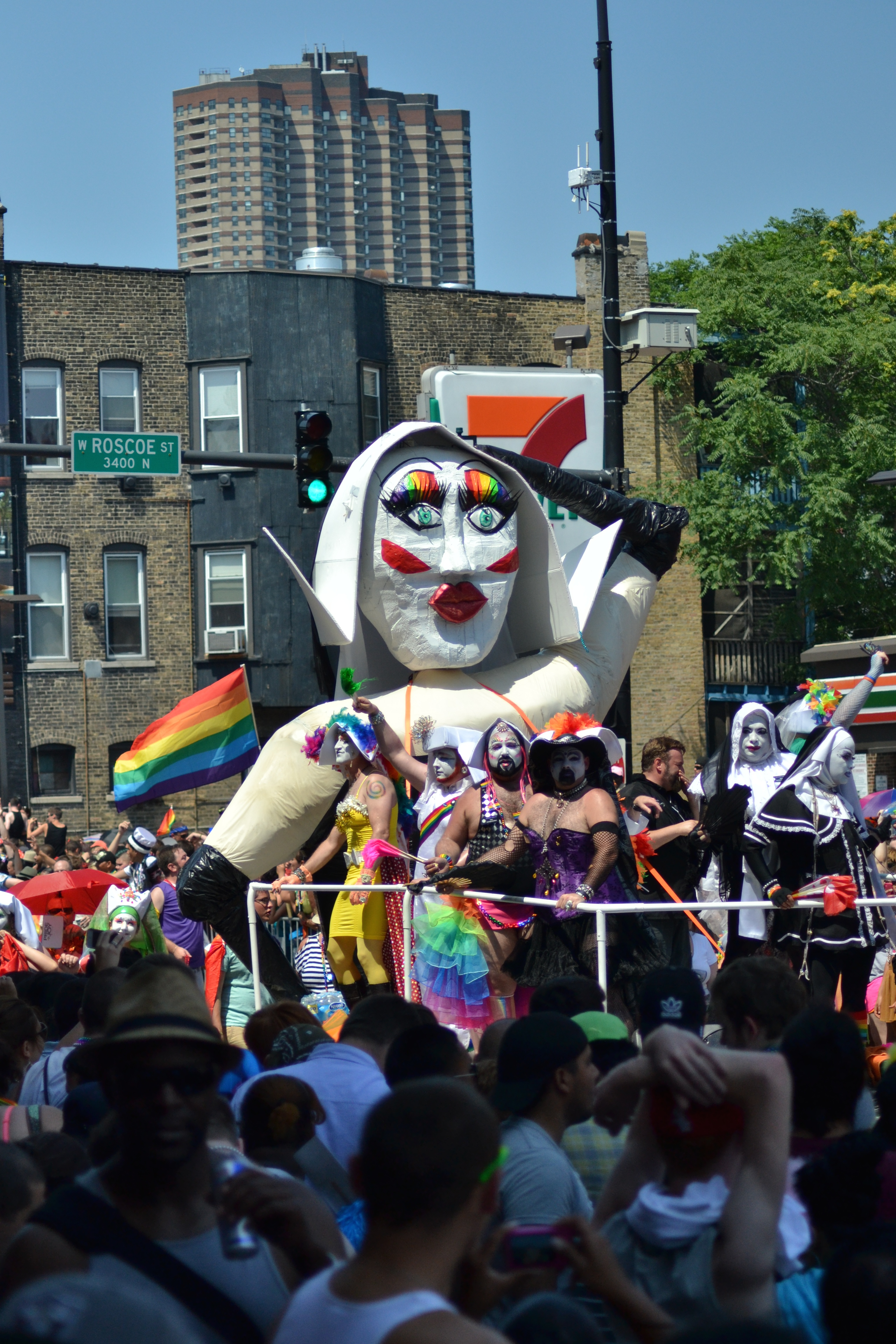
Sisters of Perpetual Indulgence float at Chicago Pride, 2012

Inspired by the Stonewall Riots, Chicago, Illinois was the first city to host a Gay Liberation March on June 27, 1970. The event transformed into today's Chicago Pride Parade.

Chicago Black Pride has been held since 1999.

The Buffalo Grove Pride event in Chicago's Buffalo Grove neighborhood was established in 2019 by Molly Pinta, who was thirteen years old at the time. About 5,000 people attended the parade in 2024.

Chicago Leather Pride Weekend began in 2025 and is celebrated in May at the Leather Archives & Museum. Chicago also hosts the International Mr. Leather convention during Memorial Day weekend.

=== Indiana ===
In Fort Wayne, Indiana, Pride is held in July. The first event took place in 1998.

Indy Pride holds events in Indianapolis. The organization held its first pride event in 1995.

=== Iowa ===
Des Moines hosts two annual pride celebrations: Capital City Pride, and Des Moines People's Pride. SUX Pride is held in Sioux City, and there are pride events in Burlington, Ottumwa, Dubuque, and Valley Junction.

=== Kansas ===
Kansas City has hosted the largest pride parade in Kansas since 1977. Other pride celebrations are held in Topeka and Salina.

=== Kentucky ===
The Kentuckiana Pride Festival is held in Louisville, Kentucky, the Northern Kentucky Pride Parade and Festival is held in Covington, and there is also a pride festival in Lexington. Pikeville Pride is an annual festival that has been held in Pikeville since 2018.

=== Louisiana ===
==== New Orleans ====
Several pride events are held annually in New Orleans, such as Southern Decadence and New Orleans Pridefest. These both began in the 1970s, and occur during labor day weekend and mid-June, respectively. Southern Decadence, which originally began as a small house party, has grown into one of the largest events in New Orleans, drawing "an annual economic impact of more than $215 million." Black Pride New Orleans is a weekend event held in June. There is also a Gay Easter Parade held on the same day as Easter in the French Quarter since 2000.

==== Baton Rouge ====
The capital city of Baton Rouge also has an annual Pride Festival during June. Held in downtown Baton Rouge's River Center, it includes drag performances, local craft vendors, relevant resources, and other stalls. The annual June pride festival, and other community events has been put on by the Baton Rouge Pride nonprofit since 2007.

=== Maine ===
The first pride celebration in Portland was held in 1987, and Portland Pride continues to be celebrated today. According to the Portland Police, about 10,000 people attended the parade in 2019.

The largest pride celebration in central Maine is Bangor Pride, which takes place each June in Bangor. The town's first pride parade was held in 1992, and the event has been planned by the local chapter of Health Equity Alliance (HEAL) since 2017.

Ogunquit holds annual pride celebrations and held their first LGBTQ protest in 1975.

Rockland has held pride celebrations alongside other summer festivals since 2023, and in 2026 had their first standalone Rockland Pride celebration.

Bar Harbor Pride holds many pride events in Bar Harbor throughout the month of June.

Pride in the 'Bunks is Kennebunkport's annual pride celebration and has been held since 2021.

Other pride celebrations are held in Belfast, Bethel, Brunswick, Denmark, Eastport, Gouldsboro, Hallowell, Lewiston–Auburn, Rockport, Sanford, Waterville, and Yarmouth.

=== Maryland ===
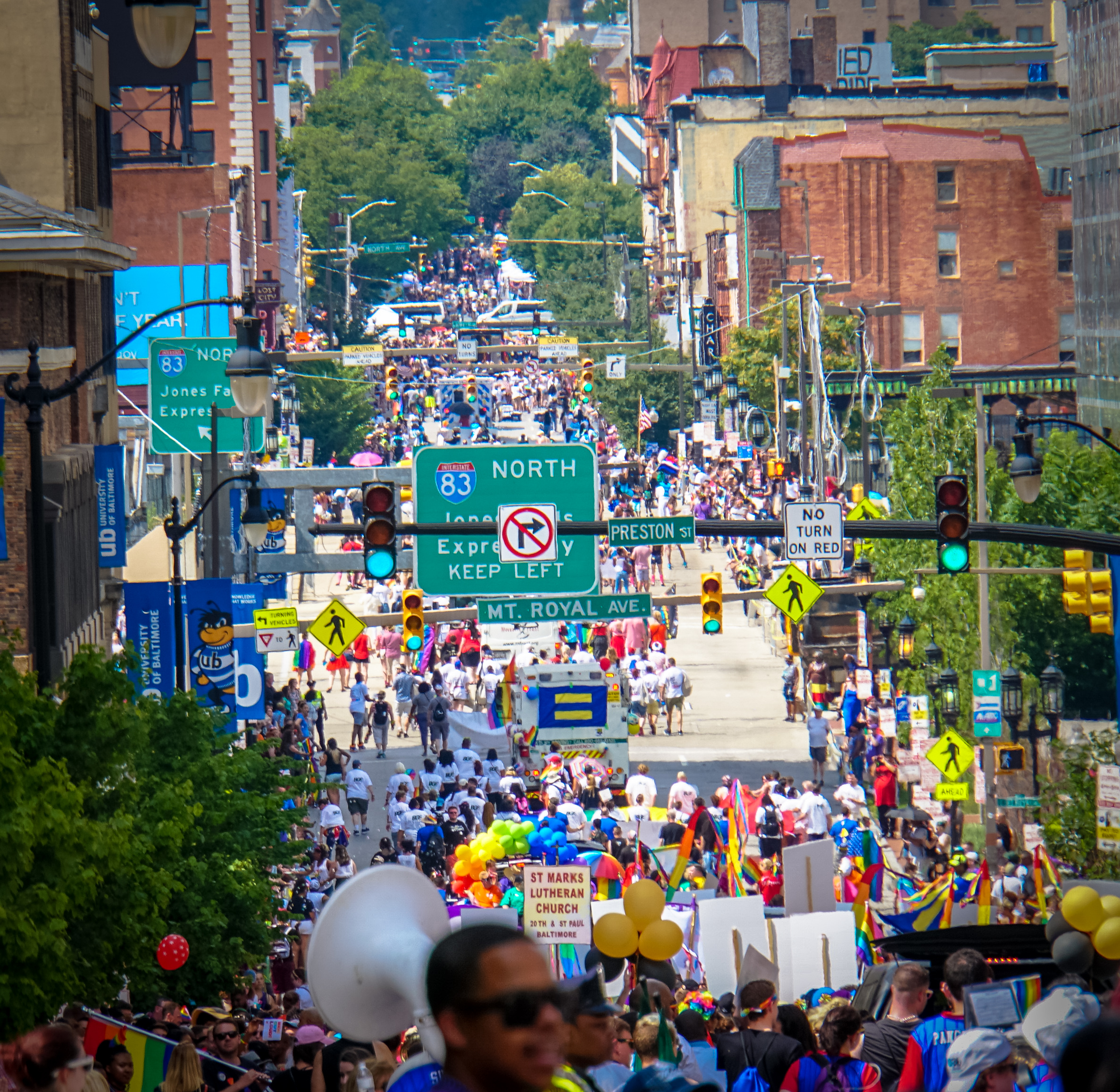
Baltimore Pride 2016

Ocean City has held an annual pride parade since 2022. The pride parade in Salisbury is hosted by PFLAG and held in October. Annapolis Pride is also held in October.

The first Pride celebration in Baltimore was held at the Washington Monument in June 1975, and now Baltimore Pride is held annually in Mount Vernon, the city's gayborhood. Baltimore also has a trans pride celebration separate from the main pride parade.

=== Massachusetts ===
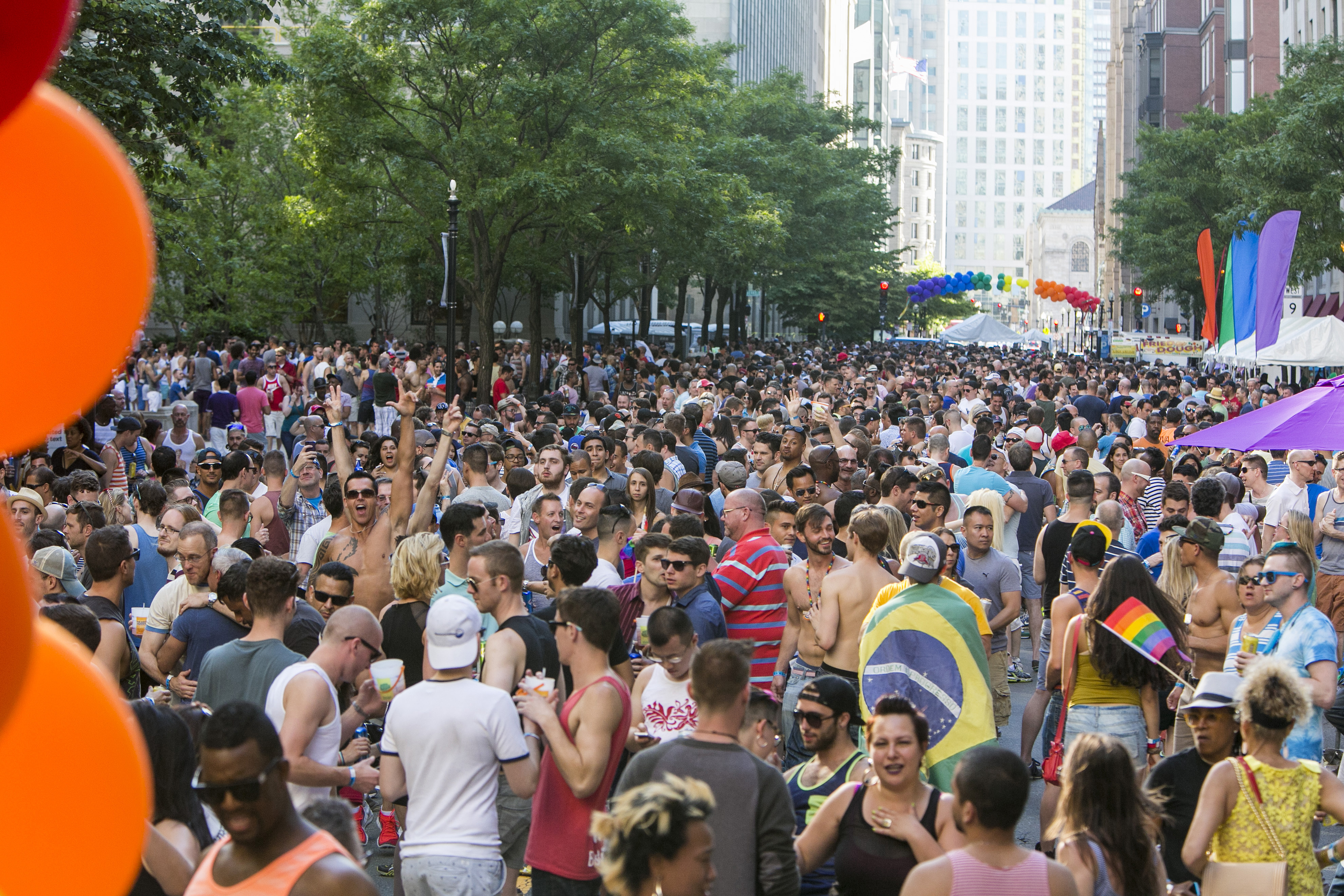
Boston Pride, 2016

Boston Pride was established in 1970 as "a series of workshops" that evolved into a pride march in 1971. According to NBC, in 2025 about one million people participated in the pride parade and festival.

Provincetown holds an annual pride celebration, and a week of events for Lesbian Visibility Week.

There are also annual pride events in Amherst, Belchertown, Bellingham, Belmont, Berkshire, Braintree, Cambridge, Cape Ann/Gloucester, Chicopee, Concord, Danvers, Fall River, Framingham, Franklin/Greenfield, Holliston, Holyoke, Hopkinton, Hull, Lee, Lenox, Longmeadow, Lowell, Lower Cape Cod/Orleans, Martha's Vineyard/Oak Bluffs, Maynard, Newburyport, New Bedford, North Adams, North Shore/Salem, Northampton, Pittsfield, Plymouth, Quincy, Revere, Sheffield, South Coast/Taunton, Springfield, Sudbury, Topsfield, Watertown, Worcester, Waltham, and Westfield.

Communities that previously held pride celebrations, but no longer hold them include Nashoba Valley/Bolton and Fitchburg.

=== Michigan ===
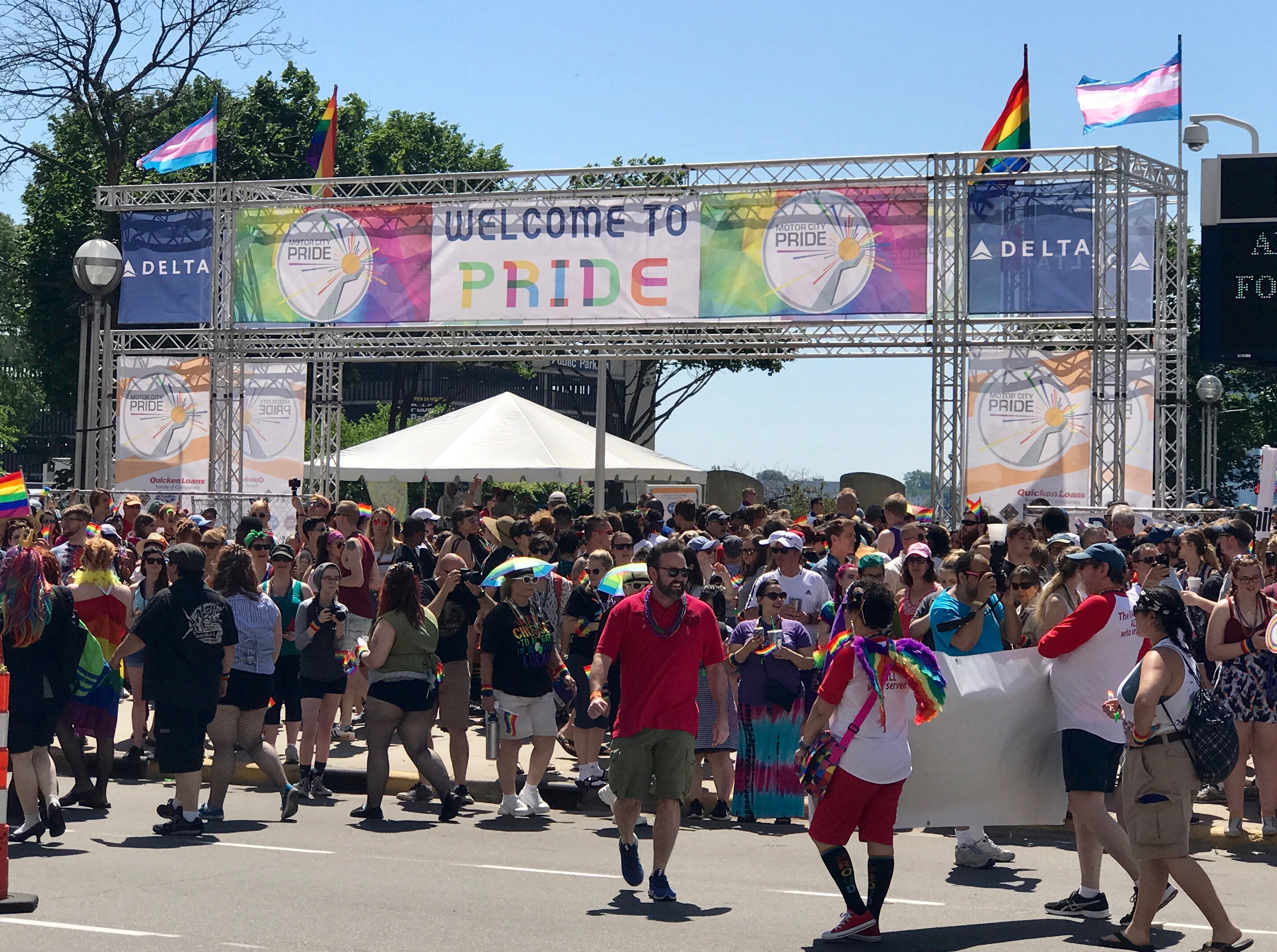
Motor City Pride 2017

The largest Pride festival and parade in Michigan is Motor City Pride, held annually in June in Detroit. It originated as a march, but developed to include a picnic and festival. Grand Rapids has hosted annual pride celebrations since 1998. Owosso held their first annual pride festival in 2022.Ferndale has held Ferndale Pride since 2025.

Kalamazoo Pride is the second-largest pride celebration in Michigan and the largest annual festival in Kalamazoo. It has been an official parade since 2007. Kalamazoo organizers also plan to hold their first Black Pride event in August 2026.

Other late May and early June gatherings include those in Muskegon, Marquette, and Lansing. Unlike most other cities, Ann Arbor holds its city-wide Pride festival in August, with a second, smaller event usually held in late August or early September, to coincide with University of Michigan students returning to campus. Hotter Than July is a Black LGBTQ celebration held in Detroit in July.

=== Minnesota ===
Twin Cities Pride is a festival held annually in June in Minneapolis. It is the second largest festival held in the state of Minnesota. Duluth Superior Pride is held in Duluth in August, during Labor Day Weekend. Pine City held their first pride celebration in 2005.

=== Mississippi ===
The first pride parades in Mississippi were held in the 1990s in Ocean Springs and Oxford; it is unclear which came first. Outoberfest began in 2005 in Jackson and later became Pride Mississippi. Starting in 2015, annual pride parades were held in Jackson, Oxford (2016), Biloxi, Ocean Springs, and Hattiesburg, and many of these events persist today. Starkville has held an annual pride parade since 2018, aside from a two-year hiatus due to the COVID-19 pandemic.

=== Missouri ===
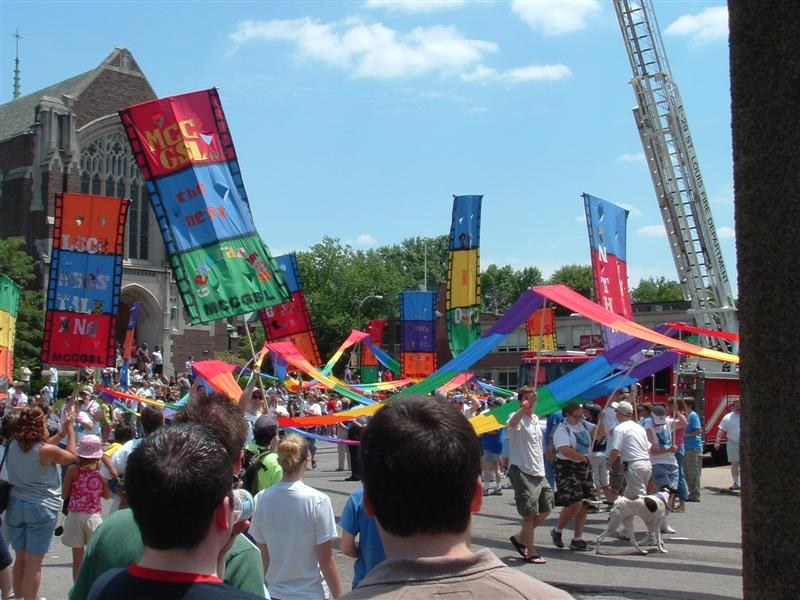
St. Louis PrideFest, 2004

KC Pride has been held in June in Kansas City, Missouri since 1975. Ozarks Pridefest is held annually in Springfield, Missouri, and St. Louis PrideFest is held annually in June.

=== Montana ===
The Montana Pride Parade is held every August in Helena, the state's capital. Smaller local pride events take place in Billings, Missoula, Anaconda, Butte, and Libby. Big Sky OUT also puts on a week-long winter pride celebration in January.

=== Nebraska ===
The first pride march in Nebraska was organized in Omaha in 1985, and grew every year until it was safe enough to host the first pride parade in the state in 1988. The city now hosts the Heartland Pride parade every year.

Lincoln, Nebraska held their first pride parade in 2021. Grand Island also has pride celebrations.

=== Nevada ===
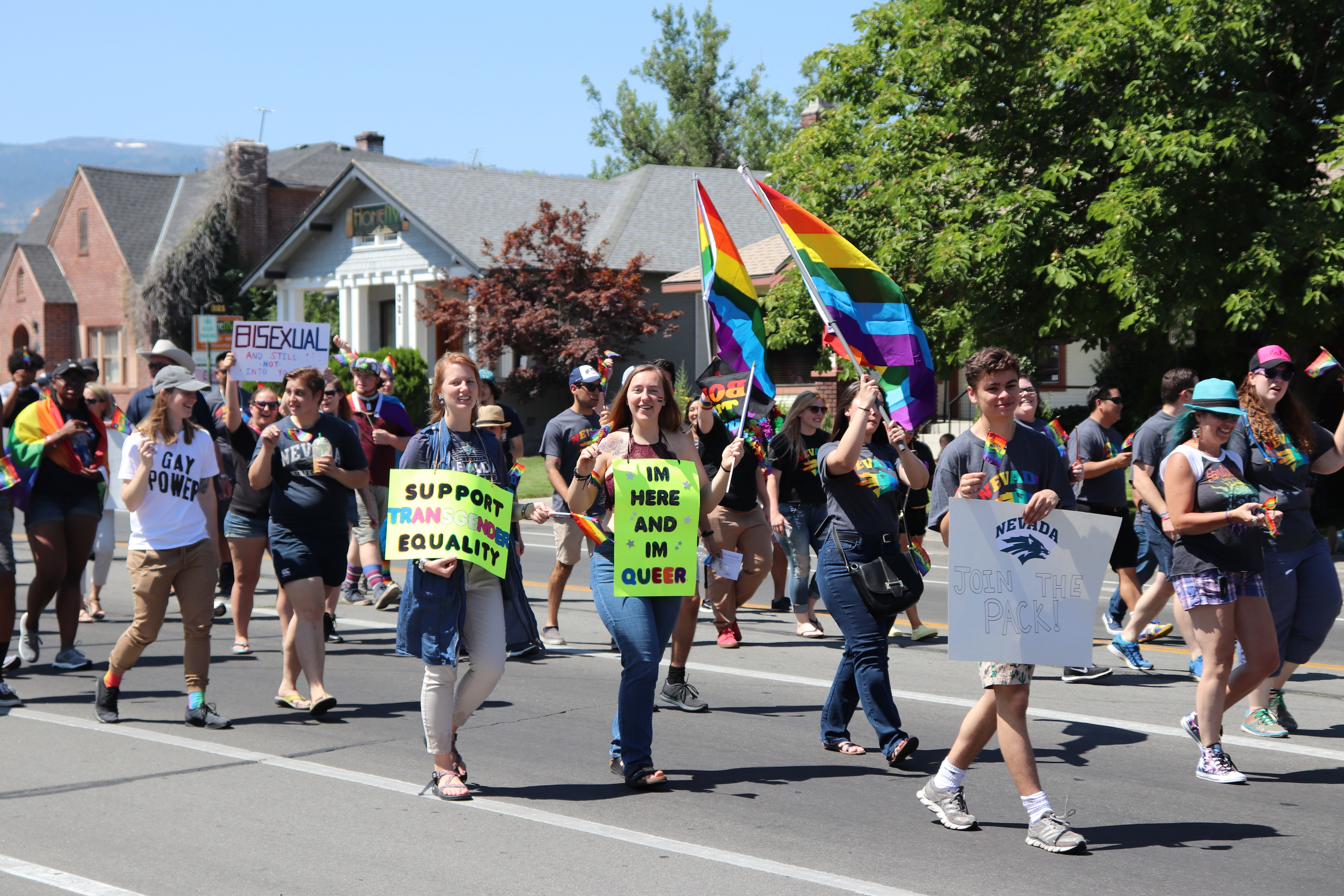
Northern Nevada Pride, 2017

Southern Nevada Pride Fest has been held in Sunset Park in Las Vegas. Las Vegas PRIDE began holding pride events in the city in 1983, held the city's first pride parade in 1993, and now puts on events throughout the year, including a series of events for Pride Month and the Las Vegas Pride Festival every year in October. Many resorts, casinos, and other entertainment establishments in Las Vegas hold pride events in June.

According to Nicholas Villanueva Jr., the first pride celebration in Reno was the gay rodeo in 1976, and annual celebrations during pride month were organized later. Gay rodeo is no longer held regularly in Reno, but in the 2020s some gay rodeos have been held in Reno and Las Vegas, and Northern Nevada Pride is currently celebrated in Reno every year in July.

=== New Hampshire ===
The first Pride Day in Portsmouth was in 2014.

Claremont held their first pride celebration in 2026.

Other pride festivals are held in Concord, Keene, Littleton, Manchester, Milford, Nashua, North Conway, and Windham.

=== New Jersey ===
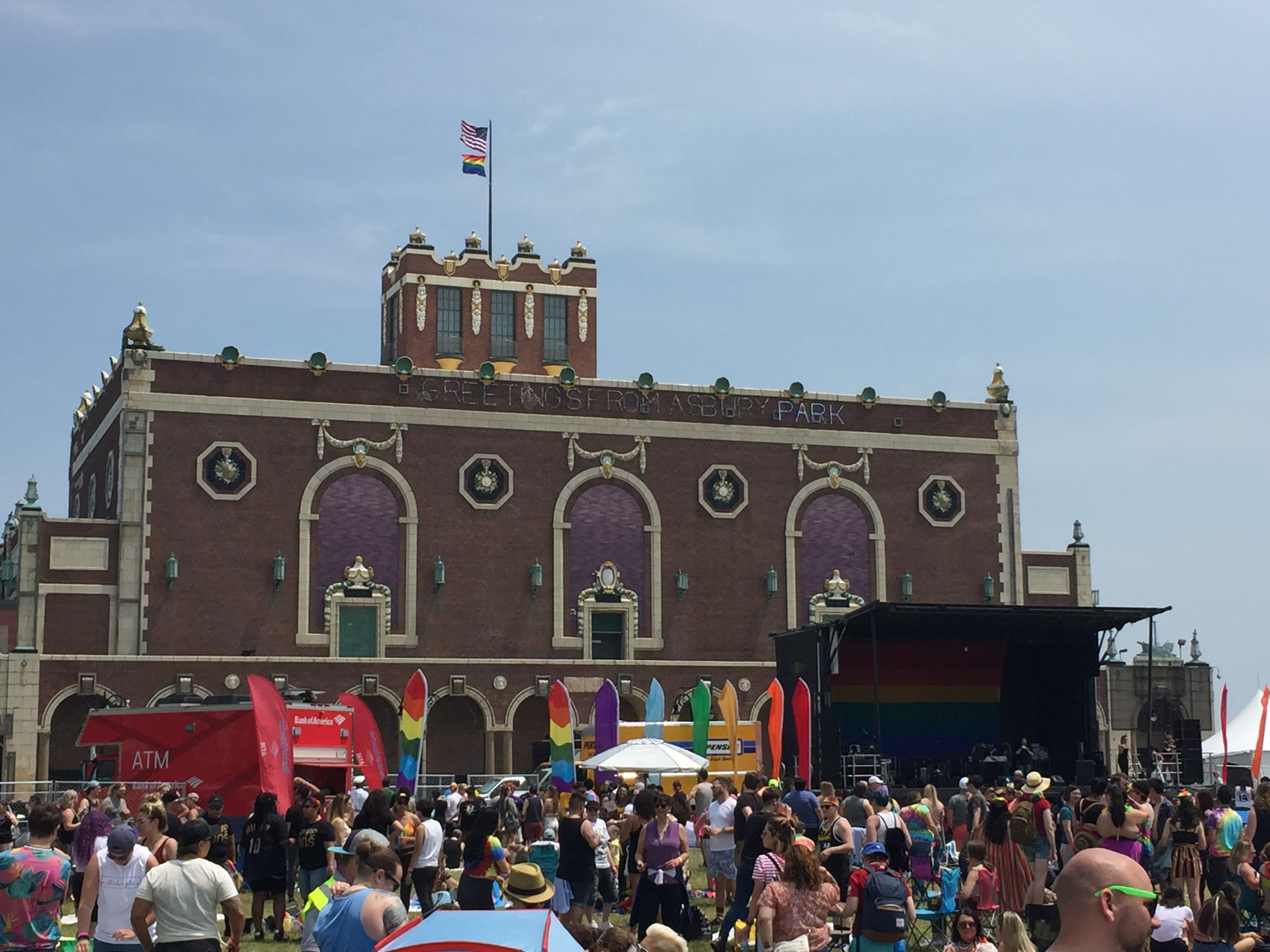
Asbury Park Convention Hall during Jersey Pride, 2019

The first pride celebration in New Jersey was Jersey Pride, held in Asbury Park in 1992. About 1,500 people attended. Today, it is the largest pride celebration in the state, with over 20,000 people attending every year. There is also a Union County LGBTQ+ Pride 5K and Color Run, held in June in Oak Ridge Park since 2024.

The Newark pride festival was founded in 2005 after the murder of Sakia Gunn, a hate crime committed in Newark, galvanized the local LGBTQ community.

The North Jersey Pride Festival started in 2011 as a picnic at a park in Maplewood and grew into a full festival.

Atlantic City and Trenton also have pride festivals.

=== New York ===
==== New York City ====
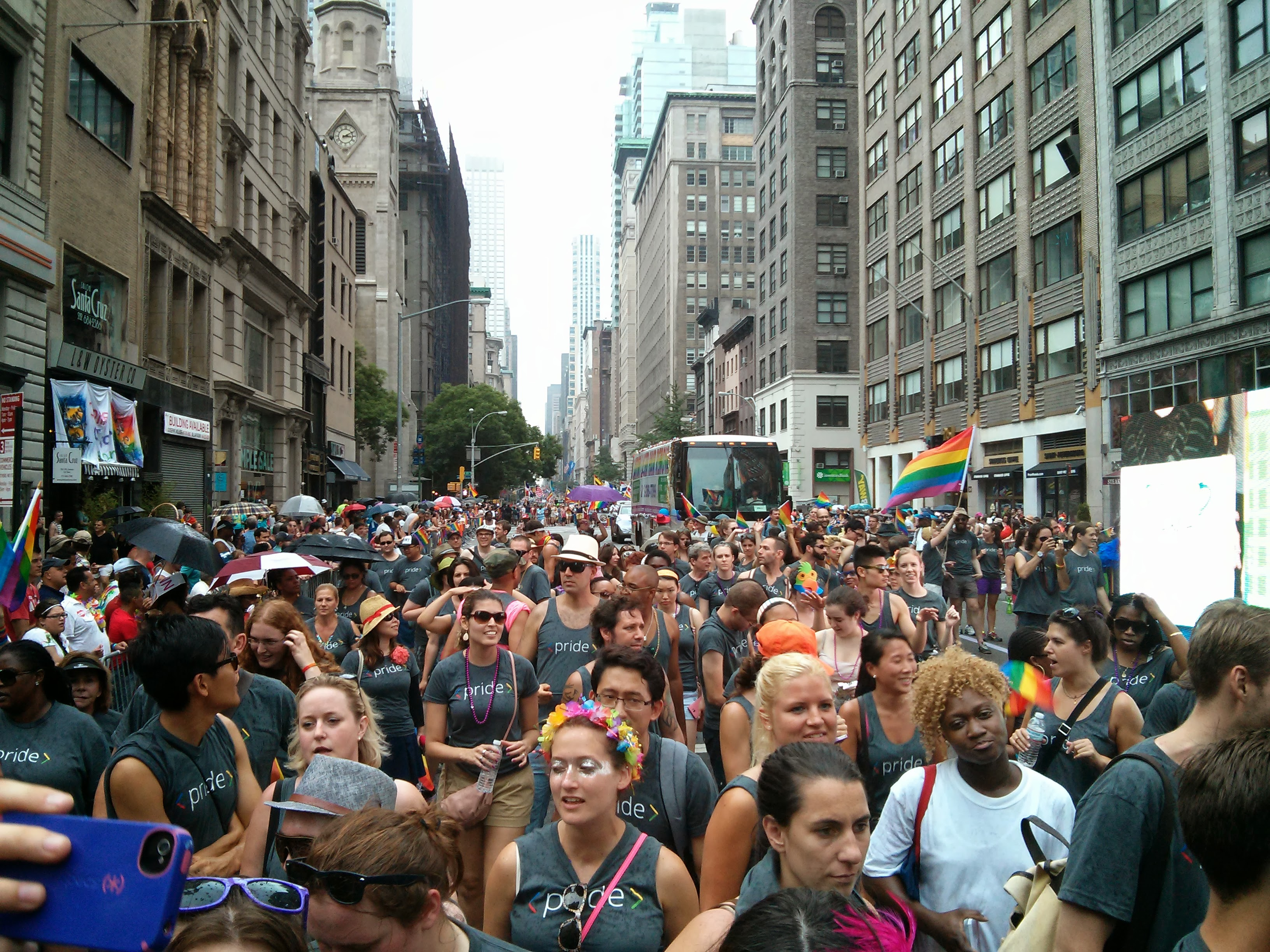
New York City Pride March, 2013

New York City has many Pride celebrations. The largest event is the NYC Pride March, held on the last Sunday in June in the West Village. Heritage of Pride, a nonprofit organization, plans the march. It is one of the largest pride events in the world; 2.5 million people participated in the pride march in 2024. On the same day, there is also the Queer Liberation March held annually since 2019 as a protest-oriented alternative to the larger Pride parade that has been criticized for the presence of police and corporations. The Dyke March has been an annual event in New York City since 1993, and currently it is held on the last Saturday in June. Out at St. Paul organizes an annual pride Mass at the Stonewall National Monument. Front Runners New York has held Pride Runs in Central Park since 1982.

New York City has many smaller celebrations in all five of its boroughs. The Queens Pride Parade has been held on the first Saturday in June since 1993. The Queens neighborhood of Astoria has its own pride march, first held in 2021 after the COVID-19 pandemic lockdowns were lifted. Brooklyn hosts its pride celebration as a whole week of events leading up to a march. The first Brooklyn pride march was staged in 1996, and Brooklyn Youth Pride was first added to the event lineup in 2022. The Bronx has a pride parade and festival. Staten Island also holds a pride festival, organized by the Pride Center of Staten Island.

==== Long Island ====
Long Island has held a pride celebration in Huntington Village since 1991 (after a denied permit and a court case), organized by Long Island Pride.

==== Albany ====
Albany has held its Capital Pride parade since 1997. Albany has also had a gay pride celebration for LGBTQ people of color since 2006; it was originally called Say it Loud! Black & Latino Gay Pride, but was renamed Say It Loud! BIPOC Pride in 2023.

==== Buffalo ====
Pride celebrations have been held in Buffalo since 1993. Thousands of people attend the Buffalo Pride parade every year.

==== Rochester ====
Rochester celebrates Pride during July. The first Pride celebration in Rochester was a picnic that took place in July 1971, which developed into a tradition of holding the annual Pride Parade and Festival in July rather than June.

==== Others ====
The Lower Adirondack Pride Festival has been held in Glens Falls since 2023. Troy has an annual flag raising event.

=== North Carolina ===
In North Carolina, pride celebrations are held in Asheville, Bakersville, Belmont, Boone, Carrboro, Chapel Hill, Charlotte, Durham, Fayetteville, Greensboro, Greenville, Hendersonville, Hickory, Hiddenite, Holly Springs, Huntersville, Lexington, Manteo, Matthews, Monroe, Morganton, New Bern, Pinehurst, Pittsboro, Raleigh, Salisbury, Statesville, Sylva, Wake Forest, Waynesville, Wilmington, Wilson, and Winston–Salem.

The first pride celebration in Charlotte was Gay Pride Day in June 1981. A statewide pride celebration was held there in 1994.

Asheville held their first pride event in 1989 at Hairspray, a local lesbian bar. One attendant estimated that 200 to 300 people were there.

=== North Dakota ===
Grand Forks held their first pride parade in 2025. There are also pride celebrations in Bismarck, Fargo–Moorhead, and Minot.

=== Northern Mariana Islands ===
Pride Marianas, founded by Roberto Santos and Jennifer Maratita, puts on pride events in the Commonwealth of the Northern Mariana Islands (CNMI). The territory's first pride celebration was held in 2018 and featured drag and dance performances by local groups; about 60 people attended. Pride Marianas Youth also holds events for the community and focuses on supporting young LGBTQ people; their events have included a Pride at the Park celebration and a Drag Race for runners. In 2022, the government officially proclaimed June to be pride month in CNMI, and a rally was held in celebration. Mama Rio's Café in Garapan, Saipan is a hub for LGBTQ pride celebrations.

=== Ohio ===
Major pride parades and festivals are held in cities across Ohio, with large-scale celebrations taking place in Cleveland, Columbus, Cincinnati, Toledo, and Akron. The largest gatherings occur during Pride Month in June, with additional regional events scheduled throughout the summer. Columbus Pride is the largest annual pride celebration in the state and the second largest in the Midwest. Cincinnati Pride, held on the last Saturday in June, has taken place since 1973 and draws more than 200,000 attendees annually. An estimated 300,000 people attended in 2026. Pride in the CLE is Cleveland's annual pride festival; 40,000 people attended in 2025.

Dayton has an annual pride festival amd parade. Additionally, the Pride Rocks! festival is "a day focused on LGBTQ+ suicide prevention, mental wellness, and community connection", held annually in Dayton since 2021. Attendees are encouraged to paint rocks with pride flags and messages of affirmation.

Ohio's pride celebrations have historically been concentrated in larger cities, but in recent years more rural areas, such as Darke County, Cuyahoga Falls, and Vermillion, have also held pride celebrations. Darke County held their first pride celebration in 2025, and Adams County held theirs in 2026. In Chillicothe, First Capital Pride was formed in 2019 and has held pride celebrations ever since. Organizers in Troy are also planning their first pride celebration as of June 2026.

=== Oklahoma ===
According to OKC Pride, the first pride event in Oklahoma City was a 1977 block party. OKC Pride held their first pride celebration event in 1987 and has since organized a march and festival, Pride on 39th, every year. Oklahoma PrideFest is held in Scissortail Park in Oklahoma City on the last weekend in June.

=== Oregon ===
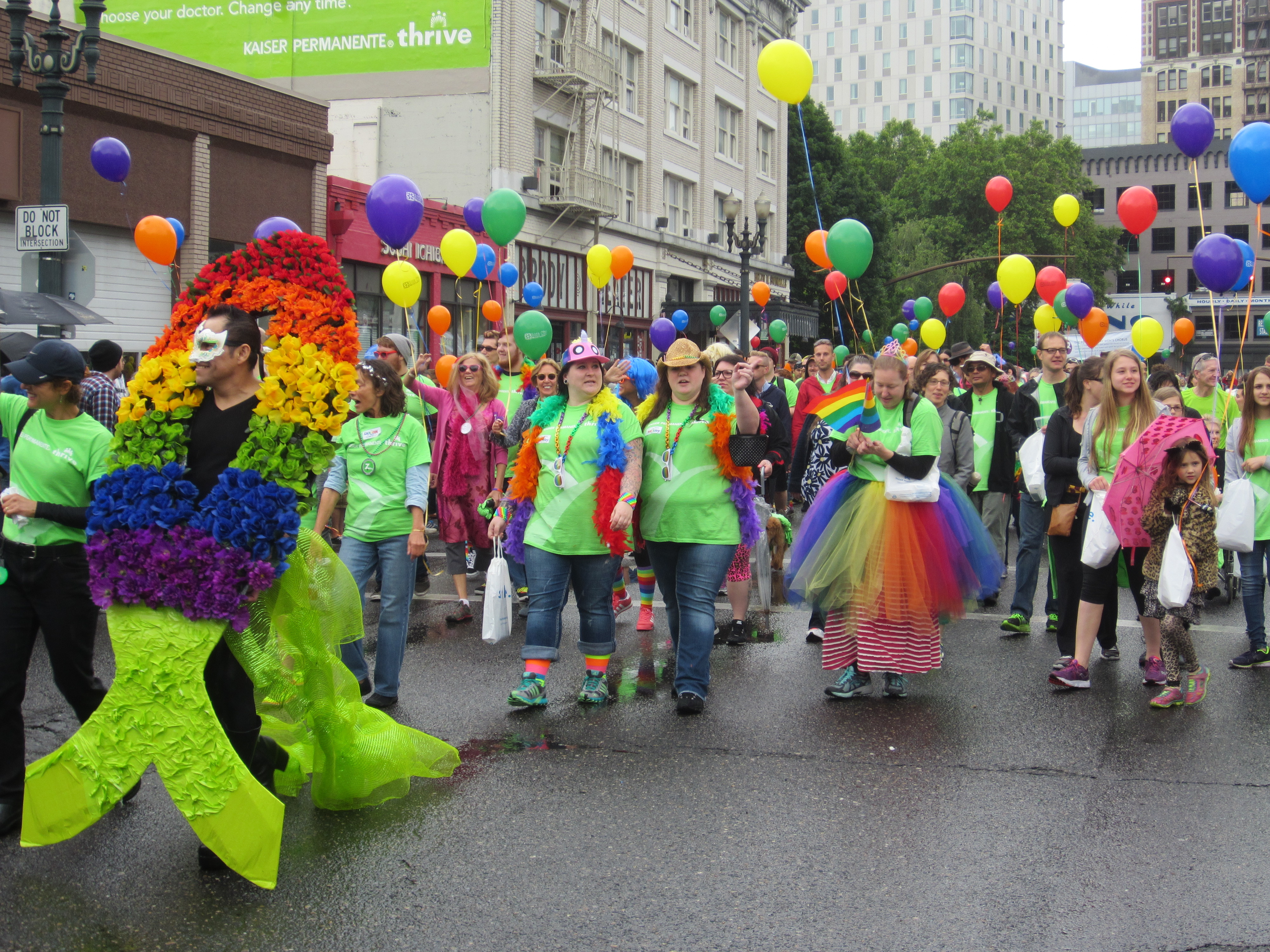
Portland Pride, 2014

The largest pride celebration in Oregon is the Portland Pride Waterfront Festival. Pride events have been held in Portland since 1976, and the nonprofit group Pride Northwest has been running the festival since 1994. It was historically celebrated in June, during pride month, but in 2023 organizers moved the date to July to avoid overlapping with the Delta Park Powwow and Juneteenth. Since 1994, Portland has had an annual Dyke March during the same weekend as the main pride parade.

Eugene Pride is held in August in Alton Baker Park. 12,000 people attended in 2024.

Salem Capital Pride holds a parade and block party in June, as well as Pride at the Park at Riverfront Park in September.

There have also been smaller pride celebrations across the state, including in Beaverton, Seaside, Monmouth, Albany, Pendleton, the Dalles, Astoria, and Roseburg.

There are a few regional LGBTQ events in Oregon. Central Oregon Pride is held in Bend and Southern Oregon Pride is held in Ashland. Oregon Coast Pride was held in Lincoln City but was discontinued in 2015. Southern Oregon Coast Pride has organized pride celebrations in Brookings and Coos Bay. Umpqua Valley Rainbow Collective puts on an annual festival in Douglas County.

=== Pennsylvania ===
Pennsylvania's largest pride marches are held in June in Philadelphia and Pittsburgh. Pride Festival of Central PA is held in July in Harrisburg. Additional pride celebrations are held throughout the summer in Bethlehem, Chambersburg, Doylestown, Elysburg, Erie, Gettysburg, Greensburg, Lancaster, Lititz, Media, Oil City, Phoenixville, Pottsville, Reading, Scranton, State College, Upper Darby, Wilkes-Barre, and York.

=== Puerto Rico ===
Puerto Rico has two major pride celebrations.

Boquerón Pride (Spanish: Orgullo Boquerón) is the largest annual pride celebration in Puerto Rico and one of the largest pride celebrations in the Caribbean, with up to 40,000 attending annually. It is celebrated in June and includes a pride parade and street festival in Boquerón, Cabo Rojo.

Pride Puerto Rico (Spanish: Parada de Orgullo LGBT de Puerto Rico) has been celebrated in San Juan since 1991. It also takes place in June.

=== Rhode Island ===
Rhode Island Pride has been held since 1976 in Providence. It is the largest Pride festival in the state of Rhode Island and includes an illuminated nighttime parade, block parties, and a festival area featuring vendors and live entertainment. Providence also hosts an annual Dyke and Trans People of Color March.

In 2020, during the COVID-19 pandemic, Rhode Island Pride reached out to eight Rhode Island municipalities to hold a virtual Pride flag raising, ensuring Rhode Island continued to celebrate Pride despite COVID-19 restrictions. The participating municipalities were Providence, Cranston, East Providence, Woonsocket, Warwick, Barrington, Pawtucket, Newport, and Central Falls.

The virtual flag raising faced significant opposition from local politicians in the city of Woonsocket, including then-mayor Lisa Baldelli-Hunt. The opposition to the 2020 virtual flag raising galvanized community organizers, including Rebuild Woonsocket and then-city council member Alex Kithes, to plan the inaugural Woonsocket Pride event. The event was planned for June 28, 2021. Despite applying for permits with adequate advance notice, the permit failed to be reviewed by Woonsocket's city council, leaving organizers without a permit. On June 24, 2021, then-mayor Badlelli-Hunt scheduled a last minute car show to take place on June 28, 2021, in the location where organizers had planned to hold Woonsocket Pride. In defiance, community members gathered at River Island Park to celebrate Pride with an unpermitted march from River Island Park to WWII Veteran's Memorial Park for Woonsocket's first Pride celebration.

Pride is celebrated in many other Rhode Island communities during the month of June, including Newport, East Providence, Barrington, Wakefield, Westerly, and North Kingstown.

Block Island Pride is celebrated annually in September; the first Block Island Pride took place in 2021.

=== South Carolina ===
The largest annual pride event In South Carolina is SC Pride, which has been held in Columbia since June 1990. It emerged from a 1989 protest and became an annual festival; 80,000 people attended in 2024.

Other pride celebrations are held in Bluffton, Charleston, Greenville, Myrtle Beach, North Charleston, and Rock Hill.

=== South Dakota ===
Sioux Falls Pride has been held in Sioux Falls since 2019. Around 10,000 people attend annually. Black Hills Pride is held in Rapid City. Watertown has held an annual pride festival since 2019. Additional pride events are held in Aberdeen, Brookings, and Pierre.

=== Tennessee ===
Nashville Pride, established in 1988, is the largest pride celebration in Tennessee. Knoxville also has a pride celebration, first held in 1991, and Memphis Pride Fest was first held in 1994. Memphis has also hosted the Tri-State Black Pride celebration since 2016. Other pride celebrations have been held in Franklin, Murfreesboro, and Jackson.

=== Texas ===
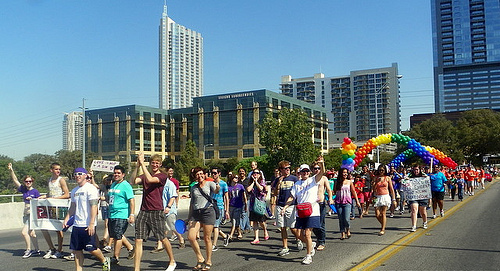
Austin Pride, 2011

Pride Houston, established in 1979, is the largest pride celebration in Texas, held in Houston during the month of June. Houston has also held the Black Like That Community Festival, which focuses on the Black LGBTQ community, since 2021.

The Austin Pride Parade is an annual pride celebration held in Austin in August with several events leading up to and following the official parade day.

The Dallas Pride Festival of Rainbows is held annually in Dallas and in 2026 it was moved from local Fair Park to the downtown Dallas area. Originally held in "Oak Lawn neighborhood, the historic heart of Dallas’s LGBTQ+ community", this celebration of the LGBTQ community has been observed in Dallas in various forms since before 1982. Dallas Southern Black Pride is celebrated in June. Pride in Bloom is held at the Dallas Arboretum.

Trinity Pride Fest happens in Fort Worth in June.

=== U.S. Virgin Islands ===
In the United States Virgin Islands, the largest pride celebration is the St. Croix Pride Parade. in Frederiksted. The first St. Croix Pride Parade was held in Frederiksted in 2018, and since then it has been held alternately in Frederiksted and Christiansted. The Cruzan Cowgirls ride on horseback in the parade. There are also rave parties, brunches, bar crawls, drag parties, and other events throughout pride month.

=== Utah ===
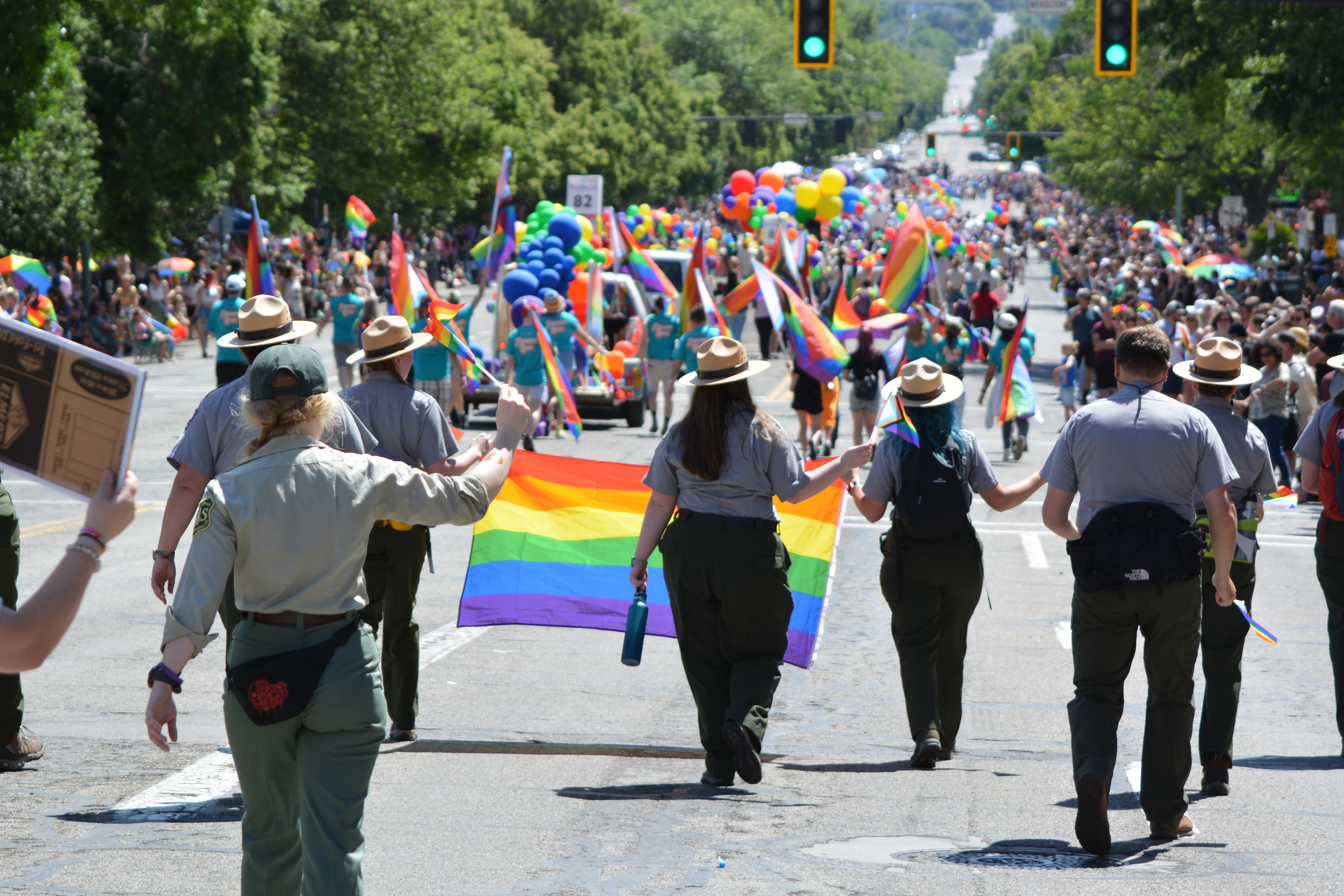
Salt Lake City Pride, 2023

Utah's primary pride parade is the annual Utah Pride Festival, held in Salt Lake City during the month of June. The first Utah Pride March, considered to be the first instance of the modern Utah Pride Festival, was staged in 1990 after more than a decade of LGBTQ organizing. Since 2023, Salt Lake City has also hosted SLC Pride, an annual "grassroots" parade. Other Utah cities that have held pride celebrations include Provo and Brigham City.

=== Vermont ===
Vermont's pride celebrations are held in Bennington, Milton, Essex, Montpelier, Barre, St. Albans, Newport, Morrisville, and Rutland County.

=== Virginia ===
Virginia's largest pride celebration is the Hampton Roads PrideFest, containing many live performances as well as the Pride Boat Parade. An additional follow-up celebration, Hampton Roads Pride at the Beach, is held at Virginia Beach's oceanfront. For regional celebrations, there exist the Richmond Pride event in Central Virginia, and the Roanoke Pride event in Southwest Virginia. Black Pride RVA has been held in Richmond since 2018. Other pride celebrations are held in Alexandria, Penrose, Fairfax County, Leesburg, and Woodbridge.

=== Washington (state) ===
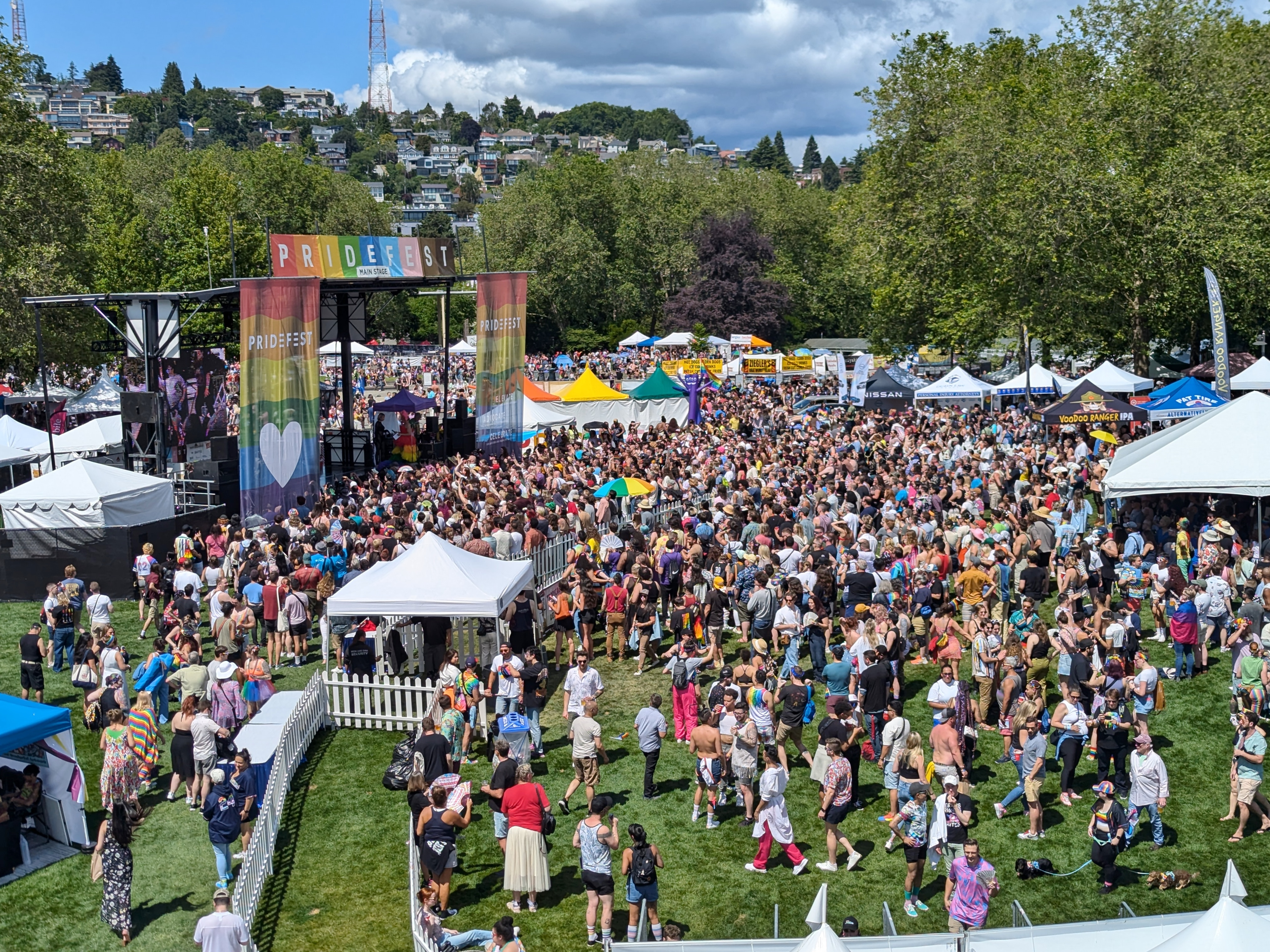
Seattle Pride Fest 2024

Seattle Pride is the largest pride celebration in the state of Washington, as well as the largest parade in Seattle, with hundreds of thousanda of attendants every year. It was established and recognized by the city in 1974. Seattle also has a Trans Pride event and drag brunches.

Other pride celebrations are held in cities throughout the state, such as Bellingham, Tacoma, Spokane, and Yakima. Vancouver hosts an annual pride celebration called Saturday in the Park.

=== Washington, D.C. ===
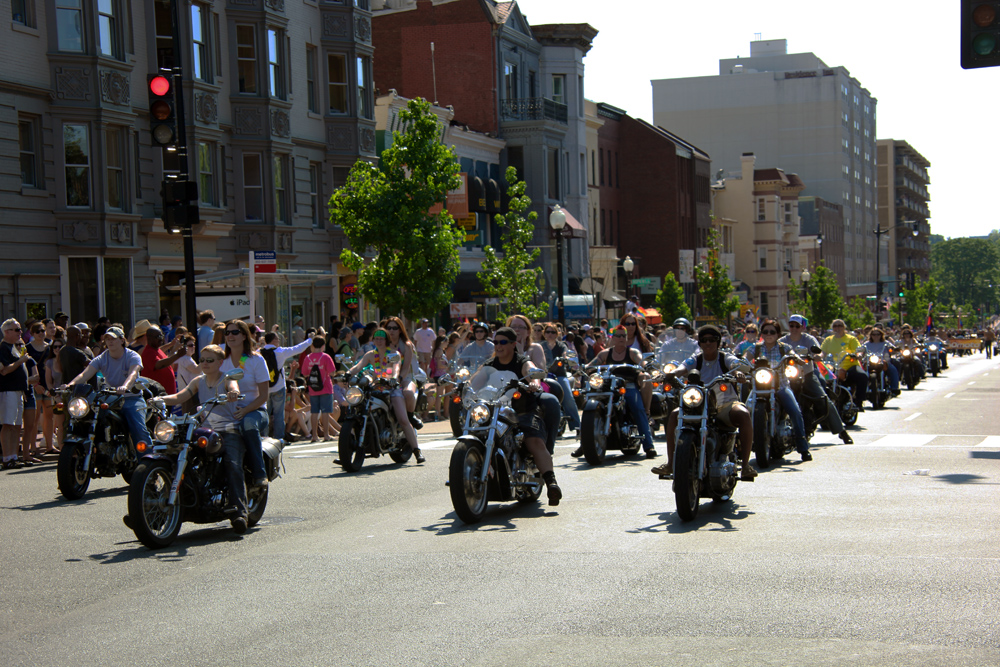
Dykes on Bikes at Capital Pride in Washington, D.C., 2012

The first pride celebration in Washington, D.C. was held on June 22, 1975. The event was planned by Deacon Maccubbin and took place in front of the Lambda Rising bookstore that he founded as well as in the adjacent Dupont Circle.

Lafayette Square in front of the White House has been an important site for LGBTQ protests and demonstrations since before Washington, D.C. held any pride celebrations. In 1979, it was the site of the first National March on Washington for Lesbian and Gay Rights, and subsequent LGBTQ marches were held there in 1987, 1993, and 2000. In June 2009, President Barack Obama hosted the first-ever pride month reception in the East Room of the White House, a practice that continued until the end of his second term. On June 26, 2015, the Supreme Court legalized same-sex marriage in the United States with its decision on the Obergefell v. Hodges case. The decision was followed by celebrations across the U.S., including a celebration in Lafayette Square, during which the White House was lit with the colors of the rainbow pride flag. President Donald Trump took office in 2017, and official pride celebrations at the White House stopped until the end of his first presidency. The White House returned to its pride month celebrations and proclamations in 2021, during Joe Biden's presidency, but ended these practices again during Trump's second presidency, beginning in 2025.

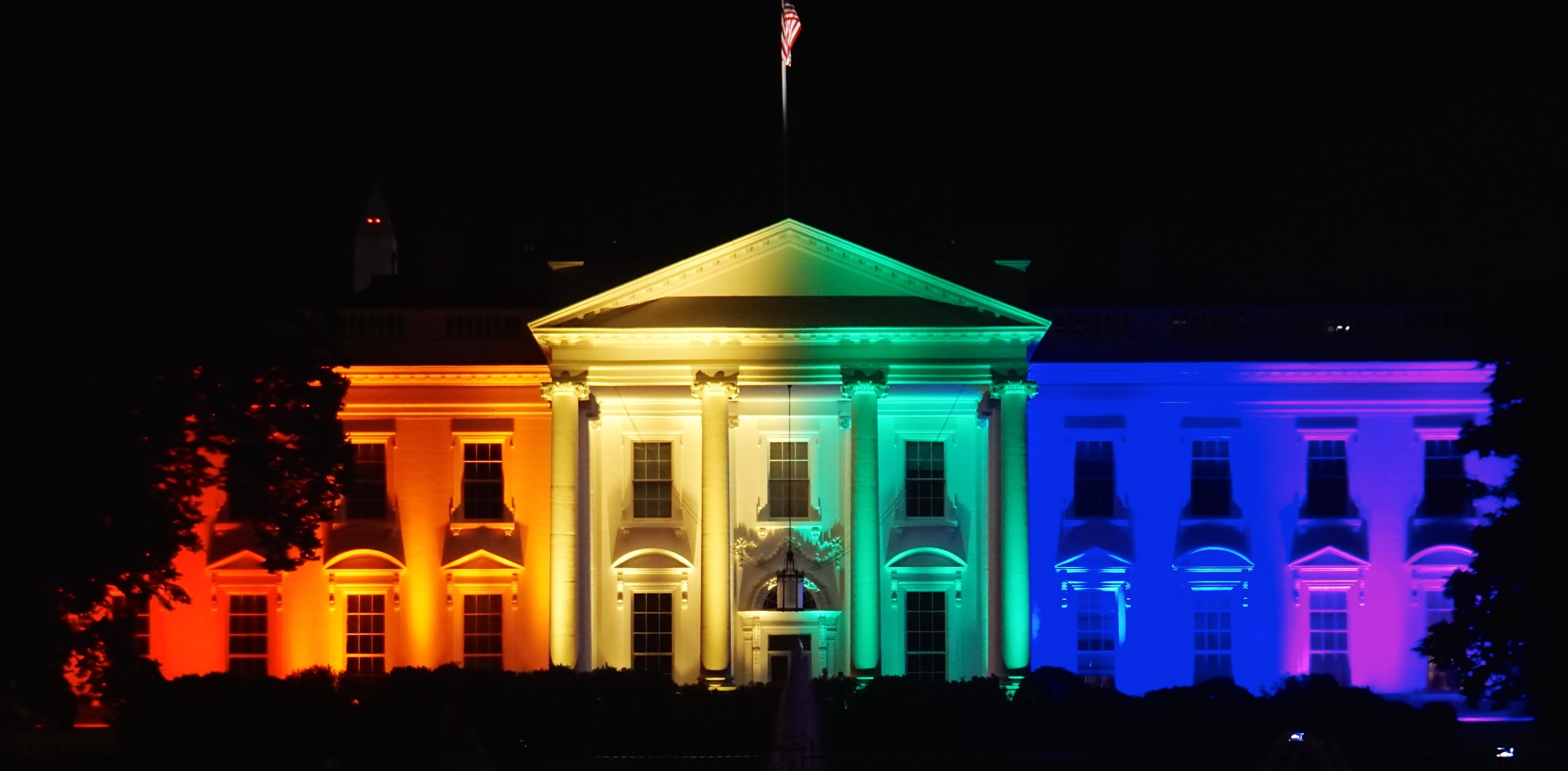
The White House during the Obergefell v. Hodges celebration

Today, Capital Pride includes a festival and a pride parade held during a weekend in June. It is one of the largest pride celebrations on the east coast of the United States, and is generally attended by over 500,000 people each year. Historically, the parade passed Dupont Circle, where the first celebrations were held; however, starting in 2024, the parade began to avoid Dupont Circle, and the festival was held along Pennsylvania Avenue. Washington, D.C. was the site of WorldPride in 2025.

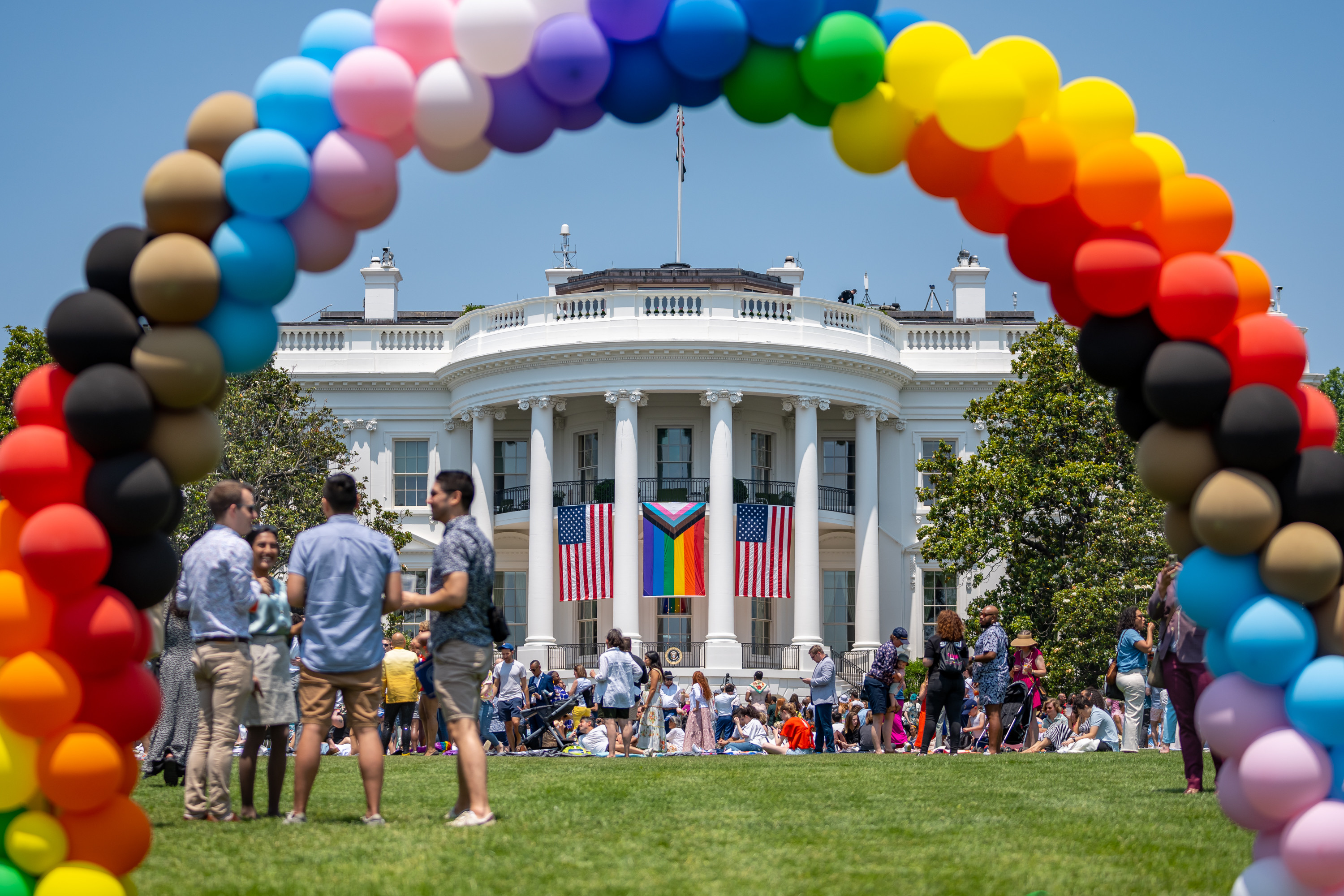
Pride celebration on the White House lawn, 2023

Beyond the annual festival and parade, pride celebrations in Washington, D.C. include many events spread throughout pride month. Pride on the Pier is an annual pride celebration held in June in The Wharf, organized by the news organization Washington Blade. Team D.C. organizes pride nights with teams such as the Washington Capitals and the Washington Nationals. D.C. Latinx Pride plans pride events for the LGBTQ Latino community, including an annual party and a display in the Capital Pride Parade. Front Runners DC holds an annual Pride Run 5k at the Congressional Cemetery.

Celebrations outside of pride month include the High Heel Drag Queen Race (since 1986) and events in March centered around Trans Day of Visibility. D.C. Black Pride is held on Memorial Day as a gathering for, and celebration of, the Black LGBTQ community. It was founded in 1991 and was the first Black Pride event in the U.S. Trans Capital Pride also takes place in May. Mid-Atlantic Leather Weekend is held in Washington, D.C. in January.

=== West Virginia ===
In Charleston, there are several pride events in June. Charleston Pride has been held there since 2004.

The first Parkersburg Pride Fest was held in Parkersburg's City Park in 2018. In 2020 it was held virtually due to the COVID-19 pandemic, but every year before and since it has been an in-person event. Over 5,000 people attended in 2026.

Beckley Pride was first held in June 2019.

Berkeley Springs has held a pride picnic every June since 2021.

Shepherdstown held their first pride parade in 2025.

Other places in West Virginia that hold pride celebrations include Elkins, Fairmont, Lost City, Martinsburg, Morgantown, and Ronceverte.

=== Wisconsin ===
Milwaukee hosts PrideFest Milwaukee annually. Madison has historically hosted pride picnics, including Madison Pride and MAGIC Picnic, which began in the 1970s and was held annually until at least sometime in the 2000s.

=== Wyoming ===
The Pride Cheyenne Street Fest has been held in Cheyenne since 2023.

Wyoming Equality has put on various pride celebrations in Cheyenne since 2017, including annual pride festivals and a puppy pageant that has been held since 2024 in partnership with the Cheyenne Animal Shelter.

Other pride events are held in Jackson, Casper, and Laramie.

== See also ==
- LGBTQ people in the United States
- List of festivals in the United States
- List of largest LGBTQ events
- Annual Reminder
