= Southern Fried Queer Pride =

Atlanta-based non-profit organization

Southern Fried Queer Pride (SFQP) is an Atlanta-based non-profit which works to center and empower Black queer and QTPOC communities in the South through the arts. Taylor Alxndr and Micky B co-founded the organization in 2014 to create a space for Black and brown queer folks in Atlanta. SFQP hosts 40 to 60 events each year, including festivals, drag shows, and community discussions. The organization also publishes its own zine, Kudzu, (Note: Named after kudzu.) and organizes art projects like the SFQP Bites video series.

== History ==
Founders Taylor Alxndr and Micky B created SFQP in 2014. Alxndr said the organization was founded out of frustration, as Atlanta lacked a space for queer and trans people of color, youth, artists and poor folks. They started throwing house parties, and began planning for a festival in 2015 that would focus on queer and trans people of color. They recruited other local organizers and artists to help them plan events. Early on, they established their signature organizational structure, known as "chefs," who work together to bring the ideas of the community to fruition. SFQP incorporates other food imagery through, for example, “SFQP Bites” events, the “Peach Pit” pageant, and the Southern Fried Queer Pride name. The food theme draws on the rich tradition of home-cooked food in Southern culture, and especially in Black Southern culture. SFQP threw their first festival with a $1,500 budget, which they raised through three house parties. Gradually, their funding began to increase and they moved to throwing parties at bars and working with DIY venues that share their vision. As of March 2021, they have been throwing their annual festival at the end of June in Atlanta for six years.

=== Historical Influences ===
SFQP organizers link their work to a long history of Black and brown trans and queer resistance.

The Southeastern region of the United States is often equated to antiquity, white supremacy, and conservative values more generally. The work by SFQP challenges this narrative by calling upon the rich history of resistance by queer black and brown people in the south. Taylor Alxndr emphasizes that SFQP is "resisting the narrative that being a queer in the south is an unbearable existence, that we don't have any safe communities, that it's just dangerous for us to be here, that we don't have like a history, but I think [that's] partially due to ignorance by media and just the perpetuation of the false narrative. We have so much history."

== Events ==
SFQP holds a wide variety of events, from large festivals and live performances like the Atlanta is Burning Ball, as well as community workshops on artist skills like Adobe Illustrator. They generally host 40 to 60 events per year.

SFQP organizes a five-day-long Southern Fried Queer Pride Festival during the last week of June each year. The festival seeks to provides a safe space for queer and trans+ folks of color in Atlanta to celebrate pride month. Past festivals have held events all day at DIY Atlanta venues like The Bakery and Mammal Gallery. 2018 and 2019 festival events included gallery shows featuring art by local queer artists, a queer variety show called "Sweet Tea", a tea dance open to all ages, an 18+ dance party, variety shows, artist markets, workshops and skillshares. The organization recently expanded the festival to Durham, North Carolina.

=== Atlanta is Burning ball ===
The Atlanta is Burning ball was completed in collaboration with Red Bull and Morph, "a local Atlanta, queer PoC ran nightlife event founded by Jsport and Leonce". To date, the event is one of the only partnerships SFQP has made with large corporations. As a policy, SFQP refuses to collaborate with corporations if they require micromanagement from the sponsors or a compromise in the artistic vision. The Atlanta is Burning ball was an eye-to-eye collaboration, with queer artists and representatives from the company immersing themselves into the community and ballroom culture. Everyone represented in the event, from the organizers to the performers and judges, came from the ballroom community, and were compensated for their work.

=== Night Life ===
Besides their annual festivals, SFQP holds many dance parties and nightlife events throughout the year. Black and brown trans people are often excluded in the Atlanta nightlife scene, and SFQP provides alternatives to such venues. The organization is highly selective with the bars with which they collaborate, opting for spaces that allow for artistic and creative control as well as safe spaces for trans people. SFQP is careful in choosing the staff for their events, including bartenders and door attendants. Nightlife can often be a transphobic space in which pronouns are not respected, nor the presence of Black and brown people. SFQP aims to combat such culture through their reputation as a radically inclusive space willing to perpetually evolve with the times.

=== COVID-19 pandemic ===
In 2020 and 2021, during the COVID-19 pandemic, SFQP turned their focus to online events. Virtual events, like online workshops, film screenings, discussions, and dance parties, were held over Zoom. Virtual events expanded SFQP's reach to community members who would not have been to attend in-person SFQP events in past years, such as rural and home-bound Southern queer people. Additionally, though the organization has always dabbled in mutual aid, they increased their emphasis on such work during the pandemic.

== Future plans ==
DIY venues like Mammal Gallery and the Bakery, which SFQP used as event spaces when they first started organizing, have since closed due to the COVID-19 pandemic and rising property taxes in Atlanta. Trends show that artists are often some of the first to lose their spaces due to gentrification. Artists bring people together in low-income areas at accessible venues, which are then quickly gentrified due to their popularity. Taylor explains that "every time artists here in the city would flock to a venue, a year or two later, it would be bought out, shut down, and turned into condos. It’s the life cycle of artists and gentrification."

SFQP is currently in the process of fundraising to buy a building to serve as a queer community space in Atlanta. In addition to improving the organization's stability, having a space of their own will enable SFQP to host events without alcohol, which is not always possible at bars that are looking to increase their own profits through alcohol sales.

== See also ==
- Atlanta Black Pride
- Culture of Atlanta
- Pride celebrations in the United States
