= PrideFest (Denver) =

LGBTQ pride event in Denver, Colorado, U.S.

Coordinates: 39°44′22″N 104°59′20″W

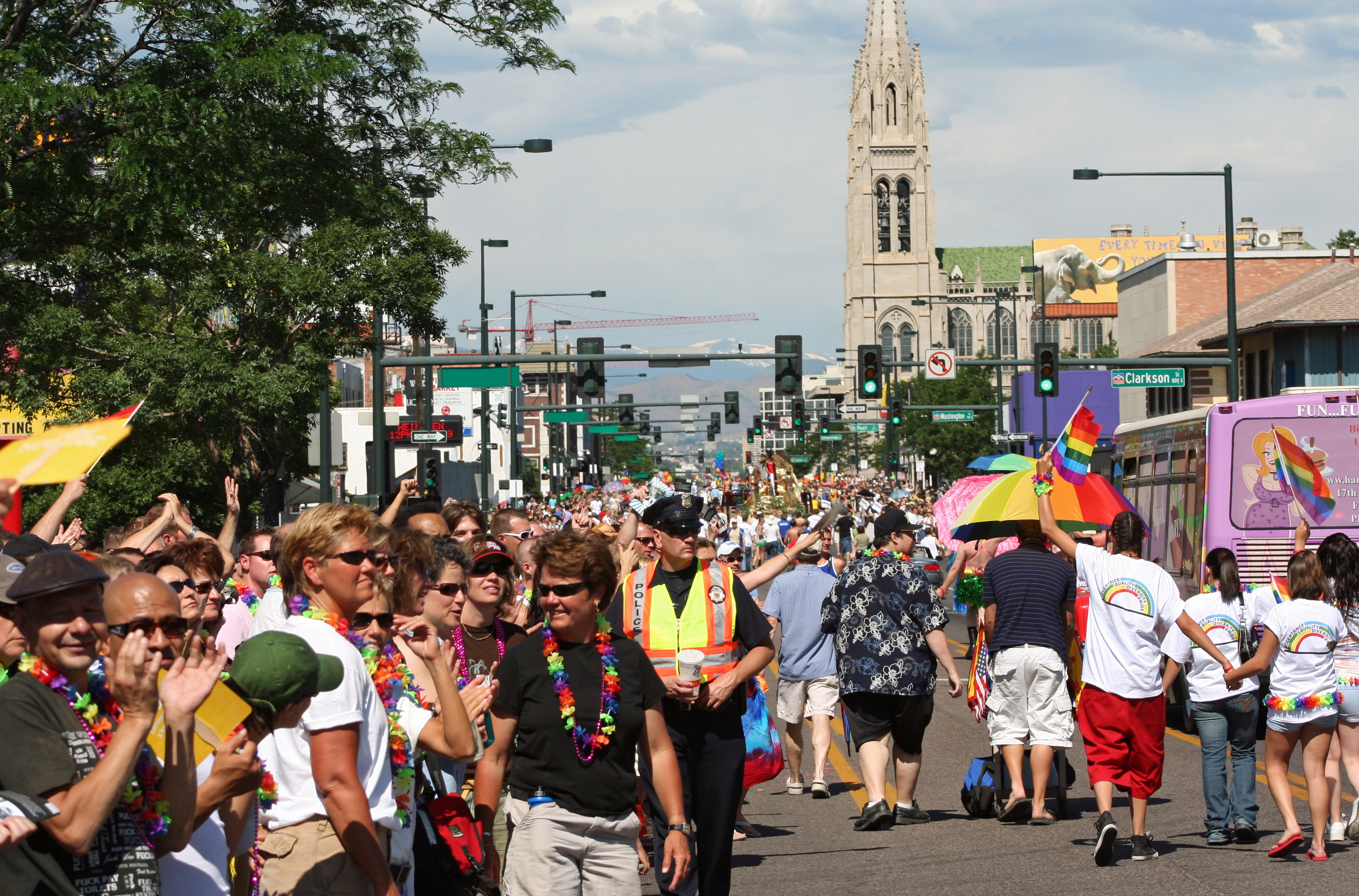
- A view of the PrideFest celebration on East Colfax Avenue in Denver in 2008
- Status: Active
- Genre: Pride parade
- Locations: Denver, Colorado
- Years active: 50
- Inaugurated: 1976

PrideFest is an annual gay pride event held each June in Denver, honoring the culture and heritage of the lesbian, gay, bisexual, and transgender community in the State of Colorado. The first "Pride" event in Denver, known as Gay Pride Week, took place June, 1974 and included a "gay-in" in Cheesman Park attended by about fifty people. The first Gay Pride Parade took place in 1975 with approximately 200 people marching along sidewalks to the Civic Center Park unaware that they needed a permit. The first event resembling the present day Denver PrideFest occurred in 1976, the same year the local community center, now known as the Center on Colfax, was founded. The Center organizes and produces the festival and parade each year. The event currently consists of a two-day festival at Civic Center Park, the Pride 5K, and culminates with a parade along Colfax Avenue. Denver PrideFest now draws 525,000 guests annually, making it the third largest pride festival and seventh largest pride parade in the United States.

== Overview ==
PrideFest generally occurs on the third weekend of June. Celebrations at local establishments begin the week of PrideFest, with a conclusion of the entire celebration the following Sunday. A stretch of Colfax Avenue is closed for the Sunday parade, from Franklin Street west to Broadway. After the parade, the roads surrounding Civic Center Park (Broadway, the "Colfax Curve", Bannock, and 14th Avenue Parkway) remain closed during the rally and street fair. Vendors sell a variety of products such as homemade jewelry, stained glass, apparel, food, and services. Several companies and organizations also rent booths to show their support for Denver's and Colorado's LGBT community. Local and nationally recognized performers offer entertainment at multiple stages during the event. The festival comes to a close in the early evening. Roads are reopened about an hour after cleanup.

== Parade ==
Parade route, shown in red

The PrideFest parade generally begins at 9:30am. Floats are built by various companies and organizations that support LGBT rights. The parade staging location is at Cheesman Park in Denver's gay village, the Capitol Hill neighborhood. The parade goes north two blocks to Colfax Avenue, then west toward downtown for about a mile, ending at Civic Center Park at Broadway and Colfax.

== Attendees and constituents ==
Denver PrideFest parade 2023

Denver's PrideFest has historically been host to many media and political agents who support the LGBT community. Some notable past attendees:

- Former Colorado Governor and Denver Mayor John Hickenlooper (Hickenlooper also officially endorses the festival and marches every year)
- Former Denver Mayor Wellington Webb
- Radio DJ Jamie White (non-local)
- Radio DJ's "Larry Ulibarri, Kendall and Kathy" from KS107.5
- Denver City Council members
- Tiffany, American singer
- Denver Gay Men's Chorus
- Dear Marsha
- Tracy Edwards
- Daniel Lucio
- RoyalRush Dance Troupe
- Nicole Torres and the Affiliates
- Mile High Freedom Band

== See also ==
- History of Denver
- Pride celebrations in the United States
