= Frontrunners =

Organization

International Front Runners
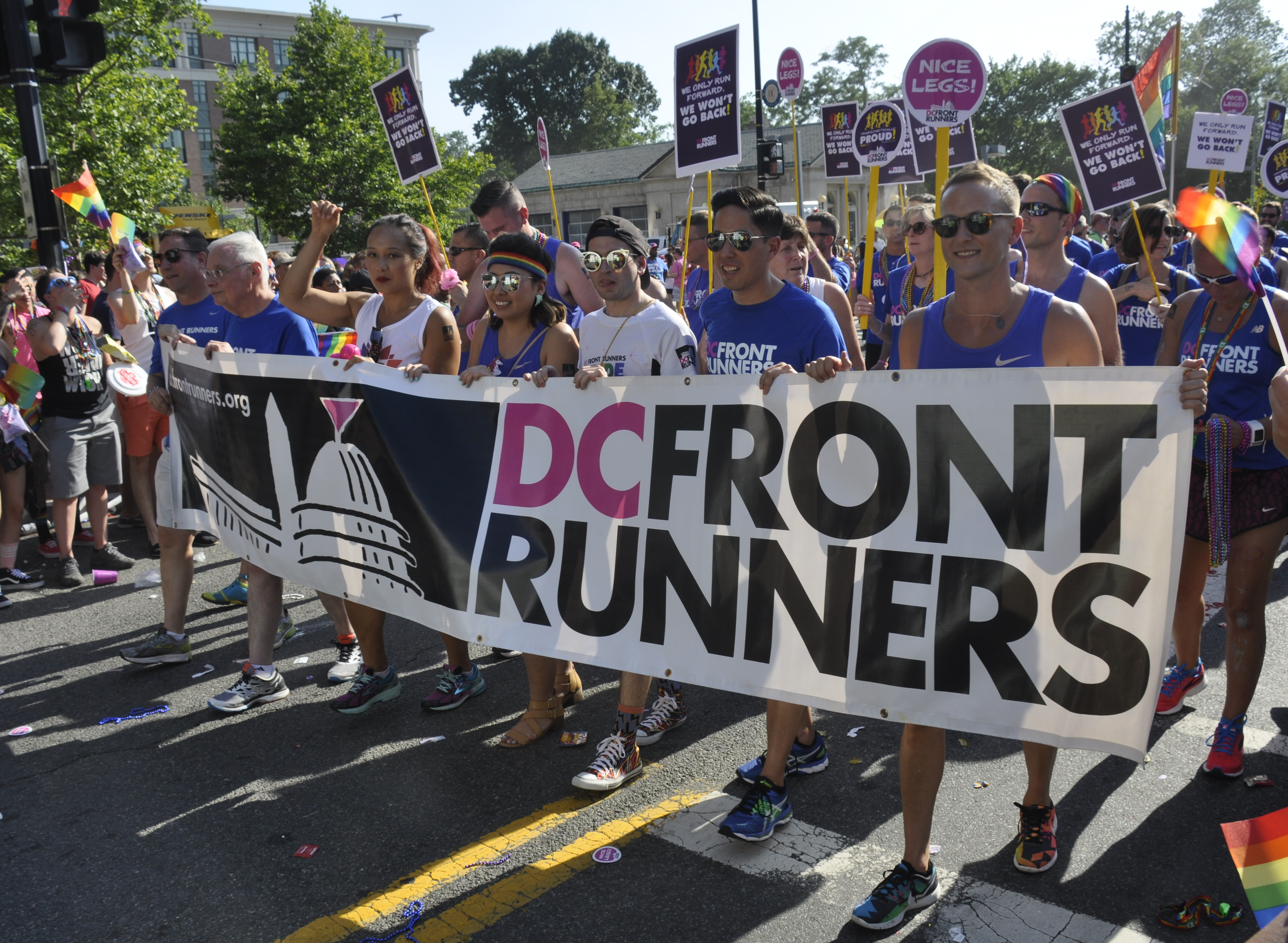
- DC Frontrunner in 2017 Capital Pride parade
- Website: www.frontrunners.org

International Front Runners (Frontrunners) is an umbrella organization of LGBTQ running and walking clubs around the world. The walking clubs are called Frontwalkers.

== Activities ==
Most Front Runners clubs host one or more weekly fun runs. Following a 30-year tradition, members typically gather afterwards at a local restaurant.

Many of the larger clubs host social events such as potluck dinners and annual banquets; participate as a team in distance relays and international LGBT sporting events such as Gay Games, World Outgames, and EuroGames; and elect officers, have bylaws and a membership-dues structure.

A growing interest in walking has led some Front Runners clubs to add "Frontwalkers" to their club name. For example, Frontrunners & Walkers (Ft. Lauderdale) and Frontrunners & Briskwalkers (Cork).

== Name variation ==
There are four different spellings of the organization name: Front Runners, FrontRunners, Frontrunners, and the infrequently used frontRunners.

== History ==
The first FrontRunners club was formed in San Francisco in January, 1974 by Jack Baker and Gardner Pond. It started as an "introduction to jogging" group listed in the bimonthly publication of "Lavender U", which was organized to serve the gay and lesbian community. "Classes" such as creative writing, ballroom dancing, learning to play bridge, etc., were listed. Jack and Gardner were members of San Francisco's DSE Running Club and modeled the Lavender U Joggers after it. The group met every Sunday at 10AM at a different scenic location. In 1978, Lavender U ceased to exist and the then-leader of the Lavender U Joggers, Bud Budlong, held a series of reorganization meetings that resulted in the group renaming itself "FrontRunners." The new name was inspired by Patricia Nell Warren's 1974 novel The Front Runner, about a gay track coach and a gay runner. Bylaws were written, dues were established, and the first election of officers was held in January, 1979. Several years later, the group changed its weekly run to Saturday at 9 AM at Stowe Lake in Golden Gate Park.

The second FrontRunners club was formed in 1979 when Malcolm Robinson, a runner and employee of New York Road Runners, organized a gay running club and modeled it after the FrontRunners. He called it Front Runners New York. Soon after, the Los Angeles Front Runners was formed. After the first Gay Games, held in San Francisco in 1982, many Front Runners clubs were organized throughout the United States and around the world.

Patricia Nell Warren, known as "Patches" to her Los Angeles Front Runners family, frequented the Los Angeles runs and annual dinners held by the LA group and participated in the annual Christopher Street West parade as part of the LA Front Runners contingent during the 1990s, thanks to then-president Marty Freedman and then-executive board member Kevin and Don Norte.

The International Front Runners was created and became a more formal body by drafting and adopting a mission statement and constitution at the Front Runners International Front Runner Forum in 1999.

== Clubs around the world ==
There are over 100 Front Runners clubs worldwide, about half of which are in the United States. The International Front Runners website maintains a visual directory.

=== United States and Canada ===
- Atlanta - Front Runners Atlanta https://frontrunnersatlanta.org
- Calgary Front Runners in Calgary AB Canada (originally named Alpine Front Runners Club Calgary) running Saturdays @ 9 AM and Wednesdays @ 5:30 PM from the south end of the peace bridge 3 seasons (except winter) and in winter same times from Cafe Gravity Eau Claire location 240 Riverfront Ave. SW.
- Chicago Frontrunners and Frontwalkers, inducted into the Chicago Gay and Lesbian Hall of Fame in 1995.
- Colorado Front Runners, runs in Denver, Boulder, and the foothills.
- DC Front Runners, since 1981
- Frontrunners Rhode Island https://www.frontrunnersri.com/
- Houston Front Runners
- Los Angeles
- Nashville Frontrunners, formed in 2016, is an LGBTQ+ running club based in Nashville, Tennessee.
- Front Runners New York, NYC’s LGBT running club. Founded 1979, affiliated with New York Road Runners (NYRR), and member club of Road Runners Club of America.
- Philadelphia Frontrunners, since 1983
- San Francisco Front Runners, since 1974, LGBT Running and Walking Club Welcoming Everyone of All Abilities!
- Seattle Frontrunners, since 1985
- Toronto - Front Runners Toronto, since 1987
- Vancouver (BC) Frontrunners formed in 1983 and sponsor of the annual (July) Vancouver Pride Run & Walk.
- Long Beach Shoreline Frontrunners formed in 1984.
- Portland, Oregon Frontrunners formed in 1982.

=== Europe ===
- Aberdeen Frontrunners: founded in 2019, inclusive LGBT+ running club based in Aberdeen, Scotland. Affiliated with JogScotland and LEAP Sports Scotland.
- Aberystwyth Frontrunners: is an inclusive community group in mid-wales, holds weekly and ad-hoc runs, was founded in 2023
- Amsterdam - Dutch Gay and Lesbian Athletics a.k.a. Frontrunners Amsterdam
- Birmingham Swifts https://birminghamswifts.co.uk/ https://www.instagram.com/birminghamswifts/
- Brighton & Hove FrontRunners: Formed in 2018, holds an annual Rainbow Run 5k the day before Brighton Pride
- Belfast Frontrunners, since 2021. (Wednesdays & Sundays) https://www.instagram.com/belfastfrontrunners/
- Bristol Frontrunners
- Cologne
- Dublin Front Runners 'Running With Pride' since 2005
- Dundee Frontrunners
- Edinburgh Frontrunners
- Geneva FrontRunners
- Glasgow FrontRunners: an award-winning, inclusive community-based road-running group with strong links to Glasgow’s Lesbian, Gay, Bisexual and Transgender (LGBT) community and friends. Founded in 2010. Affiliated to Scottish Athletics and JogScotland
- Göteborg Frontrunners, since 2025
- Liverpool Frontrunners, was founded in 2015
- London Front Runners : a running club for gay, lesbian and transgender men and women and gay-friendly people who love running.
- Manchester Frontrunners : founded in 2005, a friendly LGBT running club who welcome all people of all abilities.
- Leeds Frontrunners: Founded in 2015, Leeds Front Runners is an inclusive community based running group with strong links to the LGBT community and their friends.
- Lyon
- Marseille : "Contre les discriminations, faisons du sport ensemble"
- Milan
- Newcastle Frontrunners, Formed in 2011 we welcome runners of all abilities, gender and sexual orientation. We annually hold our LGBT 5K on Newcastle upon Tyne's famous Town Moor.
- Nice – Front Runners Nice
- Nottingham Frontrunners https://www.instagram.com/nottsfrontrunners/
- Paris Front Runners, since 1992
- Stockholm Frontrunners
- Zurich Frontrunners

=== Asia Pacific ===
- Sydney Front Runners, since 1983
- Adelaide Frontrunners, since 2021
- Brisbane Frontrunners and Walkers Group, since 1999
- Bengaluru Frontrunners, since 2021
- Melbourne Frontrunners
- Singapore Frontrunners
- Perth Frontrunners

== Famous Front Runners ==
- Actor George Takei met his husband Brad Altman during an LA Front Runners run in the 1980s.
- Dutch athlete Monique de Wilt had two personal records in the pole vault during the Gay Games in Amsterdam in 1998. She won the silver medal at the 1999 Summer Universiade. Only in 2005 both her Dutch national records (indoor and outdoor) were broken by Femke Pluim.
- The drag persona of Rupaul's Drag Race star Shuga Cain was born during the 2015 NYC Pride March, while marching as a member of Front Runners New York. A year later, she won the club's yearly Variety Hour. She started drag full time a year after that, then was chosen to be on the show's 11th season.

== See also ==
- Gay community
- Fédération sportive gaie et lesbienne
