= Atlanta Gay Center =

Former community center in Georgia, USA

The Atlanta Gay Center was a community center that served the gay community in Atlanta, Georgia (United States). It was founded in 1976. It has since closed and been replaced by the Atlanta Gay and Lesbian Community Center.

The center published a bi-weekly newspaper, and operated the Gay Helpline for the Atlanta area. The center was the meeting place for several support groups including those for teens, interracial couples, older couples, and P-FLAG.

During the early 1980s, in the early days of HIV/AIDS awareness, the Atlanta Gay Center offered free testing and support groups.

== See also ==
- List of LGBT community centers
