= Outoberfest =

LGBT festival in Jackson, Mississippi

OUToberfest
- Genre: LGBT festival
- Locations: Jackson, Mississippi, U.S.
- Founded: 2005
- Website: outoberfest.com

OUToberfest was a lesbian, gay, bisexual, and transsexual (LGBT) festival held annually during October in Jackson, Mississippi.

== History ==
It was established in 2005 for several reasons including:

- A failure of Mississippi Pride organizers in 2004
- An anti-gay constitutional amendment defining marriage in Mississippi
- A need for positive and non-political LGBT awareness in Mississippi
- A need for a stronger, more organized LGBT community in Mississippi

OUToberfest was initially conceptualized by Knol Aust, Duane Smith and Jenni Smith. Unity Mississippi was the official organizer of the event.

In 2012 it was announced that the festival would be renamed Mississippi Pride. However, it seems that the 2012 festival never came together.

== Entertainment ==
- OUToberfest 2007 Headlining Entertainers: Ultra Naté, Eric Himan, Bitch & The Exciting Conclusion, Sister Funk, Karen Ripley, DJ Knol, Kynt, and the MissiHippy Dancers.
- OUToberfest 2006 Headlining Entertainers: God-des & She, Eric Himan, Garrison Starr, Katastrophe, The Anna Byars Band, Dr. Madelyn Hatter, and the MissiHippy Dancers. The main event was hosted by Mindy Dawn Friedman.
- OUToberfest 2005 Headlining Entertainers: Bitch, Eric Himan, Jade Esteban Estrada, Pandora Scooter, The Anna Byars Band, Emily White, Richard Cortez, Dr. Madelyn Hatter, and the MissiHIPPY Dancers. The main event was hosted by Sklya Dawn Luckey.

=== Others ===
- 2007: Malcolm Rollick (acoustic folk), Emma Wynters (soul, jazz, folk), Midtown Dickens (indie folk duo), Will Myrick (folk), Jeff Lewis (indie pop), Kristy Ferguson (comedian), Jazmen Flowers (drag performer and Stevie Nicks tribute artist), Julie Mann (acoustic folk), SewL (spoken word)
