= Atlanta Black Pride =

Festival

- Inaugurated: 1996
- Attendance: 100,000 (est.)
- People: African-American LGBT community
- Website: atlblackpride.org

Atlanta Black Pride started in 1996 and is one of two officially recognized festivals for the African-American LGBT community. It is held in Atlanta each year at the end of August and beginning of September (week of Labor Day holiday). Atlanta Black Pride is historically the largest black gay pride convention and celebration in the world with an estimated 100,000 people annually in attendance. Atlanta Black Pride contributes to the annual $65 million economic impact on Atlanta's economy during the city's eventful Labor Day weekend most recently organized by The Dream Team, Angel X & Scrilla Ent due to the administration dissolve of In The Life Atlanta.

== ATL Winter Pride ==
January's Martin Luther King Jr. holiday weekend is when Atlanta's first major pride event of the year is held. During this unofficial pride weekend, there are several special black LGBTQ events and celebrations.

King's wife and Atlanta resident, Coretta Scott King, was a well-known supporter of basic LGBTQ rights. In 1998, Mrs. King publicly stated at the 25th Lambda Legal anniversary reception that she believes her late husband would have also been a supporter of LGBTQ rights.

== See also ==
- Atlanta Pride
- African Americans in Atlanta
- Atlanta Gay Center
- Ansley Mall
- Atlanta Gay Men's Chorus
- Ball culture
- Black mecca
- Cheshire Bridge Road
- J-Setting
- African-American LGBTQ community
