= Pride in the Desert =

Tucson LGBTQ pride event

Pride in the Desert is the annual LGBTQ pride event for Tucson, Arizona.

Similar to Phoenix Pride, Tucson does not hold a pride parade in the traditional month of June, due to high summer temperatures in Arizona.

== History ==
The history of gay pride events in Tucson began after the 1976 murder of Richard Heakin. Heakin, who lived in Nebraska, visited a friend in Tucson and was beaten to death by four teenagers while exiting a bar named Stonewall Tavern. The attackers were subsequently tried as juveniles, and sentenced to probation. At the time, hate crimes were often not punished at all. Heakin's murder became a motivation behind the foundation of Tucson Pride.

The first Tucson pride event, organized by an organization named Tucson Gay Coalition, was named the Gay Pride Festival & Memorial Picnic. It was held at Himmel Park on June 26, 1977, also the National Gay Pride Day that year.

In 1982, the Tucson Gay Pride Festival was cancelled amidst a statewide call to fight against LGBT discrimination and oppression, and the event was turned into a civil rights march from Tucson to Phoenix.

Since 1994, pride in Tucson is held in October.

In 2018, the parade, which was traditionally scheduled to take place on a Friday evening before the festival, was rescheduled to daytime hours, due to concerns within the LGBTQ+ community that holding a parade during the evening hours sends a bad message, as if the community is hiding in the shadows. In 2019, more than 5,000 people attended the event.

Over the years, Pride in the Desert has become a more family-centric theme.

Pride in the Desert became a virtual event for 2020, due to the COVID-19 pandemic. The event took place on October 24. The event returned in-person in 2022, which was also the event's 45th anniversary.
