= Out on the Mountain =

LGBT event at Six Flags Magic Mountain

- Founded: 2008
- Founder: Ray Rhodes, Out Ventures
- Headquarters: Valencia, CA, U.S.
- Website: OutontheMountain.com

Out on the Mountain is the annual lesbian, gay, bisexual, and transgender (LGBT) Pride event held at Six Flags Magic Mountain. Over 5,000 people attend this annual Southern California event of thrill rides and private LGBTQ party.

The 2026 event is scheduled for August 21, 2026 with performers April Carrión and Jessica Wild from RuPaul's Drag Race.

The 2025 event was held on August 22, 2025 with Kerri Colby from RuPaul's Drag Race and Bonnie McKee.

== History ==
Out on the Mountain is the creation of Six Flags Magic Mountain with Ray Rhodes and Out Ventures in 2008.

Past performers have included Tyler Glenn of the Neon Trees, Jessica Sutta of The Pussycat Dolls, Martha Wash (“It's Raining Men”), Jessica Sanchez (American Idol), Daniel Joseph Baker (America's Got Talent), RuPaul's Drag Race stars (Alaska, Chad Michaels, Trinity Taylor, Shangela, Aja, Raven, Courtney Act, Derrick Barry, Delta Work, Pandora Boxx, Ariel Versace, Mariah Balenciaga, Salina EsTitties,, Kerri Colby, Kylie Sonique Love and Luxx Noir London), and pop stars (Alexis Jordan, Maty Noyes, Natalia Kills, Kaya Stewart, Alice Chater, Bonnie McKee, and The Future X).

On its tenth anniversary, Out on the Mountain had Derrick Barry from RuPaul's Drag Race perform.

On its fifteenth anniversary, Out on the Mountain had Salina EsTitties perform and Delta Work host from RuPaul's Drag Race.

The 2024 event was held on August 16, 2024 with performers Kylie Sonique Love and Luxx Noir London from RuPaul's Drag Race and Alice Chater..
