= The Seduction of Kansas (song) =

Single by Priests

from the album The Seduction of Kansas
- Released: January 9, 2019
- Recorded: October–November 2018
- Genre: Dance punk; post-punk revival; art punk
- Length: 3:36
- Label: Sister Polygon
- Songwriters: Daniele Daniele; Katie Alice Greer; G.L. Jaguar; Taylor Mulitz
- Producer: John Congleton

Priests singles chronology
"Suck" (2018)	"The Seduction of Kansas" (2019)	"Good Time Charlie" (2019)

Music video
- "The Seduction of Kansas" on YouTube

"The Seduction of Kansas" is a song by the American punk rock band Priests. It is the title track from their second studio album, The Seduction of Kansas, and was released as a single on January 19, 2019.

== Background ==
The song is the self-titled lead single for their second studio album, and was released on January 9, 2019, nearly two years after their debut album, Nothing Feels Natural.

In an interview with Stereogum the band bickered about naming the title of the song. The lead singer Katie Alice Greer, when describing whether the song or title came first, said: "we didn't decide on the album until the 11th hour, when it was like, 'You guys have to pick a fucking title.' We were going through so many options". Other potential options for the song title included "All Hat, No Cattle" and "Horny For War, Horny For Sadness".

== Music video ==
Lead singer, Katie Alice Greer, directed the music video, which was released with the single on January 9, 2019. Marissa Lorusso, writing for NPR praised the music video saying it's a reminder of what makes the band's sharp, cerebral music so exciting".

== Critical reception ==
Writing for Consequence of Sound, Randall Coburn called the track "shinier and more synth-driven than much of their earlier work, but maintains an anxious undercurrent that pairs well with vocalist Katie Alice Greer's boundless energy and vibrant lyricism ('Bloodthirsty cherub choir/ from the cornfields you sing to me')."

Quinn Moreland in an interview with the band, and writing for Pitchfork, described the track as "a side of Priests that is frequently overshadowed by all the 'political punk' branding". Moreland described the song as more "pop sheen" to its sound.
