= Habit (EP) =

EP by Snail Mail
- Released: July 12, 2016
- Recorded: Spring 2016 (Washington, D.C.)
- Genre: Indie rock; shoegaze
- Length: 27:49
- Label: Sister Polygon
- Producer: Jason Sauvage; G.L. Jaguar

Snail Mail chronology
| Sticki (2015) | Habit (2016) | Lush (2018) |

Singles from Habit
- 1. "Thinning" Released: January 26, 2017

Habit is the debut extended play by American indie rock musician Snail Mail, originally released on July 12, 2016 through Sister Polygon Records and later reissued through Matador Records on August 30, 2019. Its only single, "Thinning", was released on January 26, 2017.

== Background and recording ==
Lindsey Jordan wrote the songs on Habit at age 15, and recounted the process as "all over the place and messy". She said she wrote the EP "almost hastily", believing it would not be heard by many people. She commented, "I wrote the songs about things that were so personal that I actually almost hoped nobody would [hear the songs]. I was like, ‘Uh oh, this girl is going to know it’s about her. This is deep, top secret.’"

The EP was recorded live. Jordan suffered from bronchitis throughout the entirety of the EP's recording process, which she said made tracking satisfactory vocal takes very difficult.

== Musical style ==
Jordan cited DC-area bands Priests and Flasher as influences on the sound on Habit.

== Critical reception ==
Professional ratings
Review scores
| Source | Rating |
|---|---|
| Pitchfork | 7.7/10 |
| AllMusic | 3.5/5 stars |
| Sputnikmusic | 3.5/5 |

In a review for Pitchfork, Quinn Moreland gave the album a score of 7.7/10. Moreland wrote that the album "wallows in uncertainty and transition – but their songwriting makes it feel both adolescent and eternal... Perhaps that is why Snail Mail sound so alive despite much tangible optimism: there's no person behind a curtain, the ugly resides in reality." The single "Thinning" also caught the attention of NM Mashurov of Pitchfork, who included the song on Pitchfork's "best new track" list, describing the song as "lo-fi dream-pop/garage, flat affect carried by fuzzy guitars, indie-pop melodies... 'Thinning' feels lush, like the momentary satisfaction of crawling back into bed when the outside world is too much."

== Track listing ==
All tracks are written by Lindsey Jordan, except where noted.

| No. | Title | Length |
|---|---|---|
| 1. | "Thinning" | 3:24 |
| 2. | "Habit" | 3:44 |
| 3. | "Static Buzz" | 5:17 |
| 4. | "Dirt" | 5:10 |
| 5. | "Slug" | 4:36 |
| 6. | "Stick" | 5:42 |

2019 Matador reissue:
| No. | Title | Writer(s) | Length |
|---|---|---|---|
| 7. | "The 2nd Most Beautiful Girl in the World" | Lois Maffeo, Pat Maley | 2:13 |

== Personnel ==
- Lindsey Jordan – guitar, vocals
- Shawn Durham – drums
- Ryan Vieira – bass
- Jason Sauvage – recording, production
- G.L. Jaguar – recording, production
- TJ Lipple – mastering
- Megan Schaller – artwork
- Taylor Mulitz – design, layout

2019 Matador reissue

- Ray Brown – drums (on "The 2nd Most Beautiful Girl in the World")
- Alex Bass – bass (on "The 2nd Most Beautiful Girl in the World")
- Jake Aron – production, mixing, engineering (on "The 2nd Most Beautiful Girl in the World")
- Dave Cooley – remastering
- Mike Zimmerman – design, layout
