= Katie Alice Greer =

American singer-songwriter

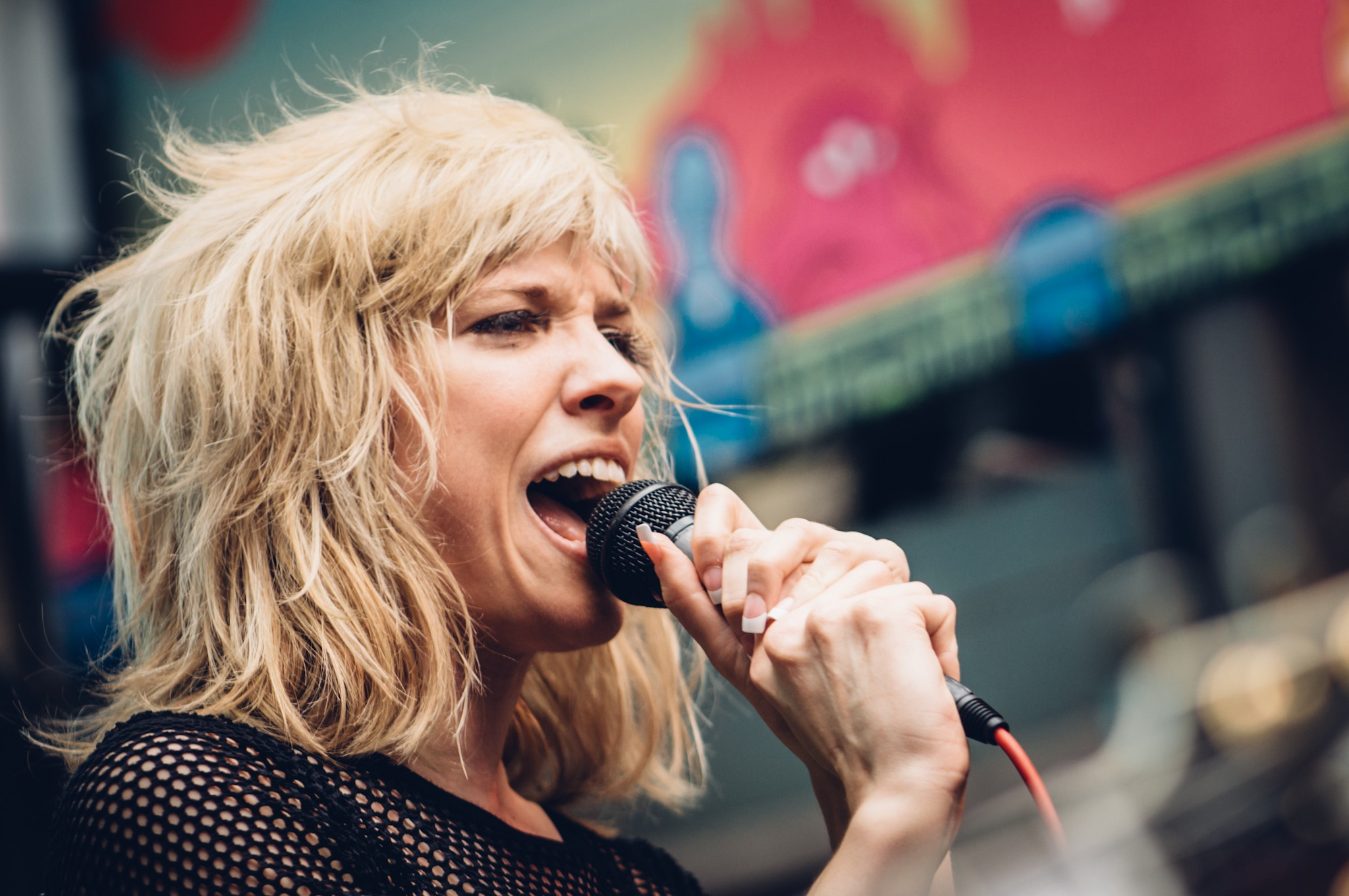
- Greer at SXSW 2019.

Background information
- Born: 1989 (age 36–37); Michigan, U.S.
- Genres: Post-punk; art-pop
- Occupations: Singer; songwriter; record producer; video director
- Instruments: Vocals; guitar; drums; synth
- Years active: 2012–present
- Labels: Sister Polygon; FourFour
- Website: katiealicegreer.com

Katie Alice Greer (born 1989) is an American artist, songwriter, performer and producer. She was the lead singer of Priests and released her first solo album in 2022.

== Biography ==
Greer was born in New Baltimore, Michigan. She moved to Washington, D.C., in 2006 to study at the American University, from which she graduated with a degree in political science.

In 2012 she formed the post-punk band Priests together with Daniele Daniele (drums), G.L. Jaguar (guitar) and Taylor Mulitz (bass), with herself on vocals. Their 2017 full length debut Nothing Feels Natural made several of that year's best album release lists. In 2019 Priests went on an indefinite hiatus.

Also in 2012, she and the other members of Priests founded the record label Sister Polygon Records, initially as a platform for the band's own releases. The label has since been home to a constellation of emerging acts from the DC, Maryland and Virginia area.

From 2012 to 2014 she also collaborated with Ian Svenonius as a vocalist on his project Chain & the Gang. Results from the collaboration were the two albums In Cool Blood (2012) and Minimum Rock N Roll (2014). She has also directed music videos, both for Priests and for other artists.

Greer has been releasing solo material since 2015, under her acronym KAG. Contrasting with Priests, her solo material has been described as more lo-fi art pop. In 2018 she released a full cover of the Dixie Chicks 1999 album Fly, the reason for this being on the one hand that she describes herself as a "huge Dixie Chicks fan", and, on the other that she wanted to get out of her creative comfort zone.

When Priests broke up in 2019, she moved to Los Angeles, just before the pandemic outbreak. During the pandemic she released a series of EPs and began work on her first full solo album.

In April 2022, Greer released Barbarism, a full length album which she wrote, performed, produced and mixed herself, noting that "Recording, for me, is like an instrument, and definitely the one I'm most proficient in". The album title alludes to "socialism or barbarism", a phrase used by Rosa Luxemburg. The album marks a strong break from the post-punk of Priests. One reviewer summarizes the album as "caught between reality and nightmare, balancing dissonant soundscapes against an eerie, self-possessed sense of calm" and concludes "Falling into her [Greer's] world, it's hard not to be possessed in return". Another reviewer describes it as "a wonderfully singular vision full of conviction, vulnerability, fear, fascination, and rage. The songs themselves feel like collages, layers of sound chopped up and glued together in ambiguous shapes." Rolling Stone writes "It's trippy, radical, weirdly life-affirming music, like nothing else Greer has ever made."

Discussing the many sources of inspiration for the album, Greer mentioned musicians including Erykah Badu, Karuna Khyal, Alex Prager, Hito Steyerl, and Julian Rosenfeldt.

Her album Perfect Woman Sound Machine, Vol. 1 was released on April 3, 2026.

As an artist, she has "cultivated a reputation as a dynamic performer and an astute conveyor of both abstract and didactic cultural critiques". The latter includes spoken and written commentaries, including essays and talks for NPR and the Future Of Music Policy Summit, among others, and often exploring "the politics of community… DIY, grassroots, based on mutual aid and solidarity".

== Discography ==
=== Albums ===
Fly by the Dixie Chicks (Album)

- Released: 2018

Barbarism (album)

- Released: 2022

Perfect Woman Sound Machine, Vol. 1 (album)

- Released: 2026

=== Extended plays ===
Fugue 7 (EP)

- Released: 2015

EP A (EP)

- Released: 2016

Danger Ahead b/w Turn to Stone (EP)

- Released: 2018

Freaky 57 (EP)

- Released: 2018

Play with Fire (cover) (EP)

- Released: 2020

41 Shots (Bruce Springsteen cover) (EP)

- Released: 2020

Wendi Deng (EP)

- Released: 2020

No One Else on Earth (EP)

- Released: 2020

3 Colors (EP)

- Released: 2020
