= Household Name (album) =

Studio album by Momma
- Released: July 1, 2022
- Studio: Studio G (Brooklyn)
- Length: 44:56
- Labels: Polyvinyl; Lucky Number Records
- Producer: Aron Kobayashi Ritch

Momma chronology
Two of Me (2020)	Household Name (2022)	Welcome to My Blue Sky (2025)

Singles from Household Name
- 1. "Medicine" Released: November 17, 2021; 2. "Rockstar" Released: February 22, 2022; 3. "Speeding 72" Released: April 19, 2022; 4. "Lucky" Released: May 25, 2022; 5. "Motorbike" Released: June 29, 2022

Household Name is the third studio album by American indie rock band Momma. It was released on July 1, 2022, by Polyvinyl and Lucky Number. The album was produced by Momma multi-instrumentalist Aron Kobayashi Ritch.

== Release and promotion ==
"Medicine", the album's first single, was released on November 17, 2021. The album's second single, "Rockstar", was released on February 22, 2022.

The band announced the album alongside the release of the third single, "Speeding 72", on April 19, 2022. Two more singles, "Lucky" and "Motorbike", preceded the album's release.

Followed by a brief tour of the UK in May 2022, Momma toured the United States during the summer supporting Snail Mail directly followed by a headline tour in the fall with support from waveform*, Pardoner and teethe to promote their album. They toured the United States supporting Surf Curse in November and December 2022. In 2023, they toured the United States with Death Cab For Cutie and Europe and the UK with Alex G.

== Musical style ==
Momma was influenced by alternative rock and grunge artists and bands from the 1990s while making this album, such as Liz Phair, Pavement, Nirvana, The Smashing Pumpkins and Veruca Salt. The band described their album as "the rise and fall of a rock star and the tropes and tribulations that come with the arc." and were inspired by relationships, the music industry's flaws, the archetype of a rock star and changes in their lives, such as breakups, while writing the album.

== Critical reception ==
Professional ratings
Aggregate scores
Source	Rating
AnyDecentMusic?	7.6/10
Metacritic	76/100
Review scores
Source	Rating
AllMusic	3/5 stars
Clash	8/10
DIY	4/5 stars
Gigwise	8/10 stars
God Is in the TV	9/10
Kerrang!	4/5
The Line of Best Fit	8/10
NME	4/5 stars
Pitchfork	7.2/10
Under the Radar	8/10 stars

Household Name was met with generally positive reviews. At Metacritic, which assigns a normalized rating out of 100 to reviews from mainstream publications, the album received an average score of 76, based on ten reviews. Aggregator AnyDecentMusic? gave it 7.6 out of 10, based on their assessment of the critical consensus.

Household Name was praised by critics upon its release for its sound reminiscent of 90's rock. The album appeared on several year-end lists in 2022.

Year-end lists
Publication	List	Rank	Ref.
The Forty-Five	The Best Albums of 2022	36	
Northern Transmissions	Best Albums of 2022	16	
Paste Magazine	The 50 Best Albums of 2022	28	
Under the Radar	Top 100 Albums of 2022	98	

== Track listing ==
All music is composed by Allegra Weingarten, Etta Friedman, Zach Capitti Fenton and Aron Kobayashi-Ritch.

Household Name track listing
No.	Title	Lyrics	Length
1.	"Rip Off"	Allegra Weingarten and Etta Friedman	3:49
2.	"Speeding 72"	Friedman, Weingarten and Aron Kobayashi Ritch	3:58
3.	"Medicine"	Friedman and Weingarten	4:14
4.	"Rockstar"	Friedman and Weingarten	3:09
5.	"Motorbike"	Weingarten	3:21
6.	"Tall Home"	Friedman	3:17
7.	"Lucky"	Friedman	4:03
8.	"Brave"	Weingarten	3:56
9.	"Callin Me"	Friedman	2:52
10.	"Spider"	Kobayashi Ritch	3:44
11.	"No Stage"	Weingarten	4:18
12.	"No Bite"	Friedman	4:11
Total length:			44:56

== Personnel ==
- Assistant engineer - Hayden Ticehurst
- Bass - Kevin Grimmet on all tracks except "Speeding 72"
- Cello - Dorothy Carlos
- Double bass - Sebastian Jones
- Drums, electric guitar and string arrangements by - Zach Capitti Fenton
- Lacquer cut by Chris Muth
- Mastered by Chris Allgood and Emily Lazar
- Photography - Daria Kobayashi Ritch
- Producer, mixed by, engineer, electric guitar, acoustic guitar, baritone guitar, percussion, string arrangements, drum programming, keyboards, sampler and ambience - Aron Kobayashi Ritch
- Vocals, backing vocals, electric guitar, acoustic guitar - Allegra Weingarten
- Vocals, bass on "Speeding 72", backing vocals, electric guitar, baritone guitar, piano, artwork, design - Etta Friedman
