= Ricochet (Snail Mail album) =

Studio album by Snail Mail
- Released: March 27, 2026
- Studio: Fidelitorium (Kernersville); Studio G (Greenpoint); The Nightfly (Bushwick)
- Length: 41:20
- Label: Matador
- Producer: Aron Kobayashi Ritch

Snail Mail chronology
Valentine (2021)	Ricochet (2026)

Singles from Ricochet
- 1. "Dead End" Released: January 20, 2026; 2. "My Maker" Released: February 18, 2026; 3. "Tractor Beam" Released: March 25, 2026

Ricochet is the third studio album by the American indie rock musician Snail Mail, released on March 27, 2026, by Matador Records.

The artwork was done by Momma frontwoman Etta Friedman.

== Background and recording ==
Jordan recounted the album's songwriting process to Guitar.com: "I spent probably four years trying to optimise my process. I worked super slowly, really trying to figure out what it was going to be. I was trying to write every day on tour, and I ended up putting together maybe nine of the 11 songs, including writing the vocal melodies before there was a single lyric."

The album was produced by Momma bassist Aron Kobayashi Ritch at Fidelitorium Recordings in North Carolina, which is owned by musical artist Mitch Easter. Jordan used a wide array of guitar amplifiers from Ritch's personal collection on the recording, including but not limited to a 1970s tweed Fender Princeton, a Twin Reverb, a Vox AC30 and an Orange combo amplifier.

== Music and lyrics ==
Some of the album's guitar work has drawn comparisons to Goo Goo Dolls. Jordan stated that the song "Agony Freak" was influenced by American indie rock band Pinback. The album's lyrical themes include uncertainty, time and insignificance.

== Critical reception ==
Professional ratings
Aggregate scores
Source	Rating
AnyDecentMusic?	7.2/10
Metacritic	71/100
Review scores
Source	Rating
AllMusic	3.5/5 stars
Beats Per Minute	80%
DIY	4/5 stars
Dork	4/5 stars
Hot Press	8/10
Paste	B+
Pitchfork	6.6/10
Record Collector	3/5 stars
Uncut	7/10
Under the Radar	8/10

According to the review aggregator Metacritic, Ricochet received "generally favorable reviews" based on a weighted average score of 71 out of 100 from fourteen critic scores. Elsewhere, the aggregator AnyDecentMusic? gave the album a weighted average of 7.2 out of 10 based on a sample of fourteen critical reviews.

== Track listing ==
All tracks are written by Lindsey Jordan.

Ricochet track listing
No.	Title	Length
1.	"Tractor Beam"	3:34
2.	"My Maker"	4:19
3.	"Light on Our Feet"	3:53
4.	"Cruise"	3:05
5.	"Agony Freak"	3:21
6.	"Dead End"	4:05
7.	"Butterfly"	3:34
8.	"Nowhere"	3:32
9.	"Hell"	3:47
10.	"Ricochet"	4:34
11.	"Reverie"	3:32

== Personnel ==
Credits adapted from the album's liner notes.

=== Musicians ===
- Lindsey Jordan – vocals, guitar, string arrangements (all tracks), Mellotron (track 2), piano (10)
- Alex Bass – bass (all tracks), Wurlitzer (8)
- Ray Brown – drums
- Aron Kobayashi Ritch – string arrangements, trumpet arrangements, guitar, sampling, slide guitar, ambience, bells, percussion, synthesizers, theremin, drum programming, organ, Optigan, Mellotron (all tracks); Wurlitzer (2–4, 8)
- Rohan Chander – string arrangements
- Metropolis Ensemble – strings (1–3, 10)
  - Andrew Cyr – artistic direction, conductor
  - Henry Wang – violin
  - Lydia Hong – viola
  - Cong Wu – viola
  - Jia Kim – cello
- Sebastian Owen Jones – double bass (3), piano (6, 7, 10), Wurlitzer (11)
- Nicole Davis – trumpet (4)

=== Technical and design ===
- Aron Kobayashi Ritch – production, engineering, mixing
- Alex Bass – additional production
- Hayden Ticehurst – engineering assistance
- Tanner Wallace – engineering assistance
- Mitch Easter – additional vocal engineering
- Matt Colton – mastering
- Etta Friedman – album art, design, layout, photography

== Charts ==
Chart performance for Ricochet
Chart (2026)	Peak position
Scottish Albums (OCC)	57
UK Albums Sales (OCC)	56
UK Independent Albums (OCC)	27
