= Madonna (Snail Mail song) =

2021 single by Snail Mail

Single by Snail Mail

from the album Valentine
- Released: October 27, 2021
- Genre: Pop
- Length: 2:53
- Label: Matador
- Songwriter: Lindsey Jordan
- Producers: Brad Cook; Lindsey Jordan

Snail Mail singles chronology
"Ben Franklin" (2021)	"Madonna" (2021)	"Adore You" (2022)

Official audio
- "Madonna" on YouTube

"Madonna" is a song by the American solo project Snail Mail from her second studio album, Valentine (2021). "Madonna" is a pop song written by Lindsey Jordan, the sole member of Snail Mail, and was produced by Jordan alongside Brad Cook. Its lyrics focus on the dangers of idolization in a relationship; it prominently features religious imagery, influenced by Jordan's Catholic upbringing. "Madonna" was released as the third single off Valentine on October 27, 2021, alongside an accompanying performance video. Its composition and lyrics were praised by music critics.

== Background and composition ==
Lindsey Jordan, the sole member of Snail Mail, began working on Valentine after she moved back to her parents' house in Baltimore at the onset of the COVID-19 pandemic, and had "nothing else to do but make music". According to Jordan, "Madonna" was the eighth song on the album to be written. The track was inspired by her Catholic upbringing, something which she felt compelled to explore following a 45-day stint in an Arizona rehabilitation facility.

"Madonna" is a pop song with elements of R&B, indie rock, and dance music. Instrumentally, the song begins with a prominent bassline and "languid" drums, and incorporates synthesizers and "sizzling" guitar. Lyrically, Jordan noted that "Madonna" was about the "danger of letting a human in your life become God". It prominently features religious imagery, and she has called the song's tone "bitchy".

== Release and reception ==
"Madonna" was released as the third single from Valentine on October 27, 2021; the cover of the single features Jordan wearing a 19th-century black shirt in front of a white background. Additionally, a performance video recorded at the Armour–Stiner House was released the same day to Jordan's YouTube channel, featuring Jordan singing without simultaneously playing guitar. The song was later released as the sixth track of Valentine on November 5, 2021.

The composition of the song received positive review from music critics, with James Rettig of Stereogum calling it "slinking and sensual" and The A.V. Club's Gabrielle Sanchez praising its catchiness. Hayden Godfrey of Under the Radar called "Madonna" a "welcome change of pace" on its album, with particular attention towards its melody. Paste's Ana Cubas highlighted the song's lyrics, lauding its witty lyricism and highlighting Jordan's maturity on the track.

== Credits and personnel ==
Credits are adapted from Apple Music.

- Lindsey Jordan – vocals, electric guitar, songwriter, producer
- Alex Farrar – keyboards, mixing engineer
- Jake Aron – bass guitar, engineer
- Ray Brown – drums
- Brad Cook – producer
- Emily Lazar – engineer
