= The Seduction of Kansas =

Upcoming album by Priests

Studio album by Priests
- Released: April 5, 2019
- Studio: Elmwood Studio (Dallas)
- Genres: Post-punk revival; art punk
- Length: 42:38
- Label: Sister Polygon
- Producer: John Congleton

Priests chronology
| Nothing Feels Natural (2017) | The Seduction of Kansas (2019) |

Singles from The Seduction of Kansas
- 1. "The Seduction of Kansas" Released: January 9, 2019; 2. "Good Time Charlie" Released: February 20, 2019

The Seduction of Kansas is the second studio album by American rock band Priests. It was released on April 5, 2019, through Sister Polygon Records.

Critically, the album received primarily positive reviews from music critics, who praised the albums critique of capitalism, and American politics, as well as the eclectic influences from gospel music, disco, and art punk. More mixed reviews lamented the album's production quality and vagueness of tracks.

== Release and recording ==
On January 9, 2019, Priests announced the follow-up to their debut album Nothing Feels Natural (2017), titled The Seduction of Kansas. The announcement was accompanied by the release of the title track and its music video directed by vocalist Katie Alice, serving as the album's lead single.

The Priests' core trio is joined by new collaborators on the album, including Janel Leppin who served as the primary bassist and contributed additional songwriting (after having previously played cello, mellotron, and lap steel on Nothing Feels Natural), bassist Alexandra Tyson who also joined the touring band, and producer John Congleton, with whom they recorded for two weeks at his Elmwood Studio in Dallas. The band cited electronic-driven albums such as Massive Attack's Mezzanine, Portishead's Third, and Nine Inch Nails' The Downward Spiral as influences on the record.

== Critical reception ==
Professional ratings
Aggregate scores
| Source | Rating |
|---|---|
| AnyDecentMusic? | 7.4/10 |
| Metacritic | 78/100 |
Review scores
| Source | Rating |
| AllMusic | 4/5 stars |
| Chicago Tribune | 3.5/4 stars |
| Exclaim! | 8/10 |
| The Guardian | 3/5 stars |
| NME | 3/5 stars |
| Pitchfork | 7.7/10 |
| Q | 4/5 stars |
| Rolling Stone | 3.5/5 stars |
| Uncut | 7/10 |
| Vice (Expert Witness) | A− |

The Seduction of Kansas was well received by contemporary music critics. On review aggregator website Metacritic, the album has an average critic score of 78 out of 100, indicating "generally favorable reviews" based on 18 critics.

Heather Phares, writing for AllMusic, gave The Seduction of Kansas four stars out of five, praising the complexity of the record. Phrases said, that while Priests is "too nonconformist to be a traditional punk band, they continue to define themselves as something more challenging and encompassing." Phrase further elaborated and said that Priests "prove risk is still a vital element of their music: The title track's cooing choruses and disco beats flirt with pop while Greer envisions corporations and industries vying for America's heart and soul. Though it's always clear where Priests stand on the issues they address on The Seduction of Kansas, they express them with nuance."

Ellen Priest, writing for Paste gave the album an 8.1 out of 10. Like Phares, Priest also complimented the eclectic ranges of punk influences ranging from post-punk to gospel. Priest called The Seduction of Kansas "both poppy and heady, intelligent and reckless, and sometimes bordering on absurdist". Priest further went on to say that The Seduction of Kansas "calls into question the social landscape of the American heartland and poses Priests as punk's resident anthropologists. First heralded as post-punk heroes, Priests are now much more than that: They’re post-genre saviors bringing vital discourse and sharp observations to the table, still preaching the punk gospel along the way. The Seduction of Kansas is full of tantalizing tales fraught with disturbed characters, some of whom seem far removed from reality, while others are scarily reminiscent of humanity."

In a positive review, Chicago Tribune music beat writer, Greg Kot, awarded the album three-and-a-half stars out of four stars, describing the album as "a withering critique of commodification masquerading as a furious dance-punk album. The follow-up amplifies the hooks, widens the scope, deepens the wordplay". Pitchfork associate editor Anna Gaca also complimented the societal critiques of the album summarizing The Seduction of Kansas as "dense with ambiguities, sacrificing their debut's quotable one-liners in favor of character sketches about the everyday banality of evil." Gaca awarded the album a 7.7 out of 10 rating.

Jordan Bassett of New Musical Express gave the album a more mixed review. Bassett described the album as "old-school punk, anti-capitalist, and outspoken". He summarized the album as being "moved to seek some common ground with the other side – although they remain in opposition. Even without that caveat, ‘The Seduction Of Kansas’ is a fun, dancey funk-punk record that benefits from Congleton's lightness of touch, proof that you can step outside your comfort zone and maintain your sense of self." Laura Snapes, writing for The Guardian, also offered a mixed review, praising the concept, but showing frustration with the overwhelming amount of topics in songs and production quality. Snapes said that "for such an intellectually fearless band, the production is sometimes frustratingly reserved: you can never seem to turn the volume loud enough to give the more biting songs the impact they deserve. And where Priests use spaciousness compellingly on ‘YouTube Sartre’, ‘Not Perceived’ and ‘Carol’ are gloomy and drifting. What is missing, too, is a sense of the intimate peril that made Nothing Feels Natural so incisive: the more personal songs here admit to 'barriers to intimacy', but stop short of breaking through them."

=== Accolades ===
| Publication | Accolade | Rank | Ref. |
|---|---|---|---|
| Magnet | Top 25 Albums of 2019 | 17 | |
| Noisey | Top 100 Albums of 2019 | 81 | |
| Rolling Stone | Top 50 Albums of 2019 | 49 | |
| Spectrum Culture | Top 20 Albums of 2019 | 19 | |

== Track listing ==
| No. | Title | Length |
|---|---|---|
| 1. | "Jesus' Son" | 4:00 |
| 2. | "The Seduction of Kansas" | 3:35 |
| 3. | "Youtube Sartre" | 4:06 |
| 4. | "I'm Clean" | 3:58 |
| 5. | "Ice Cream" | 2:26 |
| 6. | "Good Time Charlie" | 2:47 |
| 7. | "68 Screen" | 4:03 |
| 8. | "Not Perceived" | 5:32 |
| 9. | "Control Freak" | 2:50 |
| 10. | "Carol" | 4:35 |
| 11. | "Interlude: I Dream This Dream in Which My Body Is My Own" | 1:08 |
| 12. | "Texas Instruments" | 3:38 |
| Total length: | | 42:38 |
