= Bodies and Control and Money and Power =

EP by Priests
- Released: June 3, 2014
- Genre: Punk rock; post-punk
- Length: 17:24
- Label: Don Giovanni, Sister Polygon

Priests chronology
Bodies and Control and Money and Power (2014)	Nothing Feels Natural (2017)

Professional ratings
Review scores
Source	Rating
AllMusic	4/5 stars
Bust	4/5 stars
Pitchfork	(7.3/10)
Rolling Stone	3.5/5 stars

Bodies and Control and Money and Power is an EP by the American post-punk band Priests released on Don Giovanni Records and Sister Polygon Records in 2014. The song "Doctor" was ranked 39th in Rolling Stone's list of the 50 best songs of 2014. The album was named the best album of 2014 by Impose Magazine.

== Track listing ==
1. "Design Within Reach"
2. "Doctor"
3. "New"
4. "Powertrip"
5. "Modern Love/No Weapon"
6. "Right Wing"
7. "And Breeding"
