= My Maker =

"My Maker" is a song by Snail Mail used as the second single from her third studio album Ricochet.

== Background ==
Jordan debuted the song in Seattle while on tour with Dinosaur Jr. in 2025.

== Composition and lyrics ==
NME referred to "My Maker" as "a dreamy, acoustic-strummed track." Stereogum called it "a sparkly, strummy '90s-style alt-pop gem."

The song's lyrics deal with the topics of life, death and mortality salience. Jordan said: "'My Maker' was the lyrical jumping off point of the record, the anchor that helped me build the rest of the album around it. I kept thinking about the line 'it’s just sky,' which obviously meant we had to make a video in a hot air balloon. It took six cancelled rides for that to happen, but we finally got up there. I wanted the video to reference the lyrics about mortality, but also about the freedom that comes with realizing fate is out of your hands." British music magazine DIY said the song "finds Lindsey in a meditative mood, musing on flights to heaven and airport tipples."

== Music video ==
"My Maker" was released with a music video, which features Jordan riding in a hot air balloon. Jordan co-directed the video with Elsie Richter. It was mostly done in one take.
