= Flasher (band) =

American indie rock band

- Origin: Washington, D.C.
- Genres: Indie rock
- Years active: 2016-present
- Labels: Domino; Sister Polygon
- Members: Emma Baker; Taylor Mulitz
- Past members: Daniel Saperstein

Flasher is an American indie rock band from Washington D.C.

== History ==
Flasher began in 2016, with their history dating back to Emma Baker and Daniel Saperstein forming Sad Bones whilst still in high school, who released music digitally via Bandcamp. Taylor Mulitz met the duo at a show in 2007. Several years later, Mulitz and Baker formed Young Trynas and released an EP in 2015. The band originally featured bassist Eva Moolchan, who was replaced by Saperstein.

The trio released their self-titled EP Flasher on April 8, 2016 via Sister Polygon Records.

On June 8, 2018, Flasher released their debut studio album Constant Image via Domino Recording Company. Upon its release, the album was given "generally favorable" reviews by Metacritic. Commenting on the recording of the album, Mulitz stated that "“it was kind of traumatic, honestly. We had to go to therapy together" and Saperstein adding that upon returning home from the album sessions that the band "were reeling. We couldn't just pretend we could move forward. It wasn't that we were angry at each other, per se - we just had stuff we needed to work through".

On June 17, 2022, the band released their second album Love is Yours following the departure of bassist Daniel Saperstein.

== Discography ==
=== Albums ===
- Constant Image (2018, Domino Recording Company)
- Love Is Yours (2022, Domino Recording Company)

=== EPs ===
- Flasher (2016, Sister Polygon Records)
- In My Myth (2023, Domino Recording Company)
