= Lush (Snail Mail album) =

Studio album by Snail Mail
- Released: June 8, 2018
- Studios: Outlier Inn (Woodridge, New York); Doctor Wu's (Brooklyn)
- Genre: Indie rock
- Length: 38:16
- Label: Matador
- Producer: Jake Aron

Snail Mail chronology
Habit (2016)	Lush (2018)	Valentine (2021)

Singles from Lush
- 1. "Pristine" Released: March 21, 2018; 2. "Heat Wave" Released: April 26, 2018; 3. "Let's Find an Out" Released: May 16, 2018

Lush is the debut studio album by American indie rock musician Snail Mail, released on June 8, 2018 through Matador Records. The album was produced by Jake Aron.

Three singles preceded the release of the album: "Pristine", "Heat Wave", and "Let's Find an Out".

Lush was nominated for Best Rock Album at the Libera Awards. It is considered by some to be one of the best indie rock albums of the 2010s.

== Background and recording ==
Between 2016 and 2018, Lindsey Jordan released her debut EP Habit, signed a recording contract with Matador Records, toured the US and Europe, and graduated high school.

Jordan said of the writing process for Lush,

"I was putting pressure on myself to make something that mattered to me, so when I graduated it was even harder because it was like ‘Oh I have time [now], why do I not want to write?’"

She also said, "I kind of had to teach myself to love [writing] again and do it for my own reasons; that’s sort of when all the songs started to be better."

Jordan wrote 30 songs for the album. Speaking about her process, Jordan said

"I’ll just record a demo on my phone and wake up at 3 in the morning … I just get so obsessive and I won’t do anything else until the guitar part is done. And sometimes that spoils it for me because I feel like I can’t be objective because I’m just sick of it. Usually I’ll finish the guitar part completely, arrange it, write a vocal melody, and then write lyrics, and in between each section take like a month to chill and go back and listen to it and make sure it’s still special. It’s a weird mental process for me."

She also stated,

"I wrote [Lush] over the span of a year-and-a-half, right up to being in the studio and having to write one or two more and then recording it the next day. I really took my time... I wanted it to be a really concise record as our debut, and I spent a lot of time trying to make everything exactly how I wanted it to be. All the people I worked with in the process of recording were amazing and wonderful. I had infinite resources coming from the Matador departments, which would be incredible. It was a really interesting experience packed full of surprises and difficulty, but it was really cool."

The New York Times said of Jordan's abilities,

"The importance of what she’s saying is really central to what makes her music so special, so she really pushed me for clarity in the production... It’s crazy she knows this much."

Lush was produced by Jake Aron, who was selected by Lindsay Jordan for his "pop sensibilities" and "overall vibe".

Jordan claims to have suffered bouts of severe anxiety throughout the album's recording process. Being on a larger label, this was her first time being required to work on somebody else's timeline. She said,

"It was like this fake-relaxing environment with a pond and animals and shit, and like trees and shit, so it was supposed to be relaxing but I was going crazy... I thought we were in purgatory."

== Music and lyrics ==
Madison Desler of Paste Magazine called the album "a collection of 10 lucid guitar-pop songs." Marcy Donelson of AllMusic explained that Jordan's guitar work was the focal point of the album, and noted the guitar tones for their "hazy quality." She assessed: "Balancing dreamy, complex chords and seductive melodies on the instrument, songs like 'Speaking Terms' and 'Let's Find an Out' have the subtle effect of seeming to sing with accompaniment before her voice makes an entrance. When it does enter, her vulnerable vocal delivery, combined with vexed lyrics that are both confessional and observational in nature, often sounds like a private, handwritten letter that, once out of her system, she'll immediately crumple up and leave burning in an ashtray."

The album's lyrical themes include heartbreak, confusion and loneliness.

== Release and promotion ==
The first single to be released from Lush was the song "Pristine", which was released on March 18, 2018. An accompanying lyrical music video was released on March 21, 2018 which featured Lindsey Jordan singing the song surrounded by the song's lyrics and visuals based on the album artwork for Lush. The single would receive rave reviews from music critics, with Patrick Mcdermott from The Fader dubbing it an "indie rock masterpiece." Mike Katzif of NPR gave the song a very positive review, writing "Rarely can we witness the creative progression unfold from prodigious potential to fully realized vision so quickly. But when watching Snail Mail perform on stage, or hearing how a song like "Pristine" can unwind poetically with such fearlessness, it's clear Lush represents the beginning for a musician with so much to say." In June of 2019, Lindsay Jordan and record producer Jake Aron re-recorded "Pristine" in Simlish for The Sims 4: Island Living.

”Heat Wave", the album's second single, was released on April 26, 2018. The single also features an accompanying music video directed by Brandon Herman which was released on the same day. The video features sequences of Lindsey Jordan playing ice hockey contrasted with footage of her performing the song alone. "Heat Wave" was well-received by critics, with Rolling Stone’s Simon Vozick-Levinson writing "Lindsey Jordan’s song for a green-eyed dream strikes as quick as lightning or a summer crush." The single peaked at No. 94 on the Belgium Ultratop singles chart.

“Let’s Find an Out" was released on May 16, 2018 as the third and final single from Lush. While the first two singles can be considered fast indie rock songs with loud guitars and emotional vocals, "Let’s Find an Out" is much more delicate and calm song by comparison. The single would also go on to receive widespread acclaim. James Retting of Stereogum wrote in a review of the track, "It’s deftly played, just Jordan and a gorgeous weave of interlocking guitars, and it gets a lot across in only two minutes. The song straddles the line between hopeful and wistful; there’s talk of starting anew, but doubt over the possibility hangs in the air."

== Critical reception ==
Professional ratings
Aggregate scores
Source	Rating
AnyDecentMusic?	7.8/10
Metacritic	80/100
Review scores
Source	Rating
AllMusic	4/5 stars
The A.V. Club	A−
Exclaim!	9/10
The Independent	4/5 stars
Mojo	4/5 stars
Pitchfork	8.7/10
Q	3/5 stars
Rolling Stone	3.5/5 stars
Slant Magazine	4/5 stars
Uncut	7/10

At Metacritic, which assigns a normalized rating out of 100 to reviews from mainstream publications, Lush received an average score of 80 based on 25 reviews, indicating "generally positive reviews". Daisy Jones of Noisey described the album as "wrapped up in beauty and transcendence too, each song a vivid snapshot in time, with sadness lingering among all the other complex feelings." Robert Steiner of The Boston Globe expressed excitement for future projects from Jordan, describing how "with Lush full of resonating moments like these, it's exciting to think that Jordan's only getting started." Ryan Dombal of Pitchfork also praised the work of Jordan, comparing the album to the work of Liz Phair, Fiona Apple, and Frank Ocean. He would go on to say "Throughout the record, each line is given its own story. Every vocal feels deeply considered and felt, yet nothing is over-rehearsed. She knows precisely when to dial in and when to dial back, when to fully commit to her longing and when to step back and shake her head at it."

In a positive review, The A.V. Club awarded Lush an A−, while also writing "The crushing sameness of the existence described in Snail Mail’s music means that not every song on Lush is essential, but when Jordan hits, she hits a bullseye, with mini-indie masterpieces like “Pristine" and "Heat Wave" set to inspire another generation of songwriters."

In congruence, Matt Bobkin of Exclaim! gave the album a score of 9 out of 10, and wrote: "Snail Mail never fail to dole out another great riff or hook, and the meticulously arranged tracks keep momentum moving from start to finish. As a songwriter, Jordan doesn't hide behind obfuscating imagery — it's all raw and real. Howling 'stupid, stupid, stupid me,' as she does on 'Golden Dream,' packs more than enough punch."

Lush would go on to be ranked at No. 45 on Paste magazine's 100 Best Albums of the Decade. Staff writer Madison Desler assessed: "Though the highs and lows of the album are subtle, Lush confirms what the Habit EP first introduced. Jordan is a definite talent. The songs illustrate a wise-beyond-years songwriting style, with none of the self-importance and indulgence that can come with more experience. Nothing feels trite or contrived. She’s a natural, with an impressive sense of restraint, placing points of tension and release right where they need to be." No. 48 in Stereogum's 100 Best Albums of the Decade, and No. 122 in Pitchfork's 200 Best Albums of the Decade.

"Pristine" was ranked No. 6 on Pitchfork's 100 Best Songs of the Year, No. 13 in Rolling Stone's 50 Best Songs of 2018, and No. 36 on The Guardian's Top 100 Songs of 2018.

Marcy Donelson of AllMusic gave the album four stars out of five, and wrote that the album possessed "an impressive formula for a debut, and one that succeeds whether listeners are tuning in more for the soundscape or more for the sentiment."

=== Year-end lists ===
Publication	Rank	Ref.
Billboard	25	
Consequence of Sound	22	
Entertainment Weekly	13	
Fopp	91	
NBHAP	14	
NPR	49	
Noisey	4	
Paste	5	
Pitchfork	5	
The Skinny	35	
Stereogum	2	
Uproxx	5	

== Track listing ==
All tracks are written by Lindsey Jordan.

Side A
No.	Title	Length
1.	"Intro"	1:12
2.	"Pristine"	4:55
3.	"Speaking Terms"	3:35
4.	"Heat Wave"	5:08
5.	"Stick"	5:13

Side B
No.	Title	Length
6.	"Let's Find an Out"	2:13
7.	"Golden Dream"	3:27
8.	"Full Control"	2:55
9.	"Deep Sea"	4:42
10.	"Anytime"	4:38
Total length:		38:16

== Personnel ==
Credits adapted from the liner notes of Lush.

Band

- Lindsey Jordan – vocals; guitar
- Ray Brown – drums
- Alex Bass – bass

Additional musicians

- James Richardson – French horn (on "Deep Sea")
- Sam Ubl – percussion (on "Speaking Terms", "Heat Wave", "Stick" and "Full Control")
- Jake Aron – piano; organ; ambient guitar; percussion

Production and artwork

- Jake Aron – producer; engineer; mixer
- Jonathan Schenke – engineer
- Joe LaPorta – mastering engineer
- Lucas Carpenter – assistant engineer
- Michael Lavine – photography
- Mike Zimmerman – design

== Charts ==
Chart (2018)	Peak position
New Zealand Heatseeker Albums (RMNZ)	10
UK Album Downloads (Official Charts)	91
UK Independent Albums (Official Charts)	20
US Heatseekers Albums (Billboard)	2
US Independent Albums (Billboard)	11
US Top Alternative Albums (Billboard)	20
US Top Album Sales (Billboard)	42
US Top Rock Albums (Billboard)	43
US Top Tastemaker Albums (Billboard)	9
