= Janel Leppin =

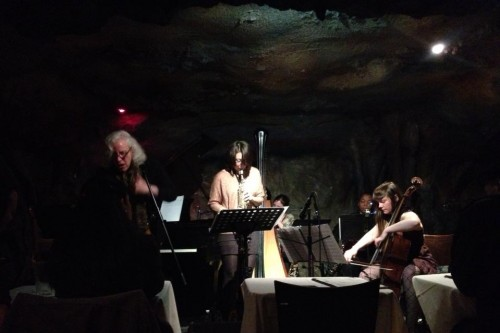
- Ensemble Volcanic Ash performing at Bohemian Caverns, led by Leppin.
- Born: 1981 (age 44–45); Vienna, Virginia
- Occupations: Cellist, composer
- Musical career
- Genres: Jazz, Experimental, avant-garde, modal jazz, free jazz, classical, ambient, rock, punk
- Instruments: Cello, vocals, bass, keyboards
- Label: Cuneiform Records
- Website: janelleppin.com

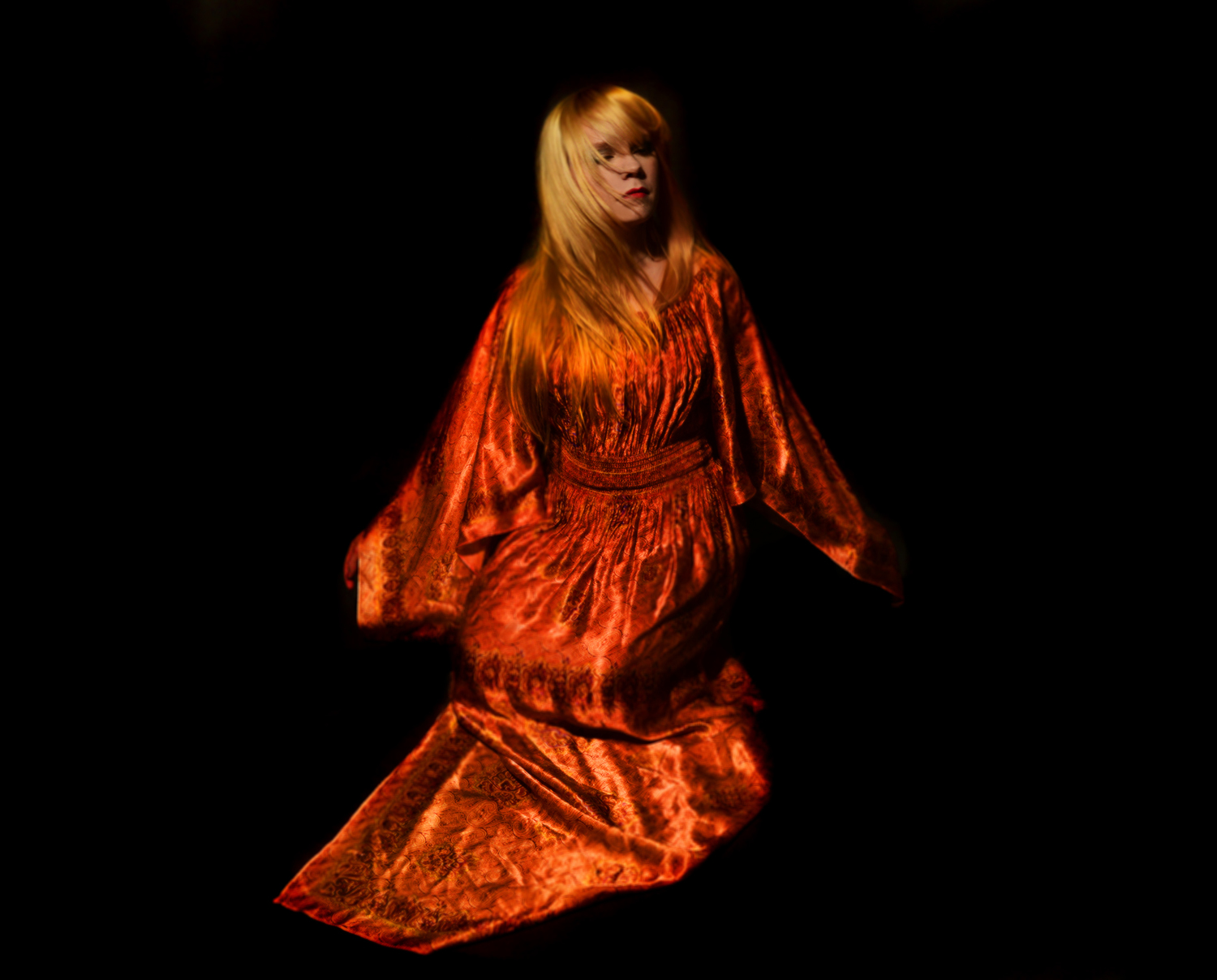
Cover artwork for Mellow Diamond, released 2012 is Leppin's first solo recording.

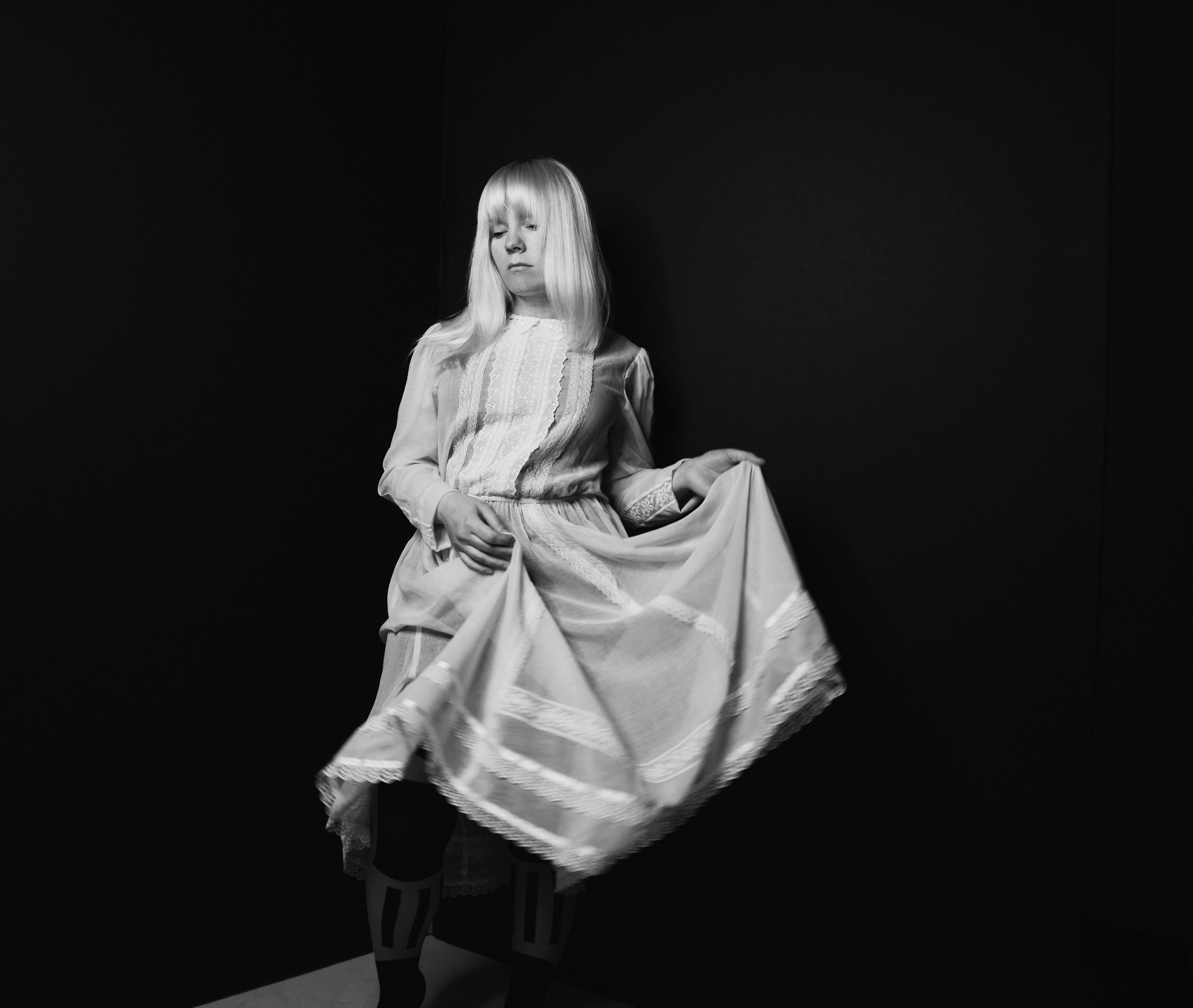
Janel Leppin, photographed by Shervin Lainez in 2016 in Brooklyn, NY.

Janel Leppin (born 1981) is an American jazz and genre crossing cellist, vocalist, multi-instrumentalist and weaver who has toured as a soloist and accompanying artists internationally since 2004. She has presented her work at the Smithsonian American Art Museum, Kennedy Center for the Performing Arts and the ISSUE Project Room.

Leppin released four solo recordings, The Brink (2023), American God (2017), Mellow Diamond (2016), and Songs for Voice and Mellotron (2016). She collaborates as part of Janel and Anthony with her husband, American guitar player Anthony Pirog. Recordings of her work as a composer and side musician appear on Sacred Bones, Bella Union, Touch, Tzadik, Sub Pop, Editions Mego, Sister Polygon, Dischord Records, Ideologic Organ and Cuneiform Records. Her work has experimental, avant-garde, jazz, free jazz, classical, ambient and rock influences.

== Janel and Anthony ==
Leppin records in a cello and guitar duo with Anthony Pirog as Janel and Anthony.

New Moon in the Evil Age (Cuneiform Records, 2024) is a double album with one half instrumental works and vocal works on the second half.

Where is Home was released by Cuneiform Records, in 2012.

The duo released a self-titled and self-released recording in 2007. A Fifth Anniversary Collectors Edition LP was released of the duo in 2010.

"Janel & Anthony - guitars and cello respectively - play a haunting and humbly virtuosic form of music wherein the elements of electronics, looping, and lo-fi timbres live both in intimacy and in majesty in the same house as acoustic instruments and folk/blues-inspired melodies. As such, it is both timely and timeless, drenched as it is in intoxicating atmosphere; wan, quiet voices submitting to waves of sonic drama. Who could possibly resist it?" – Nels Cline,

"..one of the most stunning records this year.. Where is Home is a mind-blowing record that will stay in my listening rotation for years." - Sound Colour Vibration,

"Ethereal..conversational magic" - The Village Voice, "A beguiling, thoughtfully crafted album" - BBC Classical

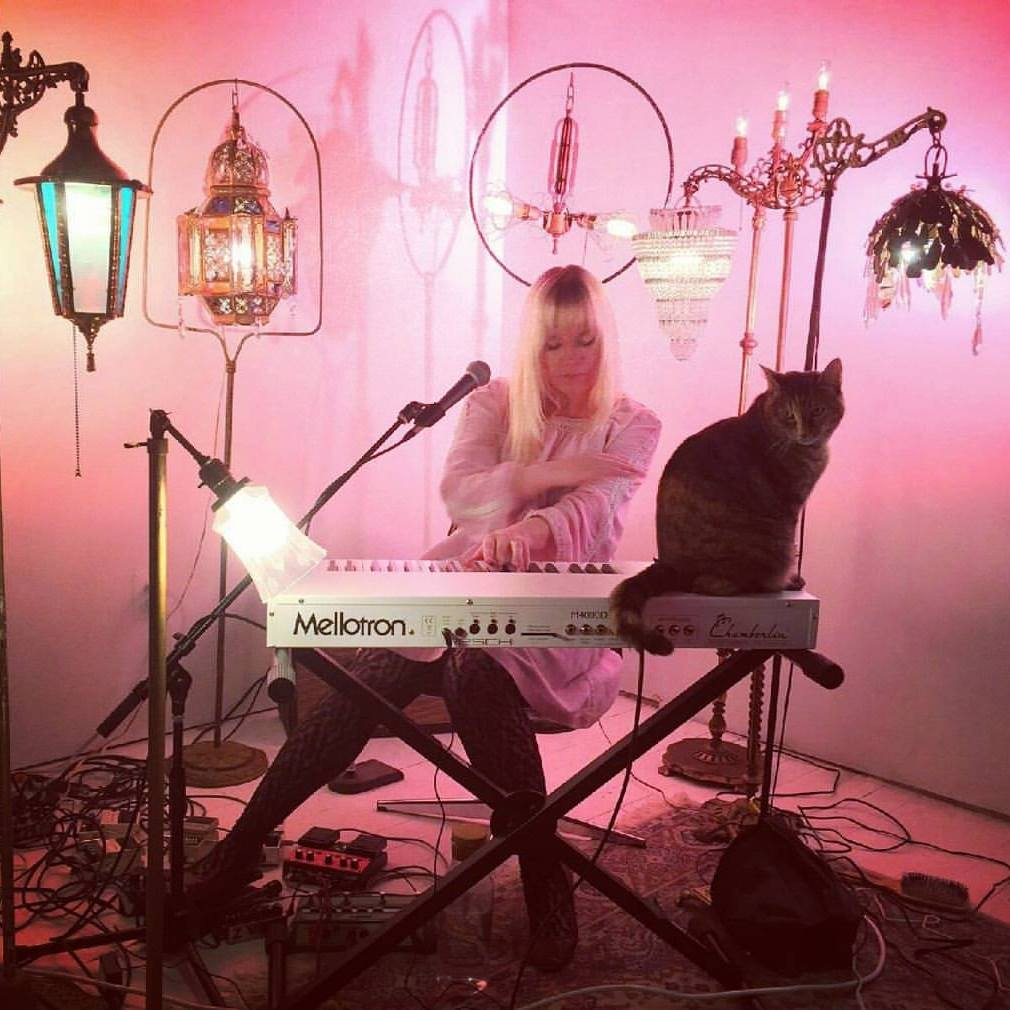
Songs for Voice and Mellotron by multi-instrumentalist and composer, Janel Leppin at the Wilderness Bureau in 2016.

== Solo recordings ==
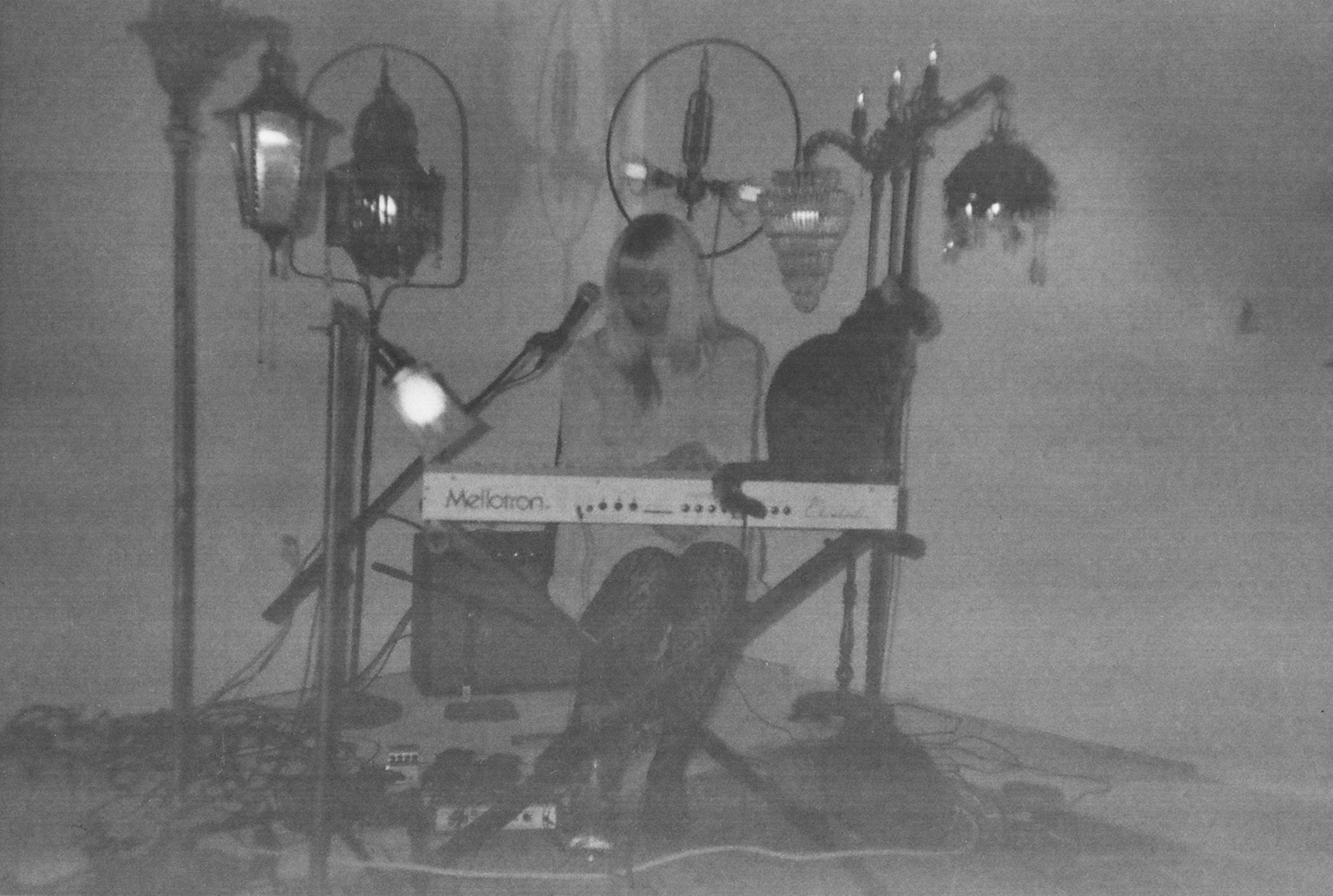
Leppin performing live on the M4000D.

The Brink (Shiny Boy, 2023) is Leppin's first solo cello recording and was performed live without overdubs.

An album for voice and cello called American God was released in April 2017. This album continues with political themes, as Leppin composed it with the 2016 presidential election in mind.

In April 2016, Leppin released two solo recordings; Mellow Diamond and Songs for Voice and Mellotron.

Originally titled "Songs of the One-Armed Woman", Songs for Voice and Mellotron was written in 2015, when Leppin injured her right elbow and was unable to perform solo concerts on her primary instrument, the cello. The EP-length recording includes politically-charged music. Most tracks were recorded live with Leppin singing and playing the M4000D mellotron simultaneously, with little overdubbing.

Leppin's first solo recording, Mellow Diamond, draws from various genres including avant-garde pop and ambient music. She recorded vocals, analog synthesizers, harpsichord, pedal steel, cello, mellotron, found sound samples, and radio frequencies. Several political messages are found in the work.

Music critic Roger Trenwith wrote "Art Holds Her Hand, a funereal paced and sombre death march, atop which Janel’s lilting ice maiden tones lull us into the land of Morpheus with impressionistic tales of the primal forces of Nature."

Lars Gotrich of NPR Music, in regards to Leppin, wrote "instrumental intimacy swept up in arrangements that cluster around her voice, as delicate and as imposing as a sheet of falling ice.”

== Jazz works ==
Leppin leads Ensemble Volcanic Ash and has two recordings with Cuneiform Records; Ensemble Volcanic Ash was released in 2022 and Ensemble Volcanic Ash: To March Is To Love in 2024. This jazz group has included harp, cello, alto saxophone, tenor saxophone, guitar, bass and drums. The group premiered before a sold-out crowd at the Bohemian Caverns in Washington D.C. to positive reviews, being called "Aaah-vant Garde [sic] at its finest." The ensemble has included Luke Stewart, Kim Sator, Sarah Hughes, Mary Lattimore, Brian Settles, Anthony Pirog, Larry Ferguson, Amy Frasier, Jacqueline Poullaf, Betsy Wright and Jaimie Branch.

"It’s rare to encounter a recording with the kind of melodic richness delivered by the latest from Janel Leppin. The magic of the melodies on Ensemble Volcanic Ash is in both their voicing and their motion, behaving like a river that marks the path and carries passengers along by the force of its currents. The mix of chamber jazz, art rock, contemporary classical, and electronic music are merely facets through which the melodies becomes focused, like glass soaking in sunbeams and spitting it back out in a prismatic light show. I’m pretty addicted to this record, and don’t anticipate that waning any time soon; your results may vary—but I doubt it.""-Dave Sumner Bandcamp Daily

Artist	Album	Instrumentation	Label	Year
Janel and Anthony	New Moon in the Evil Age	Cello, Keyboards, Vocals, Art, Photography, Lyrics, Composition	Cuneiform Records	2024
Janel Leppin	Ensemble Volcanic Ash: To March Is To Love	Composer, Cellist, Arranger, Bandleader, Art	Cuneiform Records	2024
Anthony Pirog	The Hunger Artist	Cello, Art	Otherly Love	2024
Janel Leppin	The Brink	Cello, Composition, Art	Shiny Boy	2023
Anthony Pirog	Nepenthe Series I	Producer, Pedal Steel	Otherly Love	2023
Janel Leppin	Ensemble Volcanic Ash	Composer, Cellist, Arranger, Bandleader	Cuneiform Records	2022
Susan Alcorn	The Heart Sutra (arr. by Janel Leppin)	Arranging, Curation, Conductor, Cello, Modified Cello, Cover Art	Ideologic Organ/Editions Mego	2020
Janel Leppin, Susan Alcorn, Meghan Habibzai	Sister Mirror	Cello, Pedal Steel Guitar, Voice	Atlantic Rhythms	2020
Anthony Pirog	Pocket Poem	Cover Art, Co-Production	Cuneiform Records	2021
Janel and Anthony	Where is Home	Cello, Electronics, Voice, Voice, Mellotron, Harpsichord, Bowed and Struck Vibraphone, Prophet Five Synthesizer, Piano	Cuneiform Records	2012
Janel and Anthony	Janel and Anthony	Cello, Keyboards, Voice	Self Released, Cricket Cemetery	2007
Janel Leppin	American God	Voice, Cello, Electronics, Prophet 5 Synthesizer, Baby Grand CP70, Mellotron, Bass Drum	WR	2017
Mellow Diamond	Mellow Diamond	Vocals, Cello, Koto, Pedal Steel, Arp 2600, Prophet 5 Synthesizer, Korg MS-20, Modular Synthesizer, Optigan, Mellotron, Mini Moog, Grand Piano, Upright Piano, Harpsichord, Bowed and Struck Vibraphone, Electronics, Drums, Bass, Guitar, Radio Frequencies, Footsteps, Record Collage, Struck Pan Lids, Tape Loops	WR	2016
Mellow Diamond	Songs for Voice and Mellotron	Voice, Mellotron M4000D, Vibraphone, Electronics, Prophet 5 Synthesizer, Modular Synthesizer	WR	2016

== Also appears on ==
Artist	Album	Credit	Label	Year
Eyvind Kang	Ajaeng Ajaeng	Cello, modified cello, percussion	Ideologic Organ/ Editions Mego	2020
Beauty Pill	Please Advise	Cello	Northern Spy Records	2019
The Messthetics	The Messthetics "The Weaver"	Cello, arranging	Dischord Records	2018
Marissa Nadler	For My Crimes	Cello, mellotron, string arranging	Bella Union (UK), Sacred Bones (NY)	2018
Priests	The Seduction of Kansas	Bass, keyboards, vocals, co-production	Sister Polygon Records	2018
Priests	Nothing Feels Natural	Pedal Steel, Cello	Sister Polygon Records	2017
Orion Rigel Dommisse	Omicron	Cello	What a Mess! Records (FR)	2014
Marissa Nadler	Remembering Mountains: Unheard Songs by Karen Dalton; plays cello on "So Long and Far Away"	Cello	Tompkins Square Label (SF)	2014
Laughing Man	Be Black Baby	Cello	Bad Friend Records	2014
Rose Windows	The Sun Dogs	Cello, modified cello	Sub Pop (WA)	2013
Oren Ambarchi	Audience of One	Cello	Touch Records (UK)	2012
Eyvind Kang	Visible Breath	Cello, modified cello	Ideologic Organ / Editions Mego (FR)	2012
Eyvind Kang	Grass	Cello	Tzadik Records	2012
Anthony Pirog	Trio/Sextet	Cello	Sonic Mass Records (DC)	2012
Anthony Pirog	Trio/Sextet	Cello	Sonic Mass Records	2011
Skysaw	Great Civilizations	Cello	Dangerbird Records (LA)	2009
Ignorant American	Ignorant American	Cello	Sonic Mass Records	2009
