= Valentine (Snail Mail album) =

Studio album by Snail Mail
- Released: November 5, 2021
- Recorded: Early 2021
- Studio: Brad Cook's Studio (Durham, North Carolina)
- Genre: Alternative rock
- Length: 31:34
- Label: Matador
- Producers: Brad Cook; Lindsey Jordan

Snail Mail chronology
Lush (2018)	Valentine (2021)	Ricochet (2026)

Singles from Valentine
- 1. "Valentine" Released: September 15, 2021; 2. "Ben Franklin" Released: October 13, 2021; 3. "Madonna" Released: October 27, 2021

Valentine is the second studio album by American indie rock musician Snail Mail, released on November 5, 2021, by Matador Records.

== Background and writing ==
Lindsey Jordan, known as Snail Mail, tried to begin writing material for her second studio album immediately after her debut, Lush (2018). However, she struggled to write because she was on tour and lacked opportunities for solitude. During the beginning of the COVID-19 pandemic, Jordan returned to her parents' home in Baltimore, where she began to start working seriously on Valentine. In November 2020, Jordan spent 45 days in a rehab facility in Arizona, an experience she references directly in "Ben Franklin".

According to Snail Mail's Twitter, Jordan stated: "Making this album has been the greatest challenge of my life thus far. I put my entire heart and soul into every last detail. Thank you for sticking with me and trusting me, as I turn the page into the new chapter of The Book of Snail Mail."

== Music and lyrics ==
Guitar.com described the album as sounding like a "blend of barbed anti-romance and winsome indie-rock". The album contains elements of hip-hop and yacht rock. It also contains sentimental ballads. The album's instrumentation also employs string sections, drawing comparisons to the Beatles "at their most introspective and austere" from Entertainment Weekly.

Paste referred to Valentine as lyrically a "soundtrack to the trials and tribulations of being a slightly more seasoned though still sensitive twenty-something."

== Critical reception ==
Professional ratings
Aggregate scores
Source	Rating
AnyDecentMusic?	8.0/10
Metacritic	88/100
Review scores
Source	Rating
AllMusic	3.5/5 stars
The A.V. Club	A
Clash	8/10
DIY	5/5 stars
The Line of Best Fit	9/10
NME	5/5 stars
Pitchfork	8.5/10
The Skinny	4/5 stars
Slant Magazine	3.5/5 stars
Uncut	8/10

Valentine received critical acclaim upon release, earning a Metacritic score of 88 out of 100 and the 'Best New Music' certification by Pitchfork. Olivia Horn of Pitchfork wrote that Jordan "flirts with pop—sharpening her hooks, reaching for the synths and strings", in contrast to the "limited possibilities of a three-piece rock band" on her previous album Lush. Horn rated the album 8.5/10, stating that Jordan's songwriting was "dazzlingly sharp and passionate". In a review for NME, El Hunt wrote that "Jordan's songwriting is as astute as ever, and her exploration of love here is set to a rich palette of explorative strings and synths", rating the album 5 stars out of 5. Editors at AllMusic gave the album 3.5 starts out of 5, with reviewer Marcy Donelson arguing that while Valentine represents a "bold musical step" for Jordan, it nevertheless "leaves some of her distinctiveness behind". Writing for Slant Magazine, John Amen also rated the album 3.5/5, concluding that "If Lush presented a snapshot of a particular mindset, a woman trapped in a psychological limbo, Valentine captures the blurry nature of an inquiry still in progress."

=== Accolades ===
Critics' rankings for Valentine
Publication	Accolade	Rank	Ref.
Entertainment Weekly	The 10 Best Albums of 2021	6	
Paste	The 50 Best Albums of 2021	10	
Pitchfork	The 50 Best Albums of 2021	15	
NME	The 50 Best Albums of 2021	24	
Rolling Stone	50 Best Albums of 2021	32	
Stereogum	The 50 Best Albums of 2021	2	
The New York Times: Lindsay Zoladz	Best Albums of 2021	3	
USA Today: Patrick Ryan	5 Best Albums of 2021	3	

== Track listing ==
All tracks written by Lindsey Jordan.

Side A
No.	Title	Length
1.	"Valentine"	3:16
2.	"Ben Franklin"	3:02
3.	"Headlock"	3:12
4.	"Light Blue"	2:34
5.	"Forever (Sailing)"	4:18

Side B
No.	Title	Length
6.	"Madonna"	2:53
7.	"c. et al."	3:23
8.	"Glory"	2:20
9.	"Automate"	3:09
10.	"Mia"	3:27
Total length:		31:34

Japanese edition (bonus track)
No.	Title	Length
11.	"Adore U" (Valentine Demo)	3:37

== Personnel ==
Credits are adapted from the Valentine liner notes.

Musicians

- Lindsey Jordan – vocals; guitars
- Alex Bass – bass
- Ray Brown – drums
- Alex Farrar – keyboards
- Katie Crutchfield — backing vocals on "Ben Franklin"
- Kaitlin Grady – cello on "Light Blue" and "Glory"
- Stephanie Barrett – cello on "Mia"
- Jocelyn Smith – viola on "Mia"
- Kim Ryan – viola on "Mia"
- Liz Stahr – viola on "Mia"
- Adrian Pintea – violin on "Mia"
- Anna Bishop – violin on "Mia"
- Ellen Riccio – violin on "Mia"
- Jeannette Jang – violin on "Mia"
- Meredith Riley – violin on "Mia"
- Treesa Gold – violin on "Mia"

Production and artwork

- Brad Cook – producer
- Lindsey Jordan – producer
- Alex Farrar — engineer; mixer
- Tina Tyrell – photography
- Alexa Lanza – styling

== Charts ==
Chart performance for Valentine
Chart (2021)	Peak position
Australian Albums (ARIA)	35
Scottish Albums (Official Charts)	7
UK Albums (Official Charts)	35
UK Independent Albums (Official Charts)	3
US Billboard 200	61
US Alternative Albums	7
US Independent Albums	10
US Top Rock Albums	6
