= Constant Image =

Studio album by Flasher
- Released: June 8, 2018
- Recorded: 2017
- Studios: Rare Book Room, Brooklyn, NY
- Genres: Post-punk; indie rock
- Length: 31:12
- Label: Domino
- Producer: Nicolas Vernhes

Flasher chronology
Flasher (2016)	Constant Image (2018)	Love Is Yours (2022)

Singles from Constant Image
- 1. "Skim Milk" Released: March 8, 2018; 2. "Pressure" Released: April 19, 2018; 3. "Who's Got Time?" Released: May 24, 2018

Professional ratings
Aggregate scores
Source	Rating
AnyDecentMusic?	7.5/10
Metacritic	79/100
Review scores
Source	Rating
AllMusic	3.5/5 stars
Drowned in Sound	10/10
Exclaim!	8/10
Pitchfork	7.9/10
PopMatters	8/10

Constant Image is the debut studio album by American indie rock band Flasher. It was released on June 8, 2018 under Domino Recording Company.

== Release ==
On March 8, 2018, the band released their first single and music video "Skim Milk". The band explained the song: "The themes in "Skim Milk" and its video might be described as being haunted by your own desire for belonging. We're not bemoaning "no future, no fate," we're advocating for it. From getting a mortgage, to going to college, to crafting public policy, folks are always telling you to think of your future, to make choices in the name of some future. But most folks don't have the privilege to live outside the present."

On April 19, 2018, Flasher announced the release of their debut album, along with the second single "Pressure".

The third single "Who's Got Time?" was released on May 24, 2018.

== Critical reception ==
Constant Image was met with "generally favorable" reviews from critics. At Metacritic, which assigns a weighted average rating out of 100 to reviews from mainstream publications, this release received an average score of 79, based on 9 reviews. Aggregator Album of the Year gave the release an 82 out of 100 based on a critical consensus of 8 reviews.

Bekki Bemrose from AllMusic said: "Their debut is stacked with hooks and radio-friendly tunes, but their melodic sense is matched by an abstract yet incisive lyricism. Flasher appear to have arrived fully formed, with a deeply satisfying debut that's both coherent and imaginative." Savoula Stylinaou from Exclaim! said: "On Constant Image, Flasher speaks to the realities of gentrification, self-discovery and escapism. The band masterfully produce politically charged tracks situated in tales of the everyday struggle of people living in America's political seat."

=== Accolades ===
Accolades for Constant Image
Publication	Accolade	Rank
Bandcamp	Bandcamp's Top 100 Albums of 2018	18
Drift	Drift's Top 100 Albums of 2018	86
Flavorwire	Flavorwire's Top 25 Albums of 2018	21
Gigwise	Gigwise's Top 51 Albums of 2018	26
Paste	Paste's Top 50 Albums of 2018	47
PopMatters	PopMatters's Top 50 Albums of 2018 – Mid-Year	N/A
Pitchfork	Pitchfork's Best Rock Albums of 2018	N/A
Stereogum	Stereogum's Top 50 Albums of 2018	6
Stereogum	Stereogum's Top 50 Albums of 2018 – Mid-Year	44
Treble	Treble's Top 50 Albums of 2018	43
Under the Radar	Under the Radar's Top 100 Albums of 2018	47

== Track listing ==
Constant Image track listing
No.	Title	Length
1.	"Go"	1:41
2.	"Pressure"	3:15
3.	"Sun Come and Golden"	3:35
4.	"Material"	3:46
5.	"XYZ"	2:39
6.	"Who's Got Time?"	2:23
7.	"Skim Milk"	3:44
8.	"Harsh Light"	3:32
9.	"Punching Up"	3:31
10.	"Business Unusual"	3:06

== Personnel ==
Credits adapted from AllMusic

Musicians

- Emma Baker – vocals, drums
- Taylor Mulitz – guitar
- Daniel Saperstein – bass
- Patrick Cain – saxophone
- Owen Wuerker – piano
- Mark Cisneros – saxophone

Production

- Nicolas Vernhes – producer, engineer
- Don Godwin – mixing
- Kyle Joseph – engineer
- Heba Kadry – mastering
