= Welcome to My Blue Sky =

Studio album by Momma
- Released: April 4, 2025
- Studio: Studio G (Brooklyn); Wasatch (Los Angeles)
- Length: 39:26
- Label: Polyvinyl; Lucky Number
- Producer: Aron Kobayashi Ritch

Momma chronology
Household Name (2022)	Welcome to My Blue Sky (2025)

Singles from Welcome to My Blue Sky
- 1. "Ohio All the Time" Released: October 22, 2024; 2. "I Want You (Fever)" Released: January 29, 2025; 3. "Bottle Blonde" Released: February 25, 2025; 4. "Rodeo" Released: March 31, 2025; 5. "Welcome to My Blue Sky" Released: April 23, 2025

Welcome to My Blue Sky is the fourth studio album by American indie rock band Momma. It was released on April 4, 2025, by Polyvinyl and Lucky Number. The album was produced by Momma multi-instrumentalist Aron Kobayashi Ritch.

== Background ==
Both founding members Etta Friedman and Allegra Weingarten admitted to cheating on their partners while touring on the road for their previous album, noting themes of moving on from mistakes and the strength of the friendship between the two bandmates as present on the album.

"How to Breathe", written by Friedman is the band's first song that was explicitly lesbian, although past songs were implicitly written about relationships with women.

== Release and promotion ==
"Ohio All The Time", the album's first single, was released on October 22, 2024, following an October 21 concert at Baby's All Right during which they played the song as well as "Rodeo" and "I Want You (Fever). An accompanying music video for "Ohio All The Time" was also released. The band announced the album alongside the release of the album's second single, "I Want You (Fever)", on January 29, 2025, which was also supported by a music video.

Two more singles, "Bottle Blonde" and "Rodeo" were released on February 25 and March 31 respectively, each with a music video.

== Track listing ==
All tracks are written by Etta Friedman, Allegra Weingarten, and Aron Kobayashi Ritch.

Welcome to My Blue Sky track listing
No.	Title	Length
1.	"Sincerely"	2:06
2.	"I Want You (Fever)"	3:37
3.	"Rodeo"	3:19
4.	"Stay All Summer"	3:28
5.	"New Friend"	3:44
6.	"How to Breathe"	3:30
7.	"Last Kiss"	3:13
8.	"Bottle Blonde"	2:39
9.	"Ohio All The Time"	3:04
10.	"Welcome to My Blue Sky"	3:12
11.	"Take Me With You"	2:49
12.	"My Old Street"	4:41
Total length:		39:26

== Critical reception ==
Professional ratings
Aggregate scores
Source	Rating
AnyDecentMusic?	7.4/10
Metacritic	79/100
Review scores
Source	Rating
AllMusic	3.5/5 stars
Kerrang!	3/5
Paste	7.5/10
Rolling Stone	4/5 stars
Under the Radar	8.5/10

Welcome to My Blue Sky was met with generally positive reviews. At Metacritic, which assigns a normalized rating out of 100 to reviews from mainstream publications, the album received an average score of 79, based on eight reviews. Aggregator AnyDecentMusic? gave it 7.4 out of 10, based on their assessment of the critical consensus.

== Personnel ==
Credits adapted from Bandcamp.

=== Momma ===
- Etta Friedman – guitar, vocals, additional instrumentation
- Allegra Weingarten – guitar, vocals, additional instrumentation
- Aron Kobayashi Ritch – production, mixing, head engineering, bass, additional instrumentation, sampling
- Preston Fulks – drums, percussion

=== Additional contributors ===
- Hayden Ticehurst – engineering assistance
- Sebastian Jones – engineering assistance (all tracks), double bass (tracks 1, 11), piano (10, 12)
- Dorothy Carlos – cello (tracks 6, 10)
- Daria Kobayashi Ritch – album art photos
- Etta Friedman – album art design, layout
- Kelly Sachiko Page – styling
- Matt Colton – mastering
