= Ben Franklin (song) =

2021 single by Snail Mail

Single by Snail Mail

from the album Valentine
- Released: October 13, 2021
- Genre: Synth-pop
- Length: 3:01
- Label: Matador
- Songwriter: Lindsey Jordan
- Producers: Brad Cook; Lindsey Jordan

Snail Mail singles chronology
"Valentine" (2021)	"Ben Franklin" (2021)	"Madonna" (2021)

Music video
- "Ben Franklin" on YouTube

"Ben Franklin" is a song by the American solo project Snail Mail from her second studio album Valentine (2021). "Ben Franklin" is named after the American Founding Father, stemming from an internet meme. It is a synth-pop song with a heavy bassline, synthesizers, and lyrics about heartbreak. The track was written by Lindsey Jordan, the sole member of Snail Mail, and was produced by Jordan alongside Brad Cook. The song also features backing vocals from Katie Crutchfield, a close friend of Jordan's. "Ben Franklin" was released as the second single off Valentine on October 13, 2021, alongside an accompanying music video. It received critical acclaim, with the staff of Rolling Stone naming it the 20th-best song of the year.

== Background and release ==
In November 2020, Lindsey Jordan, the sole member of Snail Mail, went to a rehabilitation facility in Arizona and stayed for 45 days, citing a "unique set of circumstances and challenges" stemming from her early rise to fame. After she left, she was connected to producer Brad Cook by Katie Crutchfield so that Jordan and Cook could record Valentine. Jordan recalled writing the instrumental track to "Ben Franklin" before its melody; it was the only song which she had ever written that way. Later, Jordan mentioned to Crutchfield that she wanted to add harmonies to the song's chorus, leading to her recording backing vocals for the track. According to Jordan, the title of "Ben Franklin" originated from an internet meme about a "presidential-type beat", which led her to title the song's original file "Ben Franklin-Type Beat".

"Ben Franklin" was released as the second single from Valentine on October 13, 2021; Jordan initially expressed apprehension on releasing the track due to its different sound, but ultimately decided to do so. The song was later released as the second track of Valentine on November 5.

=== Music video ===
A music video for the track, directed by Josh Coll, was released on October 13, 2021. As opposed to following a narrative, the song's music video was written by Jordan to "look cool" — it includes scenes of Jordan dancing, playing with a band in a bedroom, playing with a dog, and eating cereal with a snake around her neck. The music video was shot in a New Jersey mansion, with her attempting to capture a "waspy" style inspired by a Tina Barney photograph of a large snake in a mansion. Jordan initially planned to feature a ton of puppies in the video, but decided after an interview process to only use one Golden Retriever named Mayo.

== Composition and lyrics ==
"Ben Franklin" is a synth-pop song with elements of indie rock, dance music, hip-hop, and funk. Instrumentally, the song contains a prominent bassline, "airy" synthesizers, and "crunchy" drums. The song also contains a faint baritone guitar riff, which Jordan stylistically compared to those by Death Cab for Cutie. Additionally, Shaad D'Souza of The Fader stylistically compared the song to those on the St. Vincent album Masseducation, while Abby Jones of NPR Music compared it to those by Garbage.

Quinn Moreland of Pitchfork characterized the song's lyrics as being about "trying to feign apathy in the face of breakup", while Mark Richardson of The Wall Street Journal observed that the lyrics "chastise a lover who didn't honor promises". The song also references her rehabilitation in the lyric, "Post-rehab, I've been feeling so small / I miss your attention, I wish I could call". Jordan has explained how she contemplated omitting the line due to how personal it was, but decided to include it as she "couldn't ignore" the treatment's impact on her and her music.

== Critical reception ==
Upon its release, "Ben Franklin" received critical acclaim, appearing on the 'best songs of the week' lists of Stereogum, Paste, and Under the Radar. Consequence's Bryan Kress chose the track as a highlight on Valentine, while Hayden Merrick of PopMatters wrote that it was one of Jordan's best songs, praising its "Saunders dichotomy" of bleakness and humor. Neive McCarthy of Dork commended the song's atmosphere for its "haunting" yet "grounded" nature. The A.V. Club's Gabrielle Sanchez praised the song's lyrics for being "sharply self aware and honest", and for its complexity. Sue Park of Pitchfork particularly praised Jordan's vocal performance on the track, calling her subdued performance "more vicious than her scream", while Scott Russell of Paste lauded her use of falsetto in the song's bridge. The staff of Rolling Stone named "Ben Franklin" the 20th-best song of 2021.

== Credits and personnel ==
Credits are adapted from Apple Music.

- Lindsey Jordan – vocals, electric guitar, songwriter, producer
- Katie Crutchfield – vocals
- Jake Aron – keyboards, bass guitar, engineer
- Brad Cook – producer
- Alex Farrar – mixing engineer
- Emily Lazar – engineer
