= Snail Mail (musician) =

Solo musical project of Lindsey Jordan

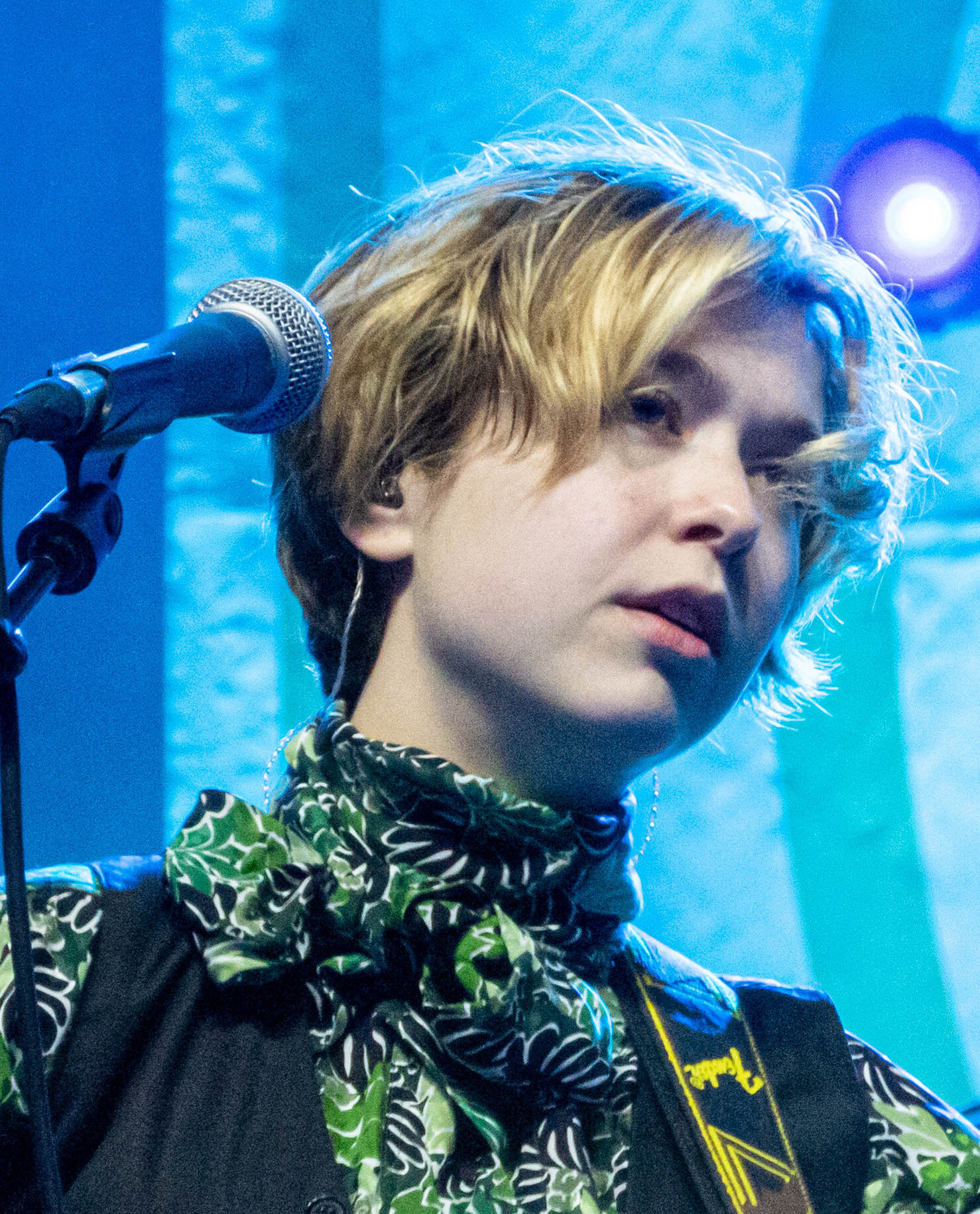
- Snail Mail performing in 2022

Background information
- Born: Lindsey Erin Jordan; June 16, 1999 (age 27)
- Origin: Ellicott City, Maryland, U.S.
- Genres: Indie rock; emo
- Years active: 2015–present
- Labels: Sister Polygon; Matador
- Website: snailmail.band

Snail Mail is the indie rock solo project of Lindsey Erin Jordan (born June 16, 1999), an American guitarist and singer-songwriter. Originally from Ellicott City, Maryland, now based in New York City, New York, Jordan first performed as Snail Mail live in 2015 at the age of 16 and attracted attention with the extended play (EP) Habit in 2016. After signing with Matador Records, Snail Mail released her debut studio album, Lush (2018), to critical acclaim. In 2021, Snail Mail followed up with her second studio album, Valentine. Her third studio album, Ricochet, released in 2026.

Paste called Jordan "one of indie rock's greatest secret weapons."

== Early life and education ==
Lindsey Erin Jordan was raised in Ellicott City, Maryland, a suburb of Baltimore. Her mother is a lingerie store owner and her father works for a textbook publisher. Jordan had a Roman Catholic upbringing. She started playing guitar at the age of 5. She was given classical guitar lessons and was additionally trained in other styles. She recalls playing "awful restaurant shows" with her guitar instructor during her early musical education. She later played guitar for her church's band and for her school's jazz band. Jordan also played hockey during her youth.

As a teenager, Jordan became captivated by punk rock, originating from seeing Paramore live on the Riot! tour at age 8. She cited the experience as a "big moment" that inspired her to eventually form her own band. She also stated that the 2003 film Freaky Friday also played a part in making her want to be a "rocker chick". She started writing her own songs in the seventh grade and began booking her own sets at restaurants and coffee shops. In 2018, Jordan was admitted to St. Joseph's College in Brooklyn, but chose not to attend in order to focus on her career.

== Career ==
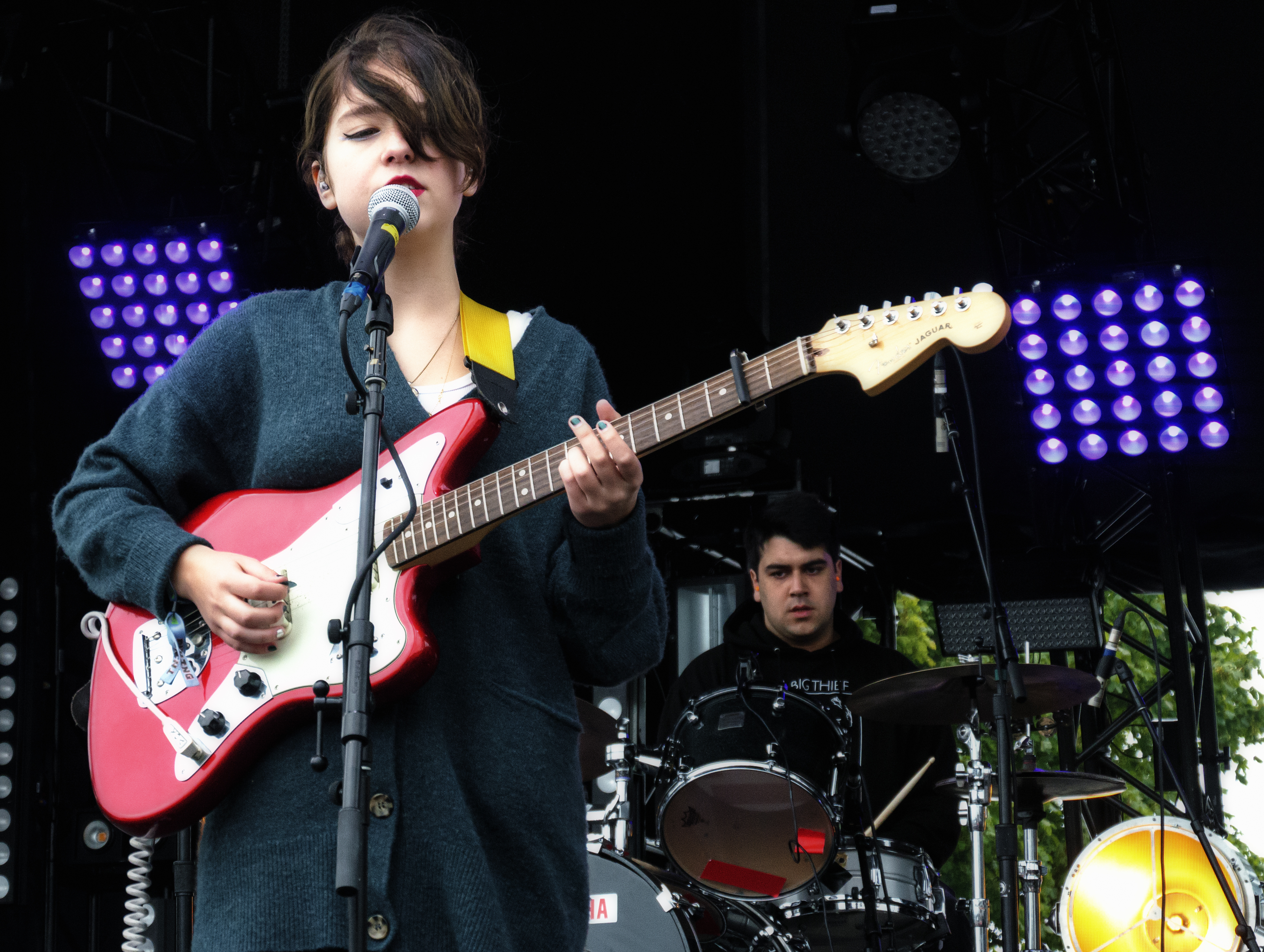
Snail Mail performing at the Thing Festival in 2019, with drummer Ray Brown in the background

Jordan released her self-recorded solo extended play (EP) Stick in 2015 with her new band as Snail Mail. She was joined by Ryan Vieira playing bass and Shawn Durham on the drums. In October 2015, Snail Mail performed her first live show at Baltimore's Unregistered Nurse festival alongside Sheer Mag, Screaming Females and Priests. The set attracted the attention of Priests, who subsequently recruited Jordan to their label Sister Polygon Records. After completing one short DIY tour in July 2016, Snail Mail released her first full EP Habit via Sister Polygon, produced by Priests' G.L. Jaguar and Coup Sauvage and the Snips's Jason Sauvage. The six-track EP received considerable coverage from the indie press. Pitchfork included the EP's opening track, "Thinning", in their "Best New Track" series.

Snail Mail, supported by bassist Alex Bass and drummer Ray Brown, toured North America extensively in 2017 supporting Priests, Girlpool, Waxahatchee and Beach Fossils. In September 2017, Jordan signed a recording contract with Matador Records and performed her first Tiny Desk Concert for NPR Music. Snail Mail's first headlining tour began in January 2018. Snail Mail's debut studio album Lush was released on June 8, 2018, to generally positive reviews from music critics. In 2019, she toured New Zealand, Australia, Canada, and the US, playing with artists such as Mac DeMarco and Thundercat. In June 2019, Snail Mail released a new version of their song "Pristine" in Simlish for the new EA game The Sims 4: Island Living. That same month Matador Records digitally reissued Habit, featuring a cover version of "The 2nd Most Beautiful Girl in the World" by the band Courtney Love, headed by American musician Lois Maffeo.

Snail Mail released her second studio album, Valentine, on November 5, 2021. The album received widespread critical acclaim and appeared on multiple 2021 year-end lists. Regarding Valentine, Jordan stated: "Making this album has been the greatest challenge of my life thus far. I put my entire heart and soul into every last detail." Her original set of US and UK tour dates were also set to begin in November 2021, but Jordan called off the tour shortly before it began due to her finding massive polyps in her vocal cords that needed to be operated on to prevent permanent damage to her voice.

In November 2022, Jordan announced through Variety that she would bring a hometown festival to Baltimore in early 2023 called "Snail Mail's Valentine Fest". The five-night run of shows will take place at the city's The Ottobar venue, with a lineup of special guests that Jordan curated herself, and she told Variety that there are "some fucking insane bands on there."

Snail Mail was part of the lineup for the 22nd Coachella Valley Music and Arts Festival in April 2023. In September 2023, Snail Mail announced a new EP Valentine (Demos), a collection of four previously unreleased demo tracks that were recorded in the process of making the Valentine album. The announcement was accompanied by the release of Easy Thing, one of the four tracks from the EP. The full EP was released on November 3, 2023.

Jordan ventured into acting in 2024, appearing in a small role in the psychological horror drama film I Saw the TV Glow as Tara, one of the protagonists of TV show The Pink Opaque. She also contributed a cover of the Smashing Pumpkins song "Tonight, Tonight" to the movie's soundtrack.

Her third studio album, Ricochet, released on March 27, 2026.

== Artistry ==
=== Musical style and songwriting ===
Snail Mail's music has been described as indie rock, alternative rock and emo. While earlier Snail Mail releases were noted for their sparse, lo-fi guitar-driven sounds, Valentine embraced a richer sonic palette, incorporating synthesizers, strings and samples. Lindsay Zoladz of The New York Times noted Jordan's unconventional sense of melody and a preference for "murky" effects pedals, both exhibiting influences of 1990s indie rock.

Her lyricism has been noted for its candid and introspective nature. According to Madison Desler of Paste Magazine: "Her music is laid-back, gently hooky, and complements the poetic vagueness of her lyrics. There isn't enough detail for you to know exactly what she's talking about, but you understand the mood." Regarding her songwriting process, Jordan stated, "I have a really hard time writing from any place other than complete honesty within myself."

=== Influences ===
Jordan has cited Hayley Williams of Paramore, Liz Phair and Avril Lavigne as her idols and major musical inspirations. Her other influences include Fiona Apple, Cat Power, Elliott Smith, Bon Iver, Sufjan Stevens, My Bloody Valentine and Sheer Mag. Speaking of My Bloody Valentine, she said: "To me, a big part of what makes [that band] special is the sense of androgyny, this trade off between aggression and sensitivity. The fact that they kind of meet at the middle is really beautiful."

Jordan has named Mary Timony her favorite guitarist, and received guitar lessons from Timony herself. Other guitarists who had inspired her include Marnie Stern, Kurt Vile, Steve Gunn and Mark Kozelek.

Additionally, an article published by Fender stated that "it's clear that she has an appreciation of the indie rock pioneers that came before her." Jordan has cited Kim Gordon of American rock band Sonic Youth as a crucial influence. She is quoted by Rolling Stone saying: "I still am like, 'Would Kim Gordon think this was cool? I see her as a beacon of inspiration." Jordan has also listed Lana Del Rey as an influence. She described her first time hearing a 30-second sample of Del Rey's 2011 song "Video Games" on iTunes as her "initiation into alternative music," stating that she "distinctly remember[ed] having this spiritual experience" upon hearing it.

Jordan is also inspired by American jazz pianist Bill Evans. She told Entertainment Weekly: "I guess it's just the motion of it — it shows the spectrum of his work. It starts out kind of big band-y and then moves really dynamically. Then there are more heart-wrenching moments that go into more upbeat stuff. Some of those more thoughtful, slower pieces melodically really inspire me and just put me in touch with what I love about music."

As a preteen, she enjoyed pop-punk bands such as All Time Low.

== Equipment ==
Jordan records with a vintage 1971 Gibson SG, though she refrains from touring with it out of fear of it being damaged or lost. She told Guitar.com: "It’s not worth it to me. It was expensive and setting it up was a whole song and dance, like nothing I’ve ever been through with a guitar before. I love it so much. It’s also the only vintage guitar I’ve ever had. I don’t want anything to happen to it." She also owns a Noventa Jazzmaster and a Rickenbacker 360 semi-acoustic guitar.

== Personal life ==
Jordan is a lesbian. In an interview with The New Zealand Herald, she stated that while coming out as a lesbian "really developed who I am as a person," she "hated having to answer questions about being a woman and being lesbian and being young. All of it, to me, has nothing to do with the music." From 2018 to 2020, Jordan was in a relationship with actress and singer Amandla Stenberg. Since 2022, Jordan has been in a relationship with Etta Friedman.

She resided in New York City as of September 2021, but later moved to North Carolina in 2024. Jordan has obsessive–compulsive disorder (OCD).

Jordan is a fan of jazz music, and has cited the 1959 album Everybody Digs Bill Evans as one of her favorites.

== Band members ==
Current members

- Lindsey Jordan – vocals, guitar
- Alex Russell – bass
- Ray Brown – drums
- Ian Eylanbekov – guitar, backing vocals (2017, 2025–present)
- Isadora Knutsen – keyboards, guitar, cello, backing vocals (2026–present)

Past members

- Blaise O'Brien – keyboards, percussion, guitar (2022–2023)
- Benjamin Kaunitz – guitar, backing vocals (2021–2023)
- Madeline McCormack - keyboards, guitar (2019–2022)
- Daniel Butko – guitar (2018)
- Kelton Young – guitar, backing vocals (2018)

== Discography ==
Snail Mail discography
- Studio albums: 3
- EPs: 5
- Singles: 12
- Music videos: 5

=== Studio albums ===
Title	Album details	Peak chart positions								
Title	Album details	US	US Alt	US Indie	US Rock	AUS	NZ Heat	SCO	UK	UK Indie
Lush	Released: June 9, 2018; Label: Matador; Format: LP, CD, digital download, streaming	— (Note: Lush did not enter the US Billboard 200 but did peak at number two on the Heatseekers Albums chart and number 42 on the Top Album Sales chart.)	20	11	43	—	10	—	— (Note: Lush did not enter the UK Albums Chart but peaked at number 95 on the UK Album Downloads Chart.)	20
Valentine	Released: November 5, 2021; Label: Matador; Format: LP, CD, digital download, streaming	61	7	10	6	35	—	7	35	3
Ricochet	Released: March 27, 2026; Label: Matador; Format: LP, CD, digital download, streaming	—	—	—	—	—	—	57	56	27

=== Extended plays ===
Title	Album details
Sticki	Released: May 8, 2015; Label: Dog Belly; Format: cassette, digital download
Habit	Released: July 12, 2016; Label: Sister Polygon, Matador; Format: Vinyl, CD, cassette, digital download, streaming
Snail Mail on Audiotree Live	Released: June 15, 2017; Label: Audiotree Music; Format: Digital download, streaming
Spotify Singles	Released: June 29, 2022; Label: Matador; Format: Streaming
Valentine (Demos)	Released: November 3, 2023; Label: Matador; Format: Vinyl, digital download, streaming

=== Singles ===
Title	Year	Peak chart positions		Album
Title	Year	US AAA	US Alt	Album
"Pristine"	2018	—	—	Lush
"Heat Wave"	2018	—	—	Lush
"Let's Find an Out"	2018	—	—	Lush
"The 2nd Most Beautiful Girl in the World"	2019	—	—	Habit
"Valentine"	2021	23	32	Valentine
"Ben Franklin"	2021	—	—	Valentine
"Madonna"	2021	—	—	Valentine
"Adore You" (Valentine Demo)	2022	—	—	Valentine (Demos)
"Easy Thing"	2023	—	—	Valentine (Demos)
"Tonight, Tonight"	2024	—	—	I Saw the TV Glow (Original Soundtrack)
"Dead End"	2026	25	—	Ricochet
"My Maker"	2026	—	—	Ricochet
"—" denotes a recording that did not chart or was not released in that territory.

=== Music videos ===
Title	Year	Director
"Heat Wave"	2018	Brandon Herman
"Valentine"	2021	Josh Coll
"Ben Franklin"	2021	Josh Coll
"Dead End"	2026	Elsie Richter and Lindsey Jordan
"My Maker"	2026	Elsie Richter and Lindsey Jordan

== Filmography ==
Year	Title	Role	Notes
2024	I Saw the TV Glow	Tara	Acting debut

== Awards and nominations ==
Year	Association	Category	Nominated work	Result	Ref
2019	Libera Awards	Best Rock Record	Lush	Nominated	
2019	Libera Awards	Best Breakthrough Artist	Lush	Nominated	
2022	Libera Awards	Record of the Year	Valentine	Nominated	
2022	Libera Awards	Best Alternative Rock Record	Valentine	Nominated	
