= Love Is Yours =

Studio album by Flasher
- Released: 17 June 2022
- Genre: Indie rock
- Length: 36:12
- Label: Domino
- Producer: Owen Wuerker

Flasher chronology
Constant Image (2018)	Love Is Yours (2022)

Singles from Love Is Yours
- 1. "Sideways" Released: 15 March 2022; 2. "Love Is Yours" Released: 21 April 2022; 3. "I'm Better" Released: 1 June 2022

Love Is Yours is the second studio album by indie rock band Flasher, released on 17 June 2022 by Domino. The album was created as a duo of guitarist Taylor Mulitz and drummer Emma Baker following the departure of the band's bassist, and was written in 2020 during the onset of the coronavirus pandemic. Upon release, Love is Yours received generally favorable reviews, with critics directing praise to the more introspective, personal lyrics, although with reviews mixed on the merits of the album's lighter, more pop-oriented direction compared to its predecessor, Constant Image.

== Background and recording ==
Love is Yours was recorded by Mulitz and Baker, following the departure of bassist Daniel Saperstein and the movement of Mulitz to Los Angeles, a period in which the duo re-evaluated whether to continue as Flasher. Writing for the album began in 2020 during the early stages of the coronavirus pandemic, during a time in which with Mulitz and Baker had lost their jobs. Early demos for the album were assembled using drum machines and GarageBand samples, with Baker playing a larger role in songwriting, vocal performance, and instrumentation compared to earlier releases. The partnership led to greater openness to experiment with more "poppy" riffs and melodies, with influences including Arthur Russell, Air and Kate Bush. The lyrical content of the album was also intended to reflect a more mature tone, with Mulitz describing the lyrics as centred on "forgiveness" and "coming from a place of making peace with the things that you can and can't control". Songs for the album were recorded in Washington, D.C. with producer Owen Wuerker, who also provided additional instrumentation.

== Release and promotion ==
The lead single, "Sideways", announced in March 2022, featured a video directed by Camille Smura, with Mulitz describing the song as a metaphor about "driving as a means of escape [and] reflection". The second single, "Love is Yours", was released in March. The track, about the "roller-coaster highs and lows of a long-term relationship", was accompanied by a music video, also directed by Camille Smura, inspired by the film National Treasure. A third single, "I'm Better", was released in June, with a vintage-themed music video filmed in central Oregon and directed by Jolie Maya-Altshuler. Flasher toured the United States in promotion of the album over June to September 2022.

== Critical reception ==
Professional ratings
Aggregate scores
Source	Rating
Metacritic	73%
Review scores
Source	Rating
AllMusic	3.5/5 stars
Exclaim!	7/10
Paste	7.2/10
Pitchfork	6.8
Under the Radar	7.5/10

Love Is Yours received "generally favorable" reviews from critics according to review aggregator Metacritic. Hayden Merrick of Under the Radar highlighted the album's "unique personal voice" and core lyrical theme of the "real-life complexity and difficulty of a long-term partnership", stating that the band "masterfully obscures pop songs beneath pointed post-punk". The Fader recommended the album as a "well-rounded listen" that expanded on the debut album Constant Image. Describing the album as a "benevolent, playful record", Christina McCallum of Exclaim! praised the band's exploration of "new territory" in their "brighter, poppier sensibility" and lyrical focus on interpersonal connections. Mark Deming of AllMusic noted that the album lacked the "fine grit" and "scrappy punk energy" of its predecessor, but commended the band for being "more willing to push against their systlistic boundaries" and demonstrated "musical maturity". Max Freedman of Paste considered the album to be a "portrait of change" reflecting the band's leaner membership, praising the album's "faster, more jubilant sounds" but noting the band "often sing quietly where they once playfully sneered, and their guitars often purr where they once roared". Lizzie Manno similarly observed the band's decision to "opt for a more contemplative sound", praising the "admirable devotion to oneself" in the personal lyrics, but assessed the album lacked "the same level of potency and lyrical sharpness as their debut".

== Track listing ==
Love Is Yours track listing
No.	Title	Length
1.	"I Saw You"	3:05
2.	"Love Is Yours"	3:02
3.	"Little Things"	3:25
4.	"Nothing"	3:05
5.	"Spell It Out"	0:56
6.	"Still Life"	3:34
7.	"All Day Long"	3:19
8.	"I'm Better"	2:41
9.	"Sideways"	2:51
10.	"Pink"	1:06
11.	"Damage"	2:22
12.	"Dial Up"	3:10
13.	"Tangerine"	3:36
Total length:		36:12

== Personnel ==
- Emma Baker – drums, guitar, synth, vocals
- Taylor Mulitz – guitar, bass, synth, vocals
- Jon Hand – guitar
- Owen Wuerker – producer, bass, synth, guitar
- Jorge Elbrecht – mixing
- Dave Cooley – mastering
