= Coup Sauvage and the Snips =

American disco punk band

- Origin: Washington, D. C., Prince George's County, Maryland
- Genres: disco punk
- Years active: 2011–2017
- Members: Crystal Sauvage (background vocals); Elizabeth Sauvage (bass); Jason Sauvage (keyboard); Kristina Sauvage (lead vocals); Maegan Sauvage (DJ); Rain Sauvage (background vocals)
- Website: https://www.coupsauvage.com/

Coup Sauvage and the Snips is a disco punk band from the greater Washington, D. C. area. The six member band consists of Crystal Sauvage (background vocals), Elizabeth Sauvage (bass), Jason Sauvage (keyboard), Kristina Sauvage (lead vocals), Maegan Sauvage (DJ), and Rain Sauvage (background vocals). Inspired by ball culture, they style themselves from the "Haus of Sauvage" in Brentwood, Maryland and all have the surname Sauvage. They describe their sound as "inspired by 60s soul, 70s European variety shows, 80s Solid Gold dancers, and 90s warehouse parties"

They released their debut single, "Sneaks", in 2014. In 2015, they released the EP Psalms from Ward 9. (Washington, DC is officially divided into eight wards. "Ward 9" refers to the neighborhoods in Prince George's County, Maryland bordering DC.) The EP contained "Sneaks", "Don't Touch My Hair" (a year before Solange Knowles' single with the same name), and "Requiem for a Mountaintop”. The latter song was inspired by the shooting of Michael Brown and features a chorus repeating "No justice, no peace/Fuck the police".

They released their first album, Heirs to Nothing, on Sister Polygon Records in 2017. The title track complains about gentrification and the disappearance of the familiar in Washington D. C. In an interview they said:

It’s a gospel-house rave-up that’s equal parts club jam and agit-pop protest music. It’s all about how your food truck will not protect you. Your condo will not protect you. Get it together, “urban pioneers” of DC. We’re watching you (and your $5 artisanal sodas).

"Laurel Shuffle" continues the local focus of the album, a tribute of sorts to Laurel, Maryland and Prince George's County. ("We don’t give a fuck, that's why we shot George Wallace") In "Party Rap" they target a D.C. music scene that often celebrates the glories of its predominantly white punk past and excludes other music and people. ("put that indie rock privilege shit on hold")

The band technically disbanded in 2017, though in the wake of the 2020 George Floyd protests they released a collection of remixes of "Requiem for a Mountaintop” with proceeds going to racial justice groups.
