= Sneaks (musician) =

American spoken word and post-punk musician

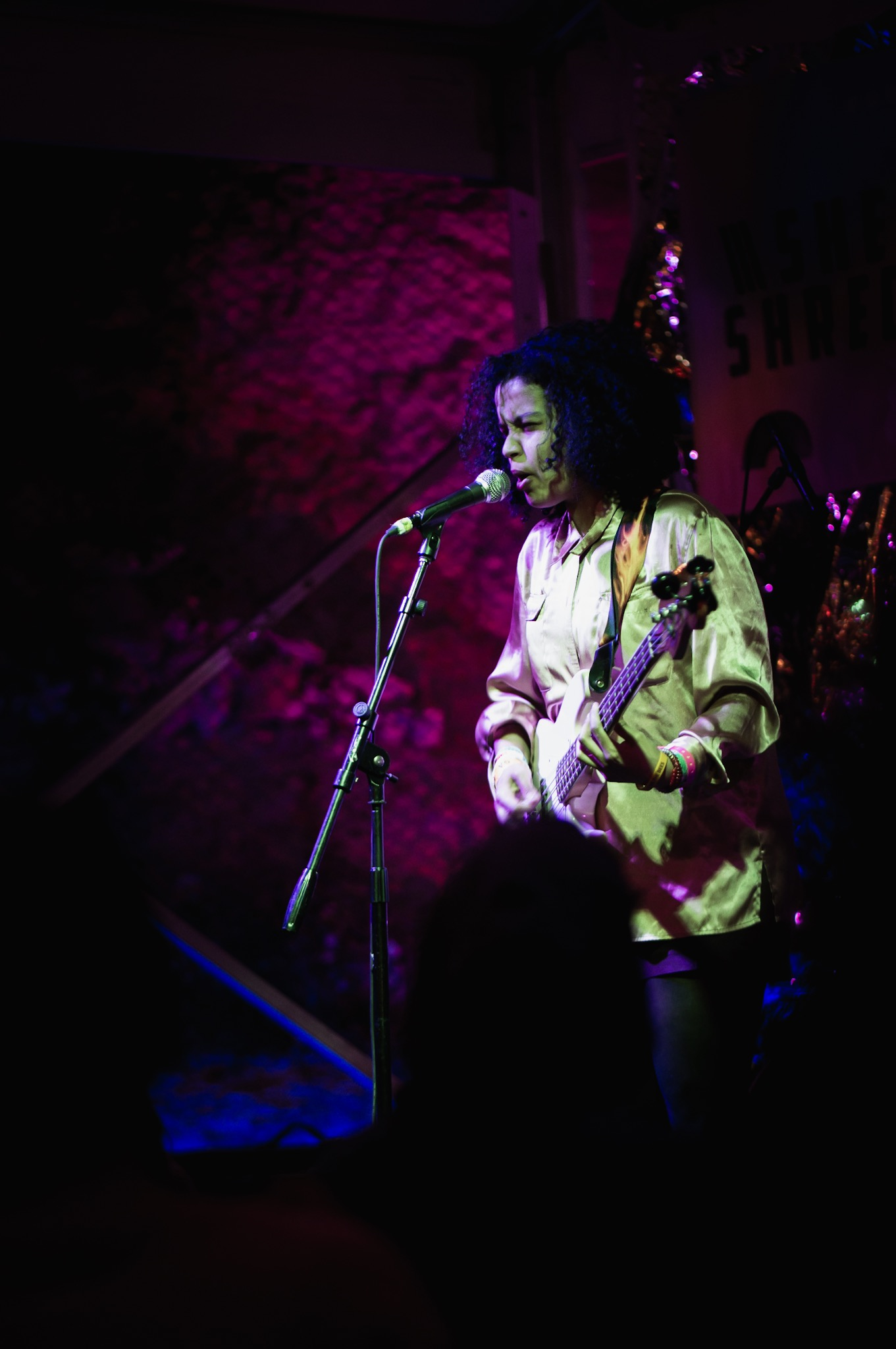

Background information
- Born: Eva Moolchan; Silver Spring, Maryland
- Origin: Washington, D. C.
- Genres: Post-punk, minimalism, spoken word
- Years active: 2010s–present
- Labels: Merge; Sister Polygon
- Website: sneaks.bandcamp.com

Eva Moolchan, better known as Sneaks, is an American spoken word and post-punk musician from Washington, D. C. According to NME's Jordan Bassett, "she favours short, sharp, effortlessly cool compositions that worm their way into your consciousness without breaking a sweat."

== Biography ==
Moolchan was born and raised in Silver Spring, Maryland. She formed the band Shitstains with Katie Alice Greer, in which Moolchan sang and played guitar and Greer played drums. Moolchan went on to participate in Blood, a noise music project, and the Young Trynas, in which she played bass. She then began her solo career as "Sneaks" while attending the Maryland Institute College of Art in Baltimore. Her solo debut recording was the cassette Sneaks, originally released in 2014 on the independent Sister Polygon Records imprint. In 2015, Sneaks was reissued by the French record label Danger Records as an LP under the title Gymnastics. She then signed with Merge Records, which reissued Gymnastics again in 2016. Her second studio album, It's a Myth, was released on Merge in March 2017. It was followed by Highway Hypnosis, which was released in January 2019, also on Merge. Highway Hypnosis was produced by Carlos Hernandez, Tony Seltzer, and Tewadaj Eva Moolchan.

== Discography ==
- Sneaks (Sister Polygon cassette, 2014)
- Gymnastics (Danger, 2015) (Note: Gymnastics was an expanded reissue of Sneaks, with two added tracks. It was also released as an LP, whereas Sneaks has been released as a cassette.)
- It's a Myth (Merge, 2017)
- Highway Hypnosis (Merge, 2019)
- Happy Birthday (Merge, 2020)
- The Eva EP (Merge, 2022)
