= Nothing Feels Natural =

Studio album by Priests
- Released: January 27, 2017
- Genre: Punk rock
- Length: 33:33
- Label: Sister Polygon

Priests chronology
Bodies and Control and Money and Power (2014)	Nothing Feels Natural (2017)	The Seduction of Kansas (2019)

Nothing Feels Natural is the debut studio album by American punk rock band Priests. It was released through Sister Polygon Records on January 27, 2017.

== Critical reception ==
Professional ratings
Aggregate scores
Source	Rating
AnyDecentMusic?	7.5/10
Metacritic	83/100
Review scores
Source	Rating
AllMusic	4.5/5 stars
The Austin Chronicle	4/5 stars
Chicago Tribune	3.5/4 stars
Consequence of Sound	B
Exclaim!	8/10
Paste	8.3/10
Pitchfork	8.5/10
PopMatters	7/10
Under the Radar	7.5/10

Nothing Feels Natural received an average score of 83 based on 13 reviews on Metacritic, indicating "universal acclaim".

In 2026 Rolling Stone placed it at 82 on their list of The 100 Greatest Punk Albums of All Time.

=== Accolades ===
Publication	Accolade	Rank	Ref.
PopMatters	The Best Indie Rock of 2017	10	
Pitchfork	The 50 Best Albums of 2017	25	
Pitchfork	The 20 Best Rock Albums of 2017	6	
NPR	The 50 Best Albums Of 2017	44	
Newsweek	The 17 Best Albums Of 2017	10	
The Atlantic	The 10 Best Albums of 2017	8	
The A.V. Club	The 20 Best albums of 2017	6	
Billboard	50 Best Albums of 2017	25	
Stereogum	The 50 Best Albums of 2017	3	

== Track listing ==
Nothing Feels Natural track listing
No.	Title	Writer(s)	Guest artist(s)	Length
1.	"Appropriate"	Priests	Luke Stewart; Hugh McElroy; Kevin Erickson	5:13
2.	"JJ"	Priests	Perry Fustero	2:57
3.	"Nicki"	Priests	Kevin Erickson	3:40
4.	"Lelia 20"	Priests	Janel Leppin	3:09
5.	"No Big Bang"	Priests	Hugh McElroy	2:48
6.	"Interlude"	Janel Leppin		1:17
7.	"Nothing Feels Natural"	Priests	Janel Leppin; Kevin Erickson; Brendan Polmer	3:59
8.	"Pink White House"	Priests	Kevin Erickson	4:05
9.	"Puff"	Priests		1:52
10.	"Suck"	Priests	Mark Cisneros	4:33

== Personnel ==
Priests

- Katie Alice Greer – vocals
- Daniele Daniele – drums
- G.L. Jaguar – guitar
- Taylor Mulitz – bass, guitar (on "JJ", "Nothing Feels Natural", "Suck")

Additional musicians

- Janel Leppin – cello, mellotron, pedal steel guitar, electronics
- Luke Stewart – alto saxophone
- Mark Cisneros – bass clarinet, tenor saxophone, vibraphone, percussion
- Perry Fustero – piano
- Brendan Polmer – tambourine
- Kevin Erickson – percussion, Rhodes, guitar
- Hugh McElroy – bass, synthesizer

Technical personnel

- Kevin Erickson – producer
- Hugh McElroy – engineer
- Don Godwin – mixing
- T.J. Lipple – mastering
