= Valentine (Snail Mail song) =

2021 single by Snail Mail

Single by Snail Mail

from the album Valentine
- Released: September 15, 2021
- Genre: Indie rock; alternative rock
- Length: 3:16
- Label: Matador
- Songwriter: Lindsey Jordan
- Producers: Brad Cook; Lindsey Jordan

Snail Mail singles chronology
"The 2nd Most Beautiful Girl in the World" (2019)	"Valentine" (2021)	"Ben Franklin" (2021)

Music video
- "Valentine" on YouTube "Valentine" (Lyric Video) on YouTube

"Valentine" is a song by the American solo project Snail Mail. The opening track and lead single from her album of the same name, the song was initially a ballad titled "Adore You" before a chorus was added to it in the studio. The track is an indie rock and alternative rock song about heartbreak, which switches between quiet, synth-driven verses and loud, guitar-driven choruses. "Valentine" was written by Lindsey Jordan, the sole member of Snail Mail, and was produced by Jordan alongside Brad Cook.

The song was first released on September 15, 2021, alongside an accompanying music video featuring Jordan killing a man who kissed her lover at a dinner party. "Adore You" was also subsequently released on February 14, 2022, in commemoration of Valentine's Day. The track received critical acclaim, with music critics praising its sound and widely ranking it as one of the best songs of 2021. The song peaked at No. 23 on the US Adult Alternative Airplay chart, and at No. 32 on the US Alternative Airplay chart.

== Background and release ==
Lindsey Jordan, the sole member of Snail Mail, began working on Valentine after she moved back to her parents' house in Baltimore at the onset of the COVID-19 pandemic, and had "nothing else to do but make music". "Valentine" began as a ballad titled "Adore You", which Jordan wrote towards the beginning of the pandemic. However, despite having written many ballads, Jordan could not find a clear direction for the album as a whole. Once she entered the recording studio, though, she wrote the chorus of "Valentine" and found it "perfect for the project".

"Valentine" was released as the lead single of Valentine on September 15, 2021. The song was later released as the album's first track on November 5, with Jordan performing "Valentine" on The Late Show with Stephen Colbert that night. Additionally, on February 14, 2022, Jordan released "Adore You" to celebrate Valentine's Day; it was later included on the extended play Valentine Demos, a compilation of early demos from the album released on November 3, 2023.

=== Music video ===
A music video for the track, directed by Josh Coll, was released on September 15, 2021. Resembling a period piece, Jordan plays a maid in love with a wealthy woman; after a man kisses her lover at a dinner party, she eats cake and drinks extravagantly before killing the man. Speaking of the video, Jordan noted how she wrote its treatment at the house of her girlfriend's parents, inspired by the movies of Lars von Trier. Afterwards, she decided to work with Coll because his vision was the closest with what she wanted, and as both wished to combine "terror [with] devastating beauty". Writing for Pitchfork, Eric Torres called it the best music video of September 2021, praising how it combined Bridgerton-esque drama with a gory revenge story.

== Composition and lyrics ==
"Valentine" is an indie rock and alternative rock song. The track employs a quiet-loud-quiet structure which Jon Pareles of The New York Times compared to a "passionate, messy, still unresolved relationship". Instrumentally, the song's verses contain "haunting" synthesizers and a clean electric guitar line, which Marcy Donelson of AllMusic stylistically compared to an "'80s power ballad". Afterwards, the song builds to a "driving" chorus dominated by overdriven guitars and a "pace-building" drum beat, which Donelson instead characterized as a "'90s emo rocker". Quinn Moreland compared the track to those by Paramore.

Lyrically, "Valentine" is a song about heartbreak, sung from the perspective of a "jilted ex" who swings between "quiet bewilderment" at her feelings of love, and anger at having been abandoned by her lover. Jordan called the line "Fuck being remembered, I think I was made for you" one of her favorites on both the track and the album as a whole, noting that it "really speaks to [her]" and touches on themes of privacy in love. Additionally, Steven Hyden of Uproxx interpreted the line "Those parasitic cameras, don’t they stop to stare at you?" as being in reference to Jordan's "suffocating indie fame", a perspective shared by Jason Lamphier of Entertainment Weekly. However, Jordan has commented that the line was not about the difficulties of fame, rather it was about the relationship depicted in the song.

== Reception ==
Upon its release, "Valentine" received critical acclaim, appearing on the 'best songs of the week' lists of Stereogum, Entertainment Weekly, and Under the Radar. Various critics praised the song's use of dynamics: Lindsay Zoladz of The New York Times compared its shift from a quiet verse to a "wonderfully loud" chorus to a "carnival thrill ride", while Mark Richardson of The Wall Street Journal noted how the track "perfects this dynamic approach to songwriting". Hayden Merrick of PopMatters wrote that the song contained "arguably the biggest chorus of the year", noting how Jordan's voice had matured since Lush. The song's lyrics have also garnered attention, with Stephen Daw of Billboard writing that "pushes [the song] over the top and into a category of its own". The song has also appeared on the 'best songs of 2021' lists of Spin (ranked No. 2), Slant (ranked No. 3), Paste (ranked No. 5), Pitchfork (ranked No. 8), Variety (ranked No. 9), The Line of Best Fit (ranked No. 15), The Forty-Five (ranked No. 28), and Vogue (unranked).

Commercially, "Valentine" peaked at No. 23 on the Adult Alternative Airplay chart, marking Snail Mail's first entry on any Billboard chart. The song also reached No. 32 on the US Alternative Airplay chart.

== Credits and personnel ==
Credits are adapted from Apple Music.

- Lindsey Jordan – vocals, electric guitar, keyboards, songwriter, producer
- Alex Bass – bass guitar
- Ray Brown – drums
- Brad Cook – producer
- Alex Farrar – mixing engineer
- Emily Lazar – engineer
- Jake Aron – engineer

== Charts ==
Chart performance for "Valentine"
Chart (2021–2022)	Peak position
US Adult Alternative Songs (Billboard)	23
US Alternative Airplay (Billboard)	32
