= Momma (band) =

American indie rock band

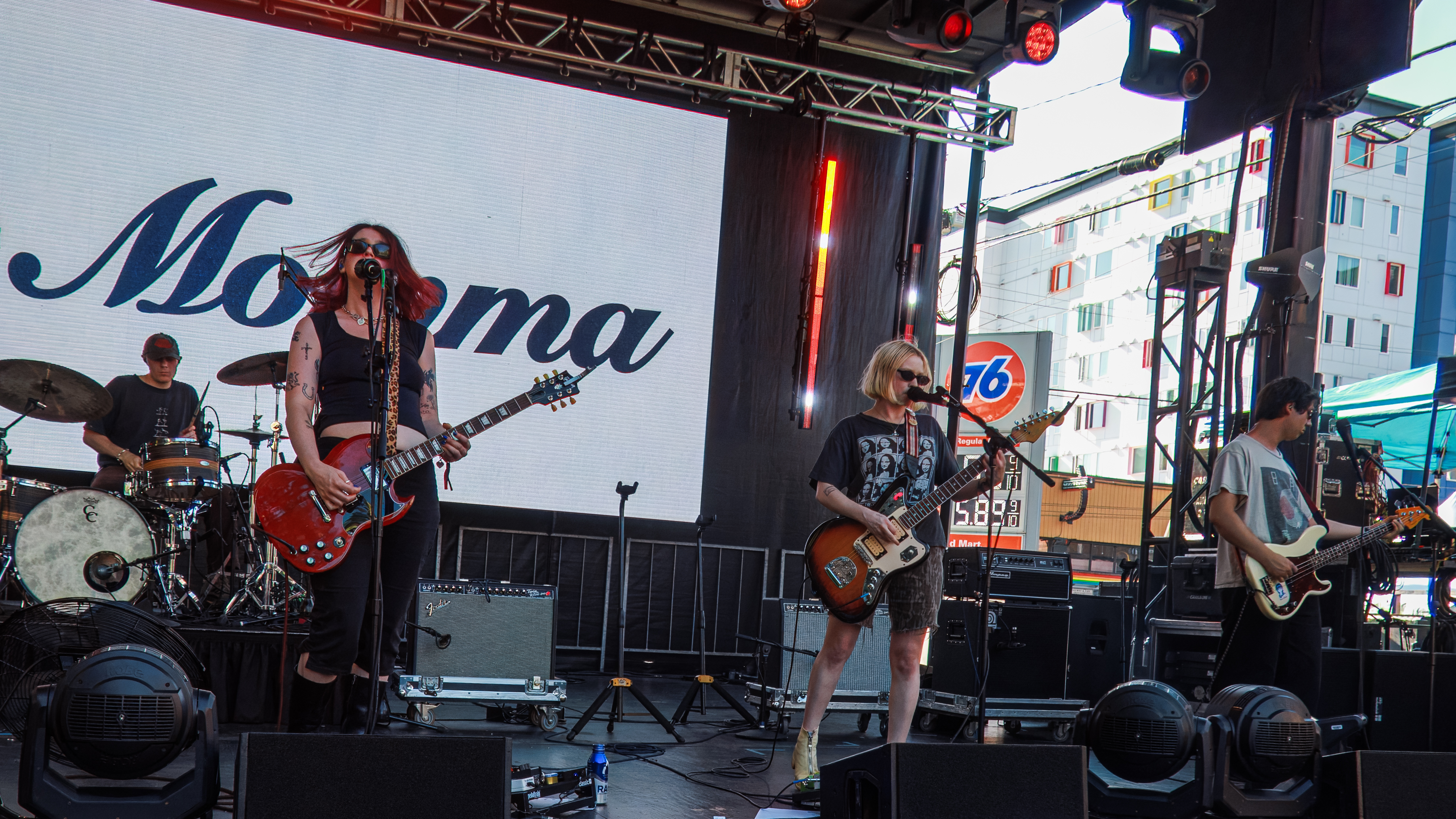
- Momma at Capitol Hill Block Party in 2026

Background information
- Origin: Los Angeles, California
- Genre: Indie rock
- Years active: 2015–present
- Labels: Polyvinyl; Danger Collective; Lucky Number
- Members: Etta Friedman; Allegra Weingarten; Aron Kobayashi Ritch; Preston Fulks
- Past members: Sebastian Jones
- Website: mommaband.com

Momma is an American indie rock band from Los Angeles, California based in Brooklyn, New York.

== History ==
Momma was formed in 2015 by Etta Friedman and Allegra Weingarten, who have been friends since meeting at Viewpoint School.

The band signed with Polyvinyl when the record label cold emailed them.

Momma released their first album, Interloper, in 2018 on Danger Collective Records. On February 24, 2020, Momma announced their second album, Two Of Me, alongside a new song, "Double Dare". On April 6, 2020, Momma shared another song from the album, "Biohazard". The album was recorded during summer break while the members were attending college. The album was described as a concept album "about small-town life in an alternate reality".

The band went on to release their third album, Household Name, on July 1, 2022 via Polyvinyl and Lucky Number to critical acclaim. In mid-2023, they opened several shows for Weezer during their Indie Rock Road Trip tour. They released their latest album "Welcome to My Blue Sky" on April 4, 2025. They opened three shows on The Marías "Submarine Extended" tour in late September 2025.

== Musical style ==
Marcy Donelson of AllMusic called Momma "riffy, ruminative indie rock." The band's songwriting process is a collaborative effort. Stereogum stated that Momma "write big melodies, and they pair those melodies with pedal-mashing fuzz riffs."

== Discography ==
=== EPs ===
- thanks come again (2016)
- Momma on Audiotree Live (2022)

=== Studio albums ===
- Interloper (2018)
- Two of Me (2020)
- Household Name (2022)
- Welcome to My Blue Sky (2025)

=== Singles ===
List of singles, with selected chart positions
Title	Year	Peak chart positions			Albums
Title	Year	US AAA	US Airplay	US Alt.	Albums
"Apollo/Highway"	2019	—	—	—	Non-album single
"Medicine"	2021	—	—	—	Household Name
"Rockstar"	2022	—	—	—	Household Name
"Lucky"	2022	—	—	—	Household Name
"Motorbike"	2022	—	—	—	Household Name
"Speeding 72"	2022	—	—	—	Household Name
"Bang Bang"	2023	—	—	—	Non-album single
"Sunday/Medicine"	2023	—	—	—	Non-album single
"Ohio All The Time"	2024	—	—	—	Welcome to My Blue Sky
"I Want You (Fever)"	2025	14	38	25	Welcome to My Blue Sky
"Bottle Blonde"	2025	—	—	—	Welcome to My Blue Sky
"Rodeo"	2025	—	—	—	Welcome to My Blue Sky
