= Priests (band) =

American post-punk band

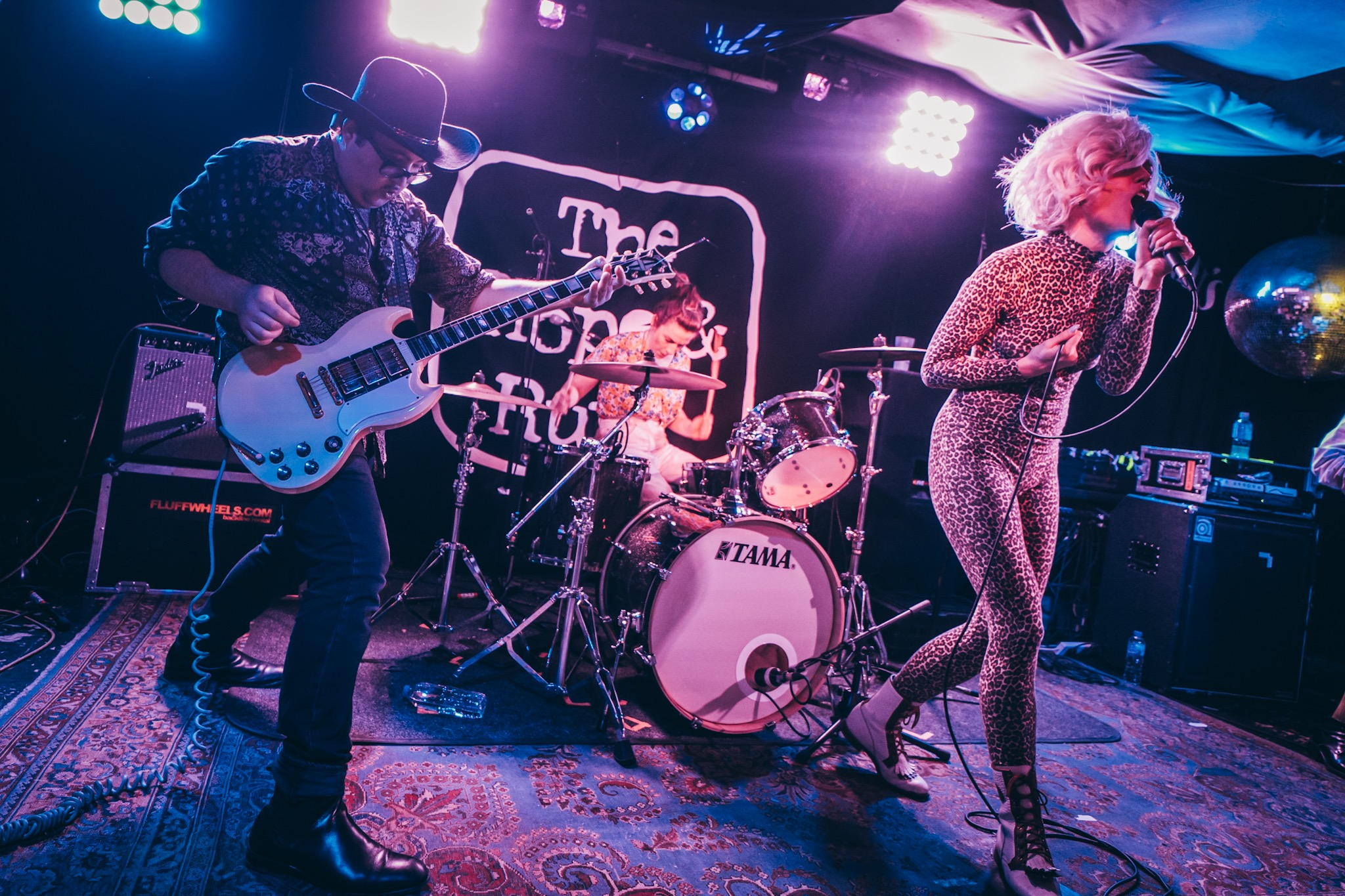
- Priests playing at Hope and Ruin in 2019

Background information
- Origin: Washington, D.C., US
- Genres: Punk rock, post-punk
- Years active: 2012–2019 (hiatus)
- Labels: Don Giovanni, Sister Polygon
- Members: Katie Alice Greer; Daniele Daniele; G.L. Jaguar
- Past members: Taylor Mulitz

Priests are a post-punk band from Washington, D.C., formed in 2012 and composed of Katie Alice Greer (vocals), Daniele Daniele (drums), and G.L. Jaguar (guitar).

Priests have autonomously released three EPs through their independently run label Sister Polygon Records, as well as tapes and singles from acts such as Downtown Boys, Snail Mail, Shady Hawkins, and other local D.C. bands. In 2017, Priests released their full-length debut LP Nothing Feels Natural, which found itself on several best albums of 2017 lists including Billboard, NPR, The Atlantic, Will's Band of the Week, and Pitchfork. On the day of the first inauguration of Donald Trump, just days before the release of the album, the band played an event which they helped organize called "NO: A Night of Anti-Fascist Sound Resistance in the Capital of the USA" at the Black Cat venue. Rolling Stone described the band as "forging jagged incantations that challenge norms ranging from the driving forces of capitalism to punk's own chest-beating macho traditions."

On December 12, 2019, Priests announced that they were going on an indefinite hiatus, releasing a statement reading in part, "We aren’t in a place to write another album together right now, and feel like each of us would be better served pursuing individual projects for the time being." They clarified that they did not intend to break up, saying that they were "not closing off the option of playing together in the future at some point if it feels right, but not for the foreseeable future."

== Discography ==
=== Studio albums ===
Year	Title	Label	Format
2017	Nothing Feels Natural	Sister Polygon	CD/vinyl/digital/zine
2019	The Seduction of Kansas	Sister Polygon	CD/vinyl/digital

=== EPs ===
Year	Title	Label	Format
2012	Radiation/Personal Planes	Sister Polygon	7" vinyl
2012	Tape 1	Sister Polygon	Cassette
2013	Tape Two	Sister Polygon	Cassette
2014	Bodies and Control and Money and Power	Sister Polygon Records / Don Giovanni Records	CD / 12" vinyl
