= Sister Polygon Records =

American independent record label

- Founded: 2012
- Defunct: 2020 (hiatus)
- Genre: Punk, post punk, indie rock
- Country of origin: U.S.
- Location: Washington, D.C.
- Official website: sisterpolygonrecords.bigcartel.com

Sister Polygon Records was an independent record label run by the band Priests. The label was based in Washington, D.C., and released music by Priests, Downtown Boys, Pinkwash, Knife Wife, and Shady Hawkins.

== History ==
Priests created the label in 2012 in order to release their first single, the "Radiation/Personal Planes" 7-inch. The second release was a cassette of the New York feminist punk band Shady Hawkins' 2013 album Dead To Me.

The members of Priests ran the label out of their houses and apartments.

The label was interested in offering a platform to artists who might not have another way to get their music out. In an interview with the Washington City Paper, Priests' drummer Daniele Daniele said: "We're interested in finding people who are underrepresented or weren't signed, making something weird enough where there might not be a normal outlet for it."

The label went on hiatus, which was announced by Priests on Twitter in 2019. The final album from the label released on September 25, 2020.

== Roster ==
Sister Polygon has released music by Priests, Neonates, Shady Hawkins, Carni Klirs, Dudes, Downtown Boys, Pinkwash, Sneaks, Gauche, Hothead, Snail Mail, and Post Pink.

== Discography ==
Catalog #	Artist	Title	Format	Year	Notes
SPR-001	Priests	"Radiation" b/w "Personal Planes"	7-inch	2012	
SPR-002	Shady Hawkins	Dead to Me	cassette	2013	
SPR-003	Carni Klirs	Drift + Fade	cassette	2013	
SPR-004	Priests	Tape Two	cassette	2013	Recorded and mixed by Kevin Erickson at Swim Two Birds
SPR-005	Neonates	Self-Titled	cassette		
SPR-006	Downtown Boys	Self-Titled	7"	2014	
SPR-007	Dudes	Greatest Hits	cassette	2013	
SPR-008	Sneaks	Self-Titled	cassette	2014	
SPR-009	Pinkwash	Your Cure Your Soil EP	cassette	2014	
SPR-010	Pinkwash	Cancer Money b/w Skin	7"		Produced/engineered by Kyle "Slick" Johnson and Al Creedon at Fancy Time Studios
SPR-011	Priests	Bodies and Control and Money and Power	12" EP		Split with Don Giovanni Records
SPR-012	Gauche	Get Away With Gauche	cassette	2015	
SPR-013	Hothead	S/T	cassette	2016	
SPR-014	Flasher	Self-Titled	cassette	2016	Originally released on cassette in April 2016. Reissued on 12" vinyl 11/18/16.
SPR-015	Post Pink	I Believe You, OK	cassette	2016	
SPR-016	Cigarette	Warm Shadows b/w Love's Mirror	7"	2016	Recorded by Kevin Erickson at Swim Two Birds
SPR-017	Snail Mail	Habit EP	cassette / 12" EP	2016	
SPR-018	Pearie Sol	Self-Titled	cassette	2016	
SPR-019	Governess	Self-Titled	cassette	2016	
SPR-020	KAG	EP A	cassette	2016	
SPR-021	Priests	Nothing Feels Natural	12" LP	2017	
SPR-022	Coup Sauvage and the Snips	Heirs to Nothing	cassette	2017	
SPR-023	Hand Grenade Job	Devotionals	cassette	2017	Recorded by Kyle Gilbride
SPR-025	Blood Club	A Wood With Knots	cassette	2017	
SPR-026	Governess	Zero	cassette / CD	2018	Recorded and mixed by Jason Barnett
SPR-027	The Funs	Alienated	12" LP	2018	Recorded by Dave Vettriano at Rose Raft
SPR-028	Ultra Beauty	S/T	cassette	2018	
SPR-029	Priests	SUCK (extended mix & remixes)	CD	2018	
SPR-030	Florry	Brown Bunny	cassette	2018	
SPR-031	Priests	The Seduction of Kansas	CD	2019	4/5/2019 release date
SPR-032	Olivia Neutron-John	Self-Titled	12" EP / CD	2019	
SPR-033	Too Free	Love in High Demand	12" LP	2019	
SPR-034	Knife Wife	Family Party	cassette / CD	2019	
SPR-036	Ziemba	True Romantic	12" LP	2020	
