= The Powerlines Tour =

2026–27 concert tour by Beabadoobee

- Tour by Beabadoobee
- Location: Asia; Europe; North America; Oceania
- Start date: 1 October 2026
- End date: 13 April 2027
- Legs: 4
- No. of shows: 43
- Website: beabadoobee.com/live/

Beabadoobee concert chronology
- The Space In Between Tour (2025); The Powerlines Tour (2026–2027)

The Powerlines Tour is the eighth headlining concert tour by British and Filipino singer-songwriter Beabadoobee. The tour is taking places across arenas in North America, Europe, Oceania, and Asia in support of her album Pylon. It was officially announced on 24 June 2026 through Beabadoobee's social media accounts, following the announcement of the album.

The Australian dates were announced on 1 September 2026 as the third leg of the tour, while the Asian dates were announced on 7 October 2026 as the fourth leg of the tour.

== Set list ==
This set list is from the 1 October 2026 concert in Uncasville. It is not intended to represent all concerts for the tour.

1. "Sun Has Set"
2. "10:36"
3. "Apple Cider"
4. "Radio"
5. "All I Did Was Dream of You"
6. "Take a Bite"
7. "Care"
8. "Coffee"
9. "Pylon"
10. "Pictures of Us"
11. "The Road"
12. "Memories"
13. "Glue Song"
14. "The Perfect Pair"
15. "Powerlines"
16. "Nothing to Prove"
17. "Write Me a Letter"
18. "Satellite"
19. "Post"
20. "It's Alright"
21. "Talk"
22. "Switchblade"
23. "She Plays Bass"
24. "Cologne"
25. "In Motion"

Encore

26. "The Way Things Go"
27. "Lemon to My Lime"
28. "Beaches"

== Tour dates ==
Date	City	Country	Venue
Leg 1 — North America
1 October	Uncasville	United States	Mohegan Sun Arena
2 October	Philadelphia	United States	Liacouras Center
3 October	Boston	United States	TD Garden
5 October	New York	United States	Madison Square Garden
7 October	Toronto	Canada	Scotiabank Arena
8 October	Laval	Canada	Place Bell
10 October	Columbia	United States	Merriweather Post Pavilion
11 October	Raleigh	United States	Lenovo Center
13 October	Orlando	United States	Addition Financial Arena
14 October	Duluth	United States	Gas South Arena
16 October	The Woodlands	United States	Cynthia Woods Mitchell Pavilion
17 October	Del Valle (Note: Labeled as Austin in press material.)	United States	Germania Insurance Amphitheater
19 October	Phoenix	United States	Talking Stick Resort Amphitheatre
21 October	Inglewood	United States	Kia Forum
24 October	San Diego	United States	Viejas Arena
26 October	Oakland	United States	Oakland Arena
28 October	Vancouver	Canada	Rogers Arena
29 October	Seattle	United States	Climate Pledge Arena
Leg 2 — Europe
14 November	Glasgow	Scotland	OVO Hydro
16 November	Cardiff	Wales	Utilita Arena Cardiff
17 November	Manchester	England	AO Arena
18 November	London	England	The O2
23 November	Copenhagen	Denmark	K.B. Hallen
24 November	Stockholm	Sweden	Fryshuset
27 November	Oslo	Norway	Oslo Spektrum
30 November	Paris	France	Zénith Paris
2 December	Amsterdam	Netherlands	AFAS Live
3 December	Amsterdam	Netherlands	AFAS Live
4 December	Brussels	Belgium	Forest National
6 December	Berlin	Germany	Tempodrom
7 December	Düsseldorf	Germany	Mitsubishi Electric Halle

List of 2027 concerts
Date (2027)	City	Country	Venue
Leg 3 — Oceania
15 March	Brisbane	Australia	Brisbane Entertainment Centre
18 March	Melbourne	Australia	Rod Laver Arena
20 March	Sydney	Australia	Afterpay Arena
Leg 4 — Asia
23 March	Seoul	South Korea	Olympic Hall
26 March	Hong Kong		TIDES
27 March	Hong Kong		TIDES
30 March	Kuala Lumpur	Malaysia	Zepp KL
2 April	Bangkok	Thailand	UOB Live
4 April	Singapore		Singapore Indoor Stadium
9 April	Tokyo	Japan	Toyosu PIT
11 April	Kaohsiung	Taiwan	Kaohsiung Music Center
13 April	Pasay (Note: Labeled as Manila in press material.)	Philippines	SM Mall of Asia Arena
