= No Punctuation =

Single by Beabadoobee

from the album Bananas 4 Cats
- Released: November 19, 2026
- Length: 3:17
- Label: Dirty Hit; Interscope

"No Punctuation" is a song by Filipino-English singer-songwriter Beabadoobee. It was released on November 19, 2026, through Dirty Hit and Interscope as the lead single from her fifth studio album Bananas 4 Cats.

== Background ==
"No Punctuation" was originally written more than four years prior to the song's release, being teased over those years. The song was previewed during her encore at a show on November 18, 2025. The song was released the next day as the lead single from Bananas 4 Cats.

== Composition ==
"No Punctuation" is an acoustic guitar-driven song. The lyrics express her affection towards her partner, as she sings, "'Cause you are everything." Paolo Ragusa of Consequence of Sound stated that Beabadoobee has "wistful vocals" in the song. They also compared the song to "Switchblade" and "Sun Has Set" and found that the song "revels in the softer side". The song was stated to be an indie-pop love song by Neon. They noted that the song is "true to the title" because "her lines run into each other without hard stops."

== Critical reception ==
Alex Harris of Neon praised the vocal delivery of Beabadoobee, stating that it's "airy and sweet". They stated that the song "has the glow of a sunlit early-2000s film montage."
