= The Bedroom Sessions =

The Bedroom Sessions or Bedroom Sessions may refer to:

== Albums ==
- The Bedroom Sessions (Faithless album)

== See also ==
- The Early Bedroom Sessions, an album by Basshunter
- Loveworm (Bedroom Sessions), an album by Beabadoobee
- Some Lessons: The Bedroom Sessions, an EP by Melody Gardot
