= Pylon (Beabadoobee album) =

Studio album by Beabadoobee
- Released: 18 September 2026
- Length: 40:58
- Label: Dirty Hit
- Producers: Beatrice Laus; Shane Moran; Gianluca Buccellati; Luca Caruso; Jason Vance Harris; Hayley Williams; Mike Elizondo; Daniel James; Evan Stephens Hall

Beabadoobee chronology
This Is How Tomorrow Moves (2024)	Pylon (2026)	Bananas 4 Cats (2027)

Singles from Pylon
- 1. "Sun Has Set" Released: 24 June 2026; 2. "Switchblade" Released: 14 July 2026; 3. "Memories" Released: 20 August 2026; 4. "Write Me a Letter" Released: 18 September 2026

Pylon is the fourth studio album by Filipino-English singer and songwriter Beabadoobee. It was released by English independent label Dirty Hit on 18 September 2026. Its first single, "Sun Has Set", was released on the album's announcement date. It was followed by its second single, "Switchblade", released on 14 July, and a third single, "Memories", on 20 August.

== Background and release ==
Beabadoobee wrote the majority of the album's lyrics while she was on tour, alone in hotel rooms. The title came from seeing pylons—tall metal structures that support power lines—that Beabadoobee would see from where she was staying, which she felt represented connection to her family and friends far away.

The cover artwork is composed of things Beabadoobee found in her tour bag and represents "life on the road". The trinkets on the cover art include journal pages, a padlock, a chain, and a butterfly. The artwork was designed by Samuel Burgess-Johnson.

On 17 June 2026, Beabadoobee teases a snippet of her lead single, "Sun Has Set". A week later, on 24 June 2026, Beabadoobee released "Sun Has Set" as the lead single from Pylon. Just like the preview date of Sun Has Set, the second release’s release date pre-album was aligned to be a week before it actually released. This would grant the second single of Pylon, "Switchblade" releasing on 14 July 2026. A third single, "Memories", was released on 20 August 2026. Unlike the other two songs, this track released 13 days before its actual release.

== Tour ==
Together with the single and album, Beabadoobee announced a tour for the album, called "The Powerlines Tour", which began on 4 August in Indianapolis, Indiana, and will end on 7 December 2026 in Düsseldorf, Germany. On September 1, three Australian dates were announced for the Powerlines Tour, meaning the tour will end on 20 March 2027 in Sydney, Australia. On 7 October 2026, eight more shows were announced for the Asia leg, extending the tour's end date to 13 April 2027, in Manila.

== Critical reception ==
Professional ratings
Aggregate scores
Source	Rating
Album of the Year	74/100
AnyDecentMusic?	7.4/10
Metacritic	77/100
Review scores
Source	Rating
AllMusic	4/5 stars
DIY	4/5 stars
Dork	4/5 stars
Exclaim!	8/10
The Guardian	4/5 stars
Hot Press	8/10
The Line of Best Fit	6/10
NME	4/5 stars
Paste	B+
Pitchfork	7.2/10
Rolling Stone	4/5 stars

On Album of the Year, the album has an average score of 74 out of 100 from nineteen critic scores. AnyDecentMusic? gave it a weighted average score of 7.4 out of 10 from seventeen critic scores. According to Metacritic, it received "generally favorable" reviews based on a weighted average score of 77 out of 100 from sixteen critic scores.

== Track listing ==
Pylon track listing
No.	Title	Writer(s)	Producer(s)	Length
1.	"Pylon"	Beatrice Laus	Laus; Jason Vance Harris; Shane Moran; Luca Caruso	3:35
2.	"Sun Has Set"	Laus; Moran; Gianluca Buccellati	Laus; Buccellati; Harris	2:21
3.	"Estranged"	Laus; Caruso; Harris	Laus; Caruso; Harris	2:58
4.	"Switchblade"	Laus	Laus; Harris; Caruso	3:01
5.	"Write Me a Letter"	Laus	Laus; Harris; George Daniels; Matty Healy	3:14
6.	"It's Alright"	Laus; Buccellati; Moran	Laus; Buccellati; Moran; Harris	2:51
7.	"In Motion"	Laus; Moran; Buccellati	Laus; Moran; Harris	3:07
8.	"Memories"	Laus; Buccellati; Moran	Laus; Moran; Harris; Buccellati	2:48
9.	"Nothing to Prove" (featuring Hayley Williams)	Laus; Hayley Williams; Mike Elizondo; Daniel James	Laus; Harris	2:24
10.	"Radio"	Laus; Moran; Buccellati	Laus; Moran; Harris	2:40
11.	"Powerlines" (featuring Brendan Yates)	Laus; Buccellati; Moran	Laus; Moran; Harris	2:58
12.	"Spark"	Laus; Evan Stephens Hall	Laus; Hall; Harris	2:47
13.	"Despite That"	Laus; Harris	Laus; Harris	1:29
14.	"Satellite"	Laus; Buccellati; Moran	Laus; Moran; Harris	4:45
Total length:				40:58

Bonus Track Version
No.	Title	Writer(s)	Producer(s)	Length
15.	"Candy"	Laus	Laus; Harris; Caruso	2:32
Total length:				43:30

== Charts ==
Chart performance for Pylon
Chart (2026)	Peak position
Australian Albums (ARIA)	1
Belgian Albums (Ultratop Flanders)	34
Belgian Albums (Ultratop Wallonia)	182
Canadian Albums (Billboard)	65
Dutch Albums (Album Top 100)	33
French Physical Albums (SNEP)	72
French Rock & Metal Albums (SNEP)	16
Irish Albums (Official Charts)	17
New Zealand Albums (RMNZ)	23
Scottish Albums (Official Charts)	1
UK Albums (Official Charts)	1
UK Independent Albums (Official Charts)	1
US Billboard 200	7
US Top Rock & Alternative Albums (Billboard)	3
