= Beatopia =

Studio album by Beabadoobee
- Released: 15 July 2022
- Genres: Indie rock; indie pop; alternative rock; progressive pop; dream pop
- Length: 45:44
- Label: Dirty Hit
- Producers: Beabadoobee; Jacob Bugden; Iain Berryman

Beabadoobee chronology
Our Extended Play (2021)	Beatopia (2022)	This Is How Tomorrow Moves (2024)

Singles from Beatopia
- 1. "Talk" Released: 24 March 2022; 2. "See You Soon" Released: 25 April 2022; 3. "Lovesong" Released: 26 May 2022; 4. "10:36" Released: 15 June 2022; 5. "The Perfect Pair" Released: 26 September 2022

Beatopia is the second studio album by Filipino and English singer and songwriter Beabadoobee. It was released on English independent label Dirty Hit on 15 July 2022. It features collaborations with singer PinkPantheress, Matty Healy and George Daniel of the 1975, Cavetown, and Jack Steadman of Bombay Bicycle Club.

== Critical reception ==
Professional ratings
Aggregate scores
Source	Rating
AnyDecentMusic?	7.6/10
Metacritic	78/100
Review scores
Source	Rating
AllMusic	4/5 stars
The Arts Desk	6/10
Dork	5/5 stars
The Guardian	3/5 stars
Kerrang!	4/5 stars
NME	4/5 stars
Paste	7.4/10
Pitchfork	7.6/10
PopMatters	6/10
The Telegraph	3/5 stars

At Metacritic, which assigns a normalised rating out of 100 to reviews from mainstream critics, the album has an average score of 78, based on 16 reviews, indicating "generally favorable reviews". In a three-star review, Rachel Aroesti of The Guardian said that Beatopia's "crowd-pleasing combination of poppy euphoria, laidback cool and often rather generic lyrics tends not to leave a lasting impression of much beyond stylishly executed nostalgia". Arielle Gordon of Pitchfork criticised the lyrical content of the album as being "often more form than function", though in a mixed review for PopMatters Jay Honeycomb noted that the lyrics deal with the challenges of human intimacy. In a more positive review, Kerrang! characterised Beatopia as a progression from Beabadoobee's debut album with "more diversity, more complexity and less care paid to the genres it falls within", marking an artistic evolution. Similarly, Hollie Geraghty writing for NME sees "the seeds that were planted in Fake It Flowers not only blossom, but inhabit an entirely different world" with Beatopia. In a mixed review for The Telegraph, Kate French-Morris wrote, "Kristi's music may sound fresh to the ears of those born this side of the millennium, but it's rehashed, scrubbed-up, 1990s alt-rock to everyone else, so well-cribbed she sounds like a fictional artist dreamed up to soundtrack a teen movie." Writing for The Line of Best Fit, John Amen scored the project 8/10 and commented, "If Fake Flowers featured Laus toeing the indie line, at times self-deprecatingly, Beatopia is her unapologetic leap into mega viability."

== Track listing ==
All tracks written by Beabadoobee and Jacob Bugden, except where noted.

Beatopia track listing
No.	Title	Writer(s)	Producer(s)	Length
1.	"Beatopia Cultsong"	Beatrice Laus; Jacob Bugden; Iain Berryman	Laus; Bugden; Berryman	2:31
2.	"10:36"	Laus; Bugden	Laus; Bugden; Berryman	3:15
3.	"Sunny Day"	Laus; Bugden; Finlay Dow-Smith	Laus; Bugden; Starsmith	2:40
4.	"See You Soon"	Laus; Bugden	Laus; Bugden; Berryman	3:26
5.	"Ripples"	Laus; Bugden	Laus; Bugden; Berryman	3:07
6.	"The Perfect Pair"	Laus; Bugden	Laus; Bugden; Berryman	2:57
7.	"Broken CD"	Laus; Bugden	Laus; Bugden; Berryman	2:50
8.	"Talk"	Laus; Bugden	Laus; Bugden; Berryman	2:38
9.	"Lovesong"	Laus; Bugden	Laus; Bugden; Berryman	4:05
10.	"Pictures of Us"	Laus; Bugden; Matthew Healy	Laus; Bugden; Berryman	4:39
11.	"Fairy Song"	Laus; Bugden	Laus; Bugden; Berryman	2:44
12.	"Don't Get the Deal"	Laus; Bugden; Jack Steadman	Laus; Bugden; Berryman; Mr Jukes	3:40
13.	"Tinkerbell Is Overrated" (featuring PinkPantheress)	Laus; Bugden; Gemma Walker	Laus; Bugden; Berryman; George Daniel	3:48
14.	"You're Here That's the Thing"	Laus; Bugden; Healy	Laus; Bugden; Berryman	3:18
Total length:				45:44

Beatopia – Japan edition (bonus track)
No.	Title	Writer(s)	Producer(s)	Length
15.	"Back to Mars (Full Band Version)"	Laus	Berryman	1:45
Total length:				47:48

Beatopia (The Antidote Edition)
No.	Title	Writer(s)	Producer(s)	Length
15.	"10:36 (Antidote Live Session)"	Laus; Bugden	Berryman	2:27
16.	"See you Soon (Antidote Live Session)"	Laus; Bugden	Berryman	3:07
17.	"The perfect pair (Antidote Live Session)"	Laus; Bugden	Berryman	1:59
18.	"The Adults Are Talking (Antidote Live Session)"	Julian Casablancas	Berryman	3:05
Total length:				56:37

Notes

- Song names styling:
  - "The Perfect Pair", "Broken CD", "Fairy Song", and "Tinkerbell Is Overrated" are stylised in all lowercase.
  - "Sunny Day", "Don't Get the Deal", and "You're Here That's the Thing" are stylized in sentence case.
  - "See You Soon" is stylised as "See you Soon"

== Personnel ==
=== Musicians ===
- Beabadoobee – vocals, electric guitar, acoustic guitar, percussion
- Jacob Bugden – guitar, programming, synthesizers, keyboards, bass, backing vocals, percussion, flute, drums, organ, mandolin, piano, string arrangements
- Eliana Sewell – bass, percussion, backing vocals
- Luca Caruso – drums, percussion
- Jim Reed – drums, percussion
- Iain Berryman – programming, synthesizers, percussion, Wurlitzer, guitar, bass, piano, gomet, organ, glockenspiel
- Matthew Healy – vocals, guitar
- Jack Steadman – guitar, bass, programming
- Finlay Dow-Smith – drum programming, bass synthesizer
- PinkPantheress – vocals
- Robin Skinner – backing vocals
- George Daniel – synthesizers, programming
- Georgia Ellery – strings, string arrangements
- Gareth Lockrane – flute
- Drew Dungrate-Smith – claps
- Andrea Cozzaglio – metal shutter
- Ben Baptie – programming
- Molly Hayward – percussion, backing vocals
- Soren Harrison – percussion, backing vocals, claps
- Amir Hossain – claps
- Calum Harrison – percussion, backing vocals

=== Technical ===
- Ben Baptie – mixing
- Joe LaPorta – mastering
- Jacob Bugden – engineering
- Iain Berryman – engineering
- Drew Dungrate-Smith – engineering
- Sophie Ellis – mixing assistance
- Claude Vause – additional engineering
- Andrea Cozzaglio – additional engineering
- Jonathan Gilmore – additional engineering (tracks 4, 9, 14)
- Joseph Bodgers – additional engineering (track 12)

== Charts ==
Chart performance for Beatopia
Chart (2022)	Peak position
Australian Albums (ARIA)	19
Irish Albums (Official Charts)	50
Japanese Albums (Oricon)	64
Japanese Hot Albums (Billboard Japan)	89
Scottish Albums (Official Charts)	3
UK Albums (Official Charts)	4
UK Independent Albums (Official Charts)	1
US Heatseekers Albums (Billboard)	2
US Independent Albums (Billboard)	32
US Top Album Sales (Billboard)	29

== Certifications ==
Certifications for Beatopia
Region	Certification	Certified units/sales
New Zealand (RMNZ)	Gold	7,500^{‡}
United Kingdom (BPI)	Silver	60,000^{‡}
^{‡} Sales+streaming figures based on certification alone.
