= Bananas 4 Cats =

Studio album by Beabadoobee
- Released: 19 February 2027
- Studio: Beabadoobee's home (East London)
- Labels: Dirty Hit; Interscope

Beabadoobee chronology
Pylon (2026)	Bananas 4 Cats (2027)

Singles from Bananas 4 Cats
- 1. "No Punctuation" Released: 19 November 2026

Bananas 4 Cats is the upcoming fifth studio album by Filipino-English singer-songwriter Beabadoobee. It is set to be released on 19 February 2027, through Dirty Hit and Interscope Records.

== Background and production ==
The album comes just five months after its predecessor Pylon; its announcement and the release of lead single "No Punctuation" occurred in the midst of the tour promoting Pylon on 19 November 2026. Beabadoobee explained that the album's title through a post on X, saying that she had always been "bananas 4 cats." The album's artwork features Beabadoobee wearing cat ears, surrounded by banana-colored drawings.

Consequence reported that Bananas 4 Cats was created within Beabadoobee's living room with "a friend, her partner, and her cats." She explained that she felt inspired after returning home from creating Pylon. Her friend Luca Caruso helped create and produce the project.
