= Our Extended Play =

EP by Beabadoobee
- Released: June 24, 2021
- Genre: Indie rock
- Length: 12:47
- Label: Dirty Hit

Beabadoobee chronology
| Fake It Flowers (2020) | Our Extended Play (2021) | Beatopia (2022) |

Singles from Our Extended Play
- 1. "Last Day On Earth" Released: 25 March 2021

Our Extended Play is the fifth extended play by Filipino and English singer-songwriter Beabadoobee. The EP was released on 24 June 2021 by independent record label Dirty Hit, and was preceded by the single "Last Day On Earth". The EP was a collaborative effort between Beabadoobee, Matty Healy, and George Daniel, both members of The 1975.

== Critical reception ==
Our Extended Play was met with positive reviews upon release. On Metacritic, which assigns a normalised rating out of 100 to reviews from music critics, Our Extended Play received an average score of 81 based on five reviews, indicating "universal acclaim".

Thomas Smith of NME wrote that the "tracks offer sharper, more focused songwriting and production that bridges the gap between her grungey earlier work and a potentially pop-orientated future." He noted that the EP was "a project that's rewarding for both listeners and, by the sounds of it, the artists involved."

Pete Tosiello of Pitchfork described 'Cologne' as "coy and syrupy" and said that 'He Gets Me So High' had a "buoyant arrangement."

Professional ratings
Aggregate scores
| Source | Rating |
|---|---|
| Metacritic | 81/100 |
Review scores
| Source | Rating |
| Clash | 7/10 |
| NME | 4/5 stars |
| Pitchfork | 7.1/10 |

== Track listing ==
Our Extended Play track listing

| No. | Title | Length |
|---|---|---|
| 1. | "Last Day On Earth" | 3:43 |
| 2. | "Cologne" | 2:44 |
| 3. | "Animal Noises" | 3:34 |
| 4. | "He Gets Me So High" | 2:45 |
| Total length: | | 12:47 |
