= Pretty Sick =

American rock band from New York City

- Also known as: Sicky Sab (for Sabrina Fuentes)
- Origin: New York City, New York, U.S.
- Genres: Indie rock; grunge; electronic
- Years active: 2014–2018; 2019–present
- Label: Dirty Hit
- Members: Sabrina Fuentes; Eva Kaufman; Benjamin Arauz
- Past members: Ella Moore (Cleo Reed); Wade Oates; Austin Williamson

Pretty Sick is an American indie rock band from New York City, New York. It currently consists of vocalist and bassist Sabrina Fuentes, drummer Eva Kaufman, and guitarist Benjamin Arauz.

== History ==
Despite the band's long presence and tight-knit fanbase, especially on the Lower East Side of Manhattan, it is only in recent years that they have garnered recognition from major national publications such as i-D, Nylon, and Pigeons and Planes. In May 2020, Pretty Sick signed to the British record label Dirty Hit, known for acts such as The 1975 and beabadoobee. The group has primarily performed throughout the greater New York City area and more recently around London.

In February 2021, the band produced the theme song to the ongoing variety series, Story of my Fucking Life, created by Manon Macasaet.

The band's debut album, Makes Me Sick Makes Me Smile, was released on Dirty Hit on September 30, 2022. It embarked on a North American tour in support of the album in 2022.

Sabrina Fuentes acted in the 2023 film Salamander Days.

In June 2026, the band released "home2hide" as a single for their second album Anarchy. The album was released on September 11, 2026.

On August 23, 2026, "Human Condition" appeared during the end credits of the second episode of the HBO/HBO Max series Lanterns.

== Musical style ==
Pretty Sick's music is now primarily rooted in alternative-rock, grunge, riot grrrl, and post-punk, while their earlier music was considered far more indie-rock. Over the years, the production style has become increasingly gritty and dark.

Their music videos are equally notable for their transgressive nature, marked by bloody traffic collisions, operating rooms, and erotic aggression.

== Discography ==
=== Studio albums ===
List of studio albums, with year released
Title	Album details
Makes Me Sick Makes Me Smile	Released: September 30, 2022; Label: Dirty Hit; Format: Digital download
Anarchy	Released: September 11, 2026; Label: Dirty Hit; Format: Digital download

=== Studio EPs ===
List of extended plays, with year released
Title	Album details
Deep Divine	Released: October 29, 2020; Label: Dirty Hit; Format: Digital download
Come Down	Released: June 17, 2021; Label: Dirty Hit; Formats: Digital download
Streetwise	Released: June 27, 2024; Label: Dirty Hit; Formats: Digital download

=== Self-released EPs ===
List of extended plays, with year released
Title	Album details
Pretty Sick	Released: April 12, 2016; Formats: Digital download

=== Singles ===
Title	Year	Music Video	Album
"Warm Hands"	2017	No	Pretty Sick (EP)
"Dumb"	2018	Yes	Come Down
"Telephone"	2019	Yes	Deep Divine
"Allen Street"	2020	Yes	Deep Divine
"Angel Landing"	2020	Yes	Deep Divine
"Superstar"	2021	Yes	Deep Divine
"Devil in Me"	2021	Yes	Come Down
"Bet My Blood"	2021	Yes	Come Down
"Physical"	2021	Yes	Come Down

=== Other appearances ===
Title	Year
"Ketamean (NY Mix)" (Anonymous Club feat. Pretty Sick)	2021
