= Makes Me Sick Makes Me Smile =

Studio album by Pretty Sick
- Released: September 30, 2022
- Length: 43:07
- Label: Dirty Hit
- Producer: Paul Q. Kolderie

Singles from Makes Me Sick Makes Me Smile
- 1. "Human Condition" Released: July 21, 2022; 2. "Black Tar" Released: August 17, 2022

Professional ratings
Aggregate scores
Source	Rating
Metacritic	73/100
Review scores
Source	Rating
Clash	9/10
DIY	4/5 stars
The Line of Best Fit	6/10
Paste	7.2/10
Pitchfork	6.3/10

Makes Me Sick Makes Me Smile is the debut studio album by American indie rock band Pretty Sick. It was released on September 30, 2022, by Dirty Hit. The album has produced the singles "Human Condition" and "Black Tar".

== Background ==
On July 21, 2022, Pretty Sick announced the release of their debut album, along with the first single "Human Condition". The second single "Black Tar" was released on August 17, 2022.

== Critical reception ==
Makes Me Sick Makes Me Smile was met with "generally favorable" reviews from critics. At Metacritic, which assigns a weighted average rating out of 100 to reviews from mainstream publications, this release received an average score of 73, based on 5 reviews.

Writing for Clash, Ruby Carter described the album as "beautiful, explosive, and honest – and a stunning debut for Pretty Sick."

== Track listing ==
Makes Me Sick Makes Me Smile track listing
No.	Title	Length
1.	"Yeah You"	2:44
2.	"Drunk"	4:06
3.	"Human Condition"	3:50
4.	"Sober"	2:35
5.	"Heaven"	3:20
6.	"Black Tar"	2:57
7.	"Bound"	3:41
8.	"Lilith Song"	4:06
9.	"Dirty"	2:59
10.	"Self Fulfilling Prophecy"	3:49
11.	"Saturn Return"	3:25
12.	"PCP"	5:35
