= I Love to Lie =

Studio album by Lowertown
- Released: October 21, 2022
- Length: 40:44
- Label: Dirty Hit
- Producer: Catherine Marks

Lowertown chronology
The Gaping Mouth (2021)	I Love to Lie (2022)	Skin of My Teeth (2023)

Singles from I Love to Lie
- 1. "Bucktooth" Released: August 25, 2022; 2. "Antibiotics" Released: September 15, 2022; 3. "No Way" Released: October 6, 2022; 4. "My Friends" Released: October 21, 2022

I Love to Lie is the debut studio album by Atlanta duo Lowertown, released on October 21, 2022, by Dirty Hit. The album was recorded in London with Catherine Marks producing.

== Release ==
The album was announced on August 25, 2022, along with the release of lead single "Bucktooth" and a music video directed by Zev Megasis. Second single "Antibiotics" was released September 15, third single No Way released October 6, and the fourth single "My Friends" was released simultaneous with the album. The album was released on October 21, 2022, by Dirty Hit.

== Recording ==
Avsha Weinberg described his and his bandmate's recording process for the album as "worse" than that of their previous EP The Gaping Mouth. The duo recorded in London with Catherine Marks in the middle of Winter. Olivia Osby had just gone through a bad breakup, both members contracted COVID-19, and the longer recording process meant spending more time away from their newly adopted home in New York City.

== Style and reception ==
I Love to Lie ratings
Review scores
Source	Rating
Beats Per Minute	64%
DIY	5/5 stars
God Is in the TV	8/10
The Line of Best Fit	7/10

Beats Per Minute's Eddie Smith writes that there's "an excellent EP" in the album, "yet the surrounding misjudgments on I Love to Lie result in a record that frustrates and underwhelms." The album swaps the band's previous lo-fi sound for a more slick tone produced by Marks, and both member's lead vocals are "misused". Smith concludes by calling I Love to Lie "not a bad album by any standard, however, the abundance of unfulfilled potential overshadows its better moments". DIY's Sarah Jamieson calls the album a "melding pot of differing styles" which "acts as a potent journey through the band's psyche, hung together by the vulnerable lyricism that Olivia [Osby] has become known for." God Is in the TV included the album at 30 in their year-end top 50 albums ranking.

=== Influence ===
In an interview with Our Culture's Konstantinos Pappis, the duo mentioned inspirations for the album which included their bouts with illness, the 1970s and '80s New York punk scene, and the '80s films Down by Law and Paris, Texas.

== Track listing ==
All tracks are written by Avshalom Weinberg and Olivia Osby. All tracks produced by Catherine Marks and Lowertown..

I Love to Lie track listing
No.	Title	Length
1.	"My Friends"	3:29
2.	"Antibiotics"	3:07
3.	"Bucktooth"	3:30
4.	"I'm Not"	3:06
5.	"It's It's It's"	3:46
6.	"No Way"	4:45
7.	"Scum"	4:17
8.	"At the End"	3:20
9.	"Goon"	3:52
10.	"Waltz in Aflat Major"	3:55
11.	"It's Easy for Me"	3:37
Total length:		40:44

== Personnel ==
- Olivia Osby – lead vocals
- Avsha Weinberg – lead vocals
- Catherine Marks – producer
