= Space Cadet (EP) =

EP by Beabadoobee
- Released: October 14, 2019
- Genre: Indie rock; indie pop; pop rock; space rock
- Length: 19:48
- Label: Dirty Hit
- Producer: Joseph Rogers; Pete Robertson

Beabadoobee chronology
Loveworm (2019)	Space Cadet (2019)	Fake It Flowers (2020)

Singles from Space Cadet
- 1. "She Plays Bass" Released: 21 August 2019; 2. "I Wish I Was Stephen Malkmus" Released: 19 September 2019

Space Cadet is the fourth extended play (EP) by Filipino-born English singer-songwriter Beabadoobee. The EP was released on 14 October 2019 by independent record label Dirty Hit, and was supported by the singles "She Plays Bass" and "I Wish I Was Stephen Malkmus". All five tracks were executively produced by English musicians Pete Robertson (of the Vaccines) and Joseph Rodgers. The EP was also written entirely by Beabadoobee and features additional guitar from Matty Healy (of the 1975) on the title track.

== Background and release ==
Beabadoobee released "She Plays Bass" as the lead single on 21 August, before releasing the second single "I Wish I Was Stephen Malkmus" on 19 September. The latter is in reference to Stephen Malkmus of the band Pavement. Beabadoobee confessed to Nylon in early October that she hadn't formally announced the record but noted that "people know about it. I kind of say it here and there on a live show and then I guess like for [interviews], but I never properly said the name Space Cadet." Originally scheduled for release on 18 October 2019, Space Cadet arrived earlier on 14 October. It succeeds the EPs Lice (2018), Patched Up (2018) and Loveworm (2019). On the concept of the record, Erica Russel of Teen Vogue wrote, "aptly-titled Space Cadet finds the artist leaning heavily into the frustration of being misunderstood and the awkward uncertainty of inching closer towards adulthood. Over an emotive soundbed of fuzzy indie-rock, melancholic grunge, and breezy pop-rock, Bea reassures listeners that it’s okay not to fit in."

== Composition ==
The EP is musically performed in the genre of indie rock and indie pop. Erica Russel of Teen Vogue also wrote that the record features "an emotive soundbed of fuzzy indie-rock, melancholic grunge, and breezy pop-rock". All five tracks on Space Cadet were executively produced by Pete Robertson (former drummer of the Vaccines) and Joseph Rodgers. The title track also features additional guitar by labelmate Matthew Healy of the band the 1975 whom Beabadoobee would later support on their Music for Cars Tour.

== Critical reception ==
Professional ratings
Review scores
Source	Rating
Dork	5/5 stars
Exclaim!	8/10
The Line of Best Fit	8/10
NME	5/5 stars

Space Cadet was met with critical acclaim upon release. Thomas Smith of NME wrote noted that Space Cadet "builds on Bea’s astute songwriting and is a bold revolution for another bright young artist showing off Gen Z’s attitude to take something tried-and-tested and give it a new lease of life." He continued to note that "judging by this effort, she’s poised to become a hero in her own right." Stephen Ackroyd of Dork wrote that "from the word go, this is a fuller, more focused take on the template - scuzzy guitars and slacker pop perfection." Nicole DeMarco of i-D wrote that the EP contains "some of Bea’s most expansive work yet" and noted that the EP indicates her growth "from [a] bedroom artist to indie rock wunderkind." Harper Beattie of Atwood Magazine praised Space Cadet, writing that it "has artfully managed to offer a cohesive showcase of [her] range as a rising artist while incorporating the familiar outer space motif." Cady Siregar of The Line of Best Fit wrote that with the record, Beabadoobee "wears her heart on her sleeve, and she doesn’t care who sees it." Ian Gormely of Exclaim! noted that her ability to "spin emotional stakes out of such basic subject matter as her bass-playing bestie and love for '90s alt-rock" as well as "the sheer speed of her progression as a songwriter, suggest big things to come."

== Track listing ==
Space Cadet track listing
No.	Title	Length
1.	"Are You Sure"	4:04
2.	"I Wish I Was Stephen Malkmus"	3:52
3.	"Sun More Often"	4:01
4.	"She Plays Bass"	3:27
5.	"Space Cadet"	4:24
Total length:		19:48

== Charts ==
Chart performance for Space Cadet
Chart (2019)	Peak position
UK Independent Album Breakers (OCC)	14
