= This Is How Tomorrow Moves =

2024 studio album by Beabadoobee

Studio album by Beabadoobee
- Released: 9 August 2024
- Studios: Shangri-La (Los Angeles); Lucy's Meat Market (Los Angeles); Narcissus (London); Abbey Road (London); Tamarind (Los Angeles); Apple Rock (East Sussex)
- Genre: Indie rock
- Length: 41:23
- Label: Dirty Hit
- Producers: Jacob Bugden; Rick Rubin

Beabadoobee chronology
Beatopia (2022)	This Is How Tomorrow Moves (2024)	Pylon (2026)

Singles from This Is How Tomorrow Moves
- 1. "Take a Bite" Released: 9 May 2024; 2. "Coming Home" Released: 5 June 2024; 3. "Ever Seen" Released: 1 July 2024; 4. "Beaches" Released: 7 August 2024; 5. "Real Man" Released: 17 January 2025

This Is How Tomorrow Moves is the third studio album by Filipino and English singer and songwriter Beabadoobee. It was released by English independent label Dirty Hit on 9 August 2024. It features the singles "Take a Bite", "Coming Home", "Ever Seen", and "Beaches". “Real Man” was later released as the album’s fifth single. The album debuted at number one on the UK Albums Chart, making it her first to do so.

== Background and composition ==
Beabadoobee had released two studio albums since 2020. With the release of This Is How Tomorrow Moves at age 24, critics started calling it her first "adult" album. The singer pivoted to new themes, moving away from the teenage angst on her previous records. It is primarily an indie rock record which incorporates dream pop and indie-pop heavily influenced by the early 2000s.

== Release ==
On 9 May 2024, Beabadoobee released the album's lead single "Take a Bite" to moderate commercial success, peaking at number 68 on the UK Singles chart. She also announced a North American tour, starting in Philadelphia on 8 September 2024 and concluding in Los Angeles on 28 September 2024. On 5 June 2024, she released the album's second single, "Coming Home." On 11 June 2024, she announced a United Kingdom tour in support of the album, starting in Glasgow on 11 November 2024 and concluding in London on 21 November 2024. On 1 July 2024, the album's third single, "Ever Seen" was released. The album's final single, "Beaches" was released on 7 August 2024.

== Critical reception ==
Professional ratings
Aggregate scores
Source	Rating
AnyDecentMusic?	7.6/10
Metacritic	80/100
Review scores
Source	Rating
The Arts Desk	4/5 stars
Clash	8/10
The Independent	4/5 stars
The Line of Best Fit	8/10
NME	4/5 stars
The Observer	4/5 stars
Pitchfork	7.4/10
Rolling Stone	4/5 stars
The Skinny	3/5 stars
Slant Magazine	3.5/5 stars

According to the review aggregator Metacritic, This Is How Tomorrow Moves received "generally favorable reviews" based on a weighted average score of 80 out of 100 from 17 critic scores. Aggregator AnyDecentMusic? gave it 7.6 out of 10, based on their assessment of the critical consensus.

Ciaran Picker of Dork described the album as "remarkably assured." Writing for The Skinny, Oscar Lund wrote that the album was "sentimental", "emotive", and "infectiously catchy" but also "a little too safe, [...] generic, and reserved." Maya Georgi of Rolling Stone praised the album's production, writing: "Thanks to the help of Rubin’s attentive production style, the album ventures into new territory but makes it feel worn-in." Reviewing for Slant Magazine, Jeremy Winograd wrote that the album's hooks "practically creep up on you before they burrow their way into your brain." Ashley Bardhan of Pitchfork wrote that the album "sometimes douses its introspection in unnecessary syrup." Writing for The Observer Kitty Empire described the album as "well-produced, beautifully played, elegantly arranged." Writing for The Guardian, Kitty Empire stated "Post, for one, takes a Taylor Swift-ish pop song and runs it through a 'zoomergaze' filter – zoomergaze being the latest iteration of My Bloody Valentine's influence as refracted by the internet."

== Track listing ==
All tracks are written by Beatrice Laus.

This Is How Tomorrow Moves track listing
No.	Title	Length
1.	"Take a Bite"	2:38
2.	"California"	2:52
3.	"One Time"	3:05
4.	"Real Man"	2:39
5.	"Tie My Shoes"	2:58
6.	"Girl Song"	3:57
7.	"Coming Home"	2:15
8.	"Ever Seen"	3:23
9.	"A Cruel Affair"	2:31
10.	"Post"	2:41
11.	"Beaches"	3:50
12.	"Everything I Want"	3:09
13.	"The Man Who Left Too Soon"	1:49
14.	"This Is How It Went"	3:36
Total length:		41:23

== Personnel ==
Musicians

- Beatrice Laus – vocals, guitar
- Jacob Bugden – vocals, guitar, bass, keyboards, programming, drums
- Jason Lader – bass, programming
- Eliana Sewell – bass
- Luca Caruso – drums, percussion, keyboards
- Carla Azar – drums, percussion
- Abe Rounds – drums, percussion
- Will Graefe – guitar
- CJ Camerieri – horns
- Benny Bock – keyboards

Technical

- Rick Rubin – production
- Jacob Bugden – production, engineering
- Joe LaPorta – mastering
- Oli Jacobs – mixing, engineering
- Ben Baptie – mixing
- Jason Lader – engineering
- Callum Waddington – engineering
- Robin Schmidt – vinyl mastering
- Michael Nolasco – additional engineering
- Fraser Latimer – mixing assistance
- Jack Manning – mixing assistance
- Liv Painter – engineering assistance
- Tyler Harris – engineering assistance
- Jozef Caldwell – engineering assistance
- Fred Williams – engineering assistance
- Joey Miller – engineering assistance

Visuals

- Patricia Villirillo – creative direction
- Chris Melian – art, design
- Samuel Burgess-Johnson – art, design
- Jules Moskovtchenko – photography

== Charts ==
Chart performance for This Is How Tomorrow Moves
Chart (2024)	Peak position
Australian Albums (ARIA)	6
Belgian Albums (Ultratop Flanders)	53
Canadian Albums (Billboard)	71
Dutch Albums (Album Top 100)	71
Irish Albums (Official Charts)	29
Portuguese Albums (AFP)	48
Scottish Albums (Official Charts)	1
UK Albums (Official Charts)	1
UK Independent Albums (Official Charts)	1
US Billboard 200	34
US Independent Albums (Billboard)	6
US Top Rock & Alternative Albums (Billboard)	10

== Certifications ==
Certifications for This Is How Tomorrow Moves
Region	Certification	Certified units/sales
United Kingdom (BPI)	Silver	60,000^{‡}
^{‡} Sales+streaming figures based on certification alone.

== Release history ==
Release dates and formats for This Is How Tomorrow Moves
Region	Date	Format(s)	Version	Label	Ref.
Various	9 August 2024	Cassette; CD; streaming; vinyl LP	Standard; Sea Glass	Dirty Hit	
