= Been Stellar =

Indie rock band from New York City, USA

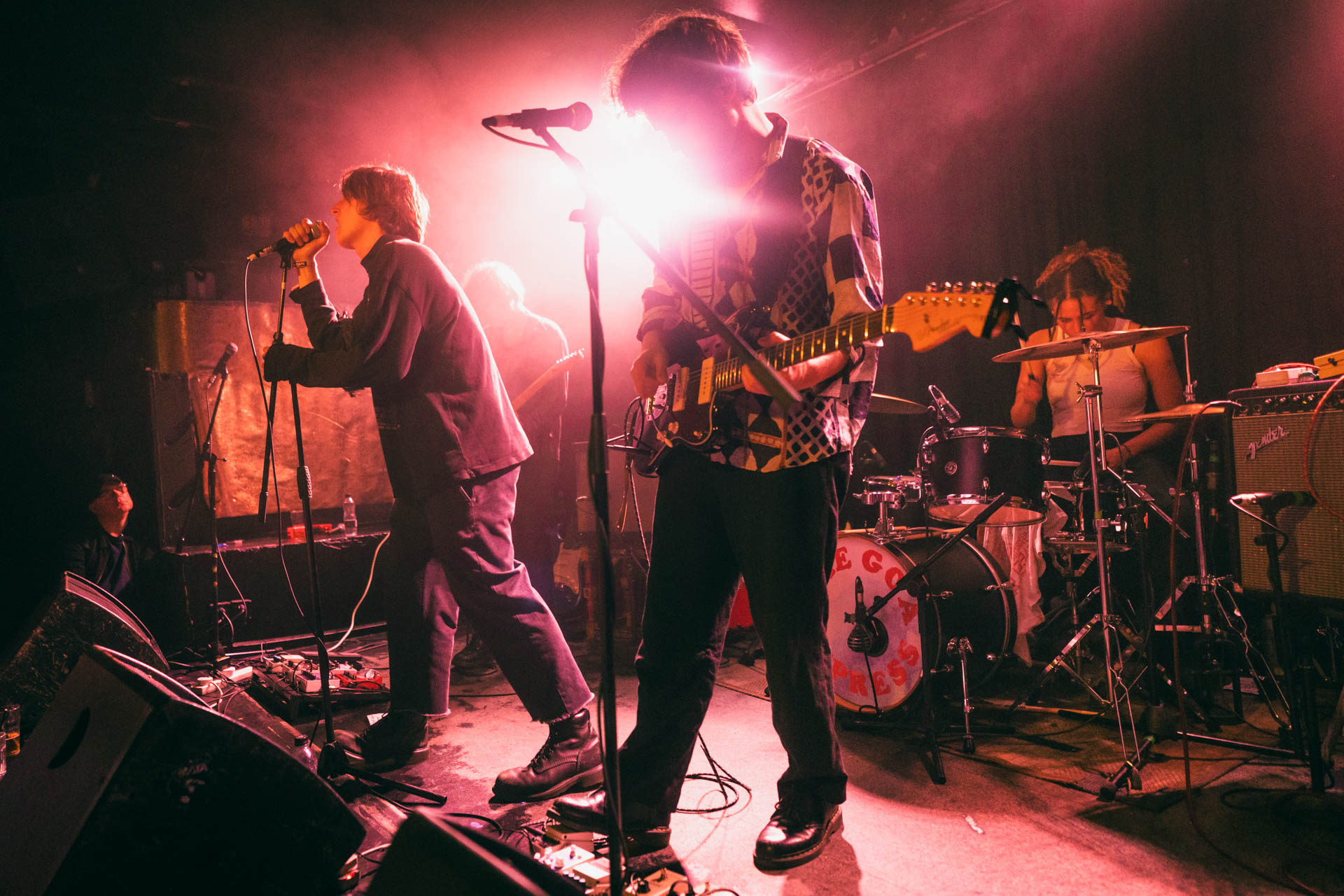
- Been Stellar performing

Background information
- Origin: New York City, United States
- Genre: Indie rock
- Years active: 2014–present
- Label: Dirty Hit
- Members: Sam Slocum, Skyler Knapp, Nico Brunstein, Gigi Giobbi
- Website: beenstellar.com

Been Stellar is an American indie rock band based in New York City. The band is currently signed to Dirty Hit. The group released their debut album in 2024 on Dirty Hit, titled Scream from New York, NY. The album received praise as an outstanding indie rock debut record.

== Career ==
=== 2014-2022: Early Years ===
Sam Slocum and Skyler Knapp formed the band in 2014 at their high school in Michigan. The pair moved to New York City as first-year students at New York University. The band is named after American actor Ben Stiller.

In 2017, Been Stellar released their first LP titled, "Sells Out" on Bandcamp.

In 2022, Been Stellar released their self-titled EP, which features tracks such as "Manhattan Youth" and "Kids 1995."

=== 2023-present: Scream From New York, NY ===
In June 2023, the band announced their debut album, Scream From New York, NY, which was released on 21 June 2024. The album was produced by Dan Carey, a seasoned producer who has worked with bands such as Fontaines D.C., Wet Leg, and Squid. The album received mostly positive reviews.

The band has toured with other groups and has opened for notable bands and artists such as Fontaines DC, Shame, Interpol, The 1975, Beabadoobee, Inhaler and Alexandros.

== Musical style and influences ==
Been Stellar is recognized as a indie rock band. Their music has been described as a blend of post-punk and shoegaze, and a music that balances noisy tones with pop melodies.

Like most of their contemporaries on the New York rock scene, the band members said they were influenced by New York acts such as The Velvet Underground, Television, Sonic Youth, The Strokes, Interpol, LCD Soundsystem, Yeah Yeah Yeahs, Bowery Electric, La Monte Young and DIIV. Shoegaze acts like My Bloody Valentine, The Jesus and Mary Chain or Ride also influenced their music, and artists like Car Seat Headrest, Just Mustard, Portishead and Tricky were mentioned too.

Lyrically Ezra Koenig, Allen Ginsberg, Morrissey and Modern Baseball were mentioned as main influences.

== Band members ==
=== Current members ===
- Sam Slocum - lead vocals, tambourine (2014–present); guitar (2024–present)
- Skyler Knapp - guitar (2014–present)
- Nico Brunstein - bass guitar (2017–present)
- Gigi Giobbi - drums (2025–present)

=== Past members ===
- Dominic Gould - bass (2014–2017)
- Miles Camiener - drums (2014–2017)
- Michael Lynch - guitar (2014–2017)
- Laila Wayans - drums (2018–2024)
- Nando Dale - guitar (2018–2024)
- Harrison Li - guitar (2024–2025)

=== Touring Members ===
- Ally Sianga - guitar (2025–present)

Timeline

== Discography ==
Studio albums

- Sells Out (self-released, 2017)
- Scream from New York, NY (Dirty Hit, 2024)

=== EPs ===
- Nihilist (2020)
- Been Stellar (2022)
- Breakaway EP (2025)

=== Live Albums ===
- Been Stellar on Audiotree Live (2023)
