= The Perfect Pair =

2022 song by Beabadoobee

Single by Beabadoobee

from the album Beatopia
- Released: 26 September 2022
- Genre: Bossa nova; guitar pop
- Length: 2:58
- Label: Dirty Hit
- Songwriters: Beatrice Laus; Jacob Bugden
- Producers: Beatrice Laus; Jacob Bugden; Iain Berryman

Beabadoobee singles chronology
"10:36" (2022)	"The Perfect Pair" (2022)	"Glue Song" (2023)

"The Perfect Pair" is a song by Filipino-British singer Beabadoobee. It was written by Jacob Bugden and Beabadoobee, and became available as the fifth track from her second studio album Beatopia (2022) on 15 July 2022. It was later sent to adult alternative radio on 26 September 2022 as a single by Dirty Hit. Sonically, "The Perfect Pair" is a bossa nova song backed by '90s-style guitar pop. The lyrics detail two lovers' romantic distrust and uncertainty at the end of a relationship.

== Release and composition ==
"The Perfect Pair" was sent to adult alternative radio on 26 September 2022. The song is 2 minutes and 58 seconds at a tempo of 146 BPM. The song went viral on the video sharing platform TikTok upon its release.

The song was described by The Line of Best Fit as a swingy guitar and bossa nova song that addresses romantic distrust and uncertainty.

== Critical reception ==
Pitchfork's Arielle Gordon described the song as "shimmying bossa nova" and compared it to the likes of Corinne Bailey Rae. Steffanie Wang of Nylon described it as "at once familiar and a sonic mesh of new ideas".

== Live performances ==
Beabadoobee performed the album version of the song at a Tiny Desk Concert on 29 November 2022.

Beabadoobee performed an acoustic rendition of the song on The Tonight Show Starring Jimmy Fallon on 5 December 2022. Wearing an oversized coat, short skirt, and knee-high white boots, she was accompanied by guitarists, violinists, cellists, and drummers. The performance was met with positive reception. Alex Gonzales of Uproxx noted her vocals as "soft and silky", and Hypebeast's Sarah Kearns said she "delivered the soft lyrics with effortless, breathy ease".

== Credits and personnel ==
Credits are adapted from the liner notes of Beatopia.

- Jacob Bugden – producer, engineer, songwriter
- Beabadoobee – lead vocals, background vocals, songwriter, vocal producer
- Iain Berryman – songwriter, producer
- Drew Dungate-Smith – engineer,
- Joe LaPorta – mastering
- Ben Baptie – mixing
- Sophie Ellis – assistant mixing

== Charts ==
Chart performance for "The Perfect Pair"
Chart (2024–2025)	Peak position
UK Singles (Official Charts)	89
US Hot Rock & Alternative Songs (Billboard)	19

== Certifications ==
Region	Certification	Certified units/sales
New Zealand (RMNZ)	Platinum	30,000^{‡}
United Kingdom (BPI)	Gold	400,000^{‡}
United States (RIAA)	2× Platinum	2,000,000^{‡}
^{‡} Sales+streaming figures based on certification alone.
