= Tarantula (Faithless song) =

"Crazy English Summer / Tarantula"
- Australian CD1 Cover

Single by Faithless

from the album Outrospective
- Released: 17 December 2001 (UK)
- Recorded: 2001
- Genre: Trance
- Length: 3:05
- Label: Cheeky Records
- Songwriters: Maxi Jazz, Sister Bliss, Rollo
- Producer: Rollo

Faithless singles chronology
"Muhammad Ali" (2001)	"Crazy English Summer" / "'Tarantula" (2001)	"One Step Too Far" (2002)

"Tarantula" is a song by British group Faithless. It was released in December 2001 as the third single from their third studio album Outrospective. The song reached number 29 in UK Singles Chart. It was Used as an Intro for BBC's 2002 FIFA World Cup broadcast.

== Track listing ==
=== UK CD1 ===
1. Tarantula (Radio Edit) [Radio Mix] - 03:05
2. Tarantula (Rollo & Sister Bliss Funky As F*** Mix) - 08:28
3. Tarantula (Tiësto Remix) [Edit] - 08:20

=== UK CD2 ===
1. Tarantula (Radio Edit) [Radio Mix] - 03:05
2. Tarantula (Rollo & Sister Bliss Big Mix) - 07:20
3. Tarantula (Hiver & Hammer Remix) - 07:03

=== Australian CD1 ===
1. Crazy English Summer (DJ Aloé Remix) - 03:52
2. Tarantula (Radio Edit) - 03:05
3. Tarantula (Rollo & Sister Bliss Funky Mix) - 08:27
4. Tarantula (Subtech Remix) - 09:05
5. Muhammad Ali (Oliver Lieb Remix) - 07:10

=== Australian CD2 ===
1. Crazy English Summer (Aloé Radio Edit) - 03:52
2. Tarantula (Radio Edit) - 03:05
3. Tarantula (Tiësto Remix) - 09:19
4. Tarantula (Hiver & Hammer Remix) - 07:02
5. Crazy English Summer (Aloé Extended Remix) - 06:03

=== German CD1 ===
1. Tarantula (Radio Edit) - 03:19
2. Tarantula (Rollo & Sister Bliss Funky As F*** Mix) - 08:29
3. Tarantula (Tiësto Remix) - 09:21
4. Tarantula (Subtech Mix) - 09:06

=== German CD2 ===
1. Tarantula (Radio Edit) - 03:19
2. Tarantula (Rollo & Sister Bliss Big Mix) - 07:19
3. Tarantula (Hiver & Hammer Remix) - 07:03
4. Crazy English Summer (DJ Aloé Remix) - 03:50

=== Danish Release ===
1. Crazy English Summer (Album Version) - 02:44
2. Crazy English Summer (DJ Aloé Remix) - 03:52
3. Crazy English Summer (Extended Remix) [DJ Aloé] - 06:03
4. Tarantula (Radio Edit) - 03:18

== Chart positions ==
Chart (2001–2002)	Peak position
Belgium (Ultratop 50 Flanders)	49
Belgium (Ultratop Flanders Dance)	7
Belgium (Ultratip Bubbling Under Wallonia)	3
Belgium (Ultratop Wallonia Dance)	7
Finland (Suomen virallinen lista)	18
Germany (GfK)	92
Netherlands (Dutch Top 40)	14
Netherlands (Single Top 100)	53
Scotland Singles (Official Charts)	31
Switzerland (Schweizer Hitparade)	89
UK Dance (Official Charts)	27
UK Singles (Official Charts)	29
