= Untitled (halo) =

American alternative rock band

- Origin: Los Angeles, U.S.
- Years active: 2022–present
- Label: Dirty Hit
- Members: Nick Noneman; Ariana Mamnoon; Jack Dione; Jay Are
- Website: untitledhalo.com

Untitled (halo) is an alternative rock band based in Los Angeles.

== History ==
Untitled (halo) formed in Los Angeles, California in 2022. The band's name originates from American artist Edward Ruscha's 1986 painting Aurora. The band's members all met between 2021 and 2022. The band's sound has been compared to the likes of Warpaint and Bar Italia.

The band's first release was their self-released single "El Prado Freestyle" in February 2023 which came from the band's first session together, recording as a trio at the time. Months later, in September 2023, the band self-released their first EP, Towncryer. The following year, the band self-released a second EP, Headbanger, in November 2024.

The band released their debut self-titled album on November 6, 2026 on British label Dirty Hit. The album was recorded in Noneman's studio in Glassel Park, Los Angeles. The album received mixed reviews from critics, with Pitchfork giving the album a 5.8/10, noting the change in the band's sound, "With an ocean of bands currently working in similar territory as this, it’s refreshing to hear these dream-poppy guitars and Y2K drum samples get some studio oomph". In their review of the album, Paste commented, "The LA band’s first record has promising high points that get lost in a fragmented, often directionless tracklist". Under the Radar gave the album a more positive 7/10 review, commenting, "Written during a period of personal upheaval and isolation, the album finds the four-piece attempting to turn those feelings into something tangible, with varying degrees of success".

== Discography ==
=== Studio albums ===
- Untitled (halo) (2026)

=== Extended plays ===
- Towncryer (2023)
- Headbanger (2024)

=== Singles ===
- "El Prado Freestyle" (2023)
- "Limewire" (2023)
- "Spiral" (2023)
- "sKill isSue" (2024)
- "Negative Fantasy" (with RIP Swirl) (2024)
- "That's Honey" (2024)
- "Blunt Subconscious" (2024)
- "Eyes Full of Tears / Doomcomplex" (with Voyeur) (2025)
- "Aimee Lou Wood Freestyle" (2026)
- "Easy Rider" (2026)
- "Sex" (2026)
