= Muhammad Ali (song) =

Single by Faithless

from the album Outrospective
- Released: 23 September 2001
- Genre: Trip hop, electronica, downtempo
- Length: 17:00 (CD1); 15:08 (CD2)
- Label: Cheeky Records/BMG
- Songwriters: Rollo Armstrong, Maxwell Fraser, Ayalah Deborah Bentovim
- Producer: Rollo

Faithless singles chronology
"We Come 1" (2001)	"Muhammad Ali" (2001)	"Crazy English Summer" / "Tarantula" (2001)

Alternative cover

"Muhammad Ali" is a song recorded by British dance band Faithless. It was released in the UK as a single on 23 September 2001, and was the second single release from the group's third studio album Outrospective. The German release was a DualDisc containing a CD audio side and a DVD side. Muhammad Ali reached #29 in the UK singles chart.

The single is about one of Maxi Jazz's heroes and major influences Muhammad Ali, who inspired Maxi to believe in himself and rise above racial taunts when he was younger.

One of the single covers contains a section of a picture from the Ali vs. Liston fight after Ali had knocked Liston to the floor.

== Track listings ==
=== UK CD1 ===
1. Muhammad Ali (Radio Edit) - 03:31
2. Muhammad Ali (Rollo & Sister Bliss Sweet Love Mix) - 07:18
3. Muhammad Ali (Full Intention Club Mix) - 06:11

=== UK CD2 ===
1. Muhammad Ali (Radio Edit) - 03:31
2. Muhammad Ali (Architechs Remix) - 05:22
3. Muhammad Ali (Inland Knights Alley Mix) - 06:15

=== EU/Australian ===
1. Muhammad Ali (Radio Edit) - 03:31
2. Muhammad Ali (Full Intention Club Remix) - 06:08
3. Muhammad Ali (Inland Knights Alley Mix) - 06:14
4. Muhammad Ali (Rollo & Sister Bliss Sweet Love Mix) - 07:18
5. Muhammad Ali (Architechs Remix) - 05:39

=== German DualDisc Single ===
==== Side 1: CD Audio ====
1. Muhammad Ali (Radio Edit) - 03:31
2. Muhammad Ali (Full Intention Club Remix) - 06:08
3. Muhammad Ali (Inland Knights Alley Mix) - 06:14
4. Muhammad Ali (Rollo & Sister Bliss Sweet Love Mix) - 07:18
5. Muhammad Ali (Architechs Remix) - 05:22
6. Muhammad Ali (Rollo & Sister Bliss Tuff Love Mix) - 07:33

==== Side 2: Video ====
1. Muhammad Ali [Video, Stereo and AC3 5.1 Mix] - 04:04
2. Muhammad Ali (Live) [Video] - 04:47
3. Muhammad Ali (Rollo & Sister Bliss Tuff Love Mix) [Video] - 07:33
4. Behind The Scenes [Promo-Video for "Outrospective" including history and interviews, shot around Early 2001] - 12:28
5. We Come 1 [Video] - 04:03

== Chart positions ==
Chart (2001)	Peak position
Belgium (Ultratip Bubbling Under Flanders)	4
Belgium (Ultratip Bubbling Under Wallonia)	8
Germany (GfK)	87
Netherlands (Single Top 100)	55
Scotland Singles (OCC)	37
Sweden (Sverigetopplistan)	89
UK Dance (OCC)	11
UK Singles (OCC)	29
