= Glue Song =

2023 single by Beabadoobee

- Clairo remix cover

Single by Beabadoobee
- Released: February 14, 2023
- Recorded: 2022
- Genre: Chamber pop
- Length: 2:15
- Label: Dirty Hit
- Songwriter: Beatrice Laus
- Producers: Jacob Bugden; Iain Berryman

Beabadoobee singles chronology
"The Perfect Pair" (2022)	"Glue Song" (2023)	"The Way Things Go" (2023)

Music Video
- "Glue Song" on YouTube

"Glue Song" is a song by the Filipino-British singer Beabadoobee. The chamber pop ballad was produced by Jacob Bugden and Iain Berryman and released on February 14, 2023, through Dirty Hit.

A music video for the song was released along with the single. A remix with Clairo was released on April 17, 2023. The song has charted in several countries.

== Background and release ==
The song was released on Valentine's Day.

I wrote a lot of this song while on tour across Australia and Asia in the back of cars and traveling. It’s a heartfelt song that means a lot to me.... A love song and the first one I've written in my new relationship. I usually write these songs that are sad, in the past with my writing even when it doesn’t sound sad looking back, the lyrics usually have been. For the first time this is just me being really happy. I'm in a really positive place for the first time in a long time and feeling love. We recorded the song with my guitarist and producer Jacob [Bugden] in his house and added in trumpets and strings. This song feels really personal and I went to my home town in Iloilo to film the music video. It’s where I was born and so that also added another personal touch to the song.

— Beabadoobee to Pitchfork in February 2023.

== Composition and lyrics ==
Musically, the song is a chamber pop ballad with slow and sensual guitars, with strings in the background. The beginning of the song experienced rotation and semi-virality on TikTok before its release after it was teased months prior by the singer in a Tiny Desk Concert in November 2022, in the snippet she sings, "I've never known someone like you/Tangled in love stuck by you/From the glue." (Note: The choir version conducted by Alex Robinson was released for Amazon Music UK, it features the same chamber pop sound but in spatial audio and a children's choir.)

== Critical reception ==
The song was well received by critics. The Gryphon's Emie Grimwood wrote that the song introduces a new era for her music in a beautiful way, further writing that other return with a statement of love and gratitude, while also paying homage to the city she grew up in, calling it "touching and unflawed." Chris Deville of Stereogum called it a love song, one that takes listeners back to the acoustic sound of her past releases, continuing stating that at this point in her career she can spring for an elegant string section to flesh it out, though.

== Music video ==
The video was directed by her boyfriend Jake Erland and shot on 16mm film. She is seen hanging around with her family and her love interest Erland in her home town of Iloilo City in the Philippines. As of June 2025, it has over 44 million views on YouTube.

== Credits and personnel ==
Glue Song (Clairo remix) (Note: The original includes the same people except for Clairo.)

- Jacob Bugden – producer
- Beabadoobee – lead vocals, background vocals, songwriter
- Iain Berryman – producer
- Claire Cottrill – songwriter

Glue Song Choir Version (Amazon Music) (Note: A choir version was released for Amazon Music UK, it features the same chamber pop sound but in spatial audio and a children's choir.)

- Alex Robinson – engineer, mixing
- Mike Hillern – engineer, mastering

== Charts ==
Chart performance for "Glue Song"
Chart (2023)	Peak position
Canada Hot 100 (Billboard)	75
Ireland (IRMA)	56
Japan Hot Overseas (Billboard Japan)	13
New Zealand Hot Singles (RMNZ)	11
UK Singles (Official Charts)	38
UK Independent (Official Charts)	7
US Bubbling Under Hot 100 (Billboard)	13
US Hot Rock & Alternative Songs (Billboard)	12

== Certifications ==
Region	Certification	Certified units/sales
New Zealand (RMNZ)	Platinum	30,000^{‡}
United Kingdom (BPI)	Gold	400,000^{‡}
United States (RIAA)	2× Platinum	2,000,000^{‡}
^{‡} Sales+streaming figures based on certification alone.
