= Fake It Flowers =

Studio album by Beabadoobee
- Released: 16 October 2020
- Studios: DH00270 (London); Urchin (London)
- Genres: Alternative rock; indie rock; grunge; shoegaze; pop-punk; bubblegrunge
- Length: 40:56
- Label: Dirty Hit
- Producers: Pete Robertson; Joseph Rogers

Beabadoobee chronology
Space Cadet (2019)	Fake It Flowers (2020)	Our Extended Play (2021)

Singles from Fake It Flowers
- 1. "Care" Released: 14 July 2020; 2. "Sorry" Released: 6 August 2020; 3. "Worth It" Released: 8 September 2020; 4. "How Was Your Day?" Released: 28 September 2020; 5. "Together" Released: 13 October 2020

Fake It Flowers is the debut studio album by Filipino and English singer and songwriter Beabadoobee. It was released under English independent label Dirty Hit on 16 October 2020. Continuing the departure from her previous lo-fi bedroom pop sound initiated on Space Cadet, Fake It Flowers is a more guitar-driven album which recalls "'90s slacker rock" and alternative rock. Beabadoobee announced the release of the album in mid-July 2020 and supported it with the singles "Care", "Sorry", "Worth It", "How Was Your Day?" and "Together". She embarked on a headlining tour of the United Kingdom and Ireland to support the album in 2021.

== Background and release ==
In early 2020, Beabadoobee achieved international commercial success for the first time in her career after her 2017 single "Coffee" was prominently sampled in Canadian rapper Powfu's 2019 single "Death Bed". The song peaked in the top 20 charts of over 27 countries, and earned Beabadoobee her first platinum certification in the United States, United Kingdom, Australia, and New Zealand.

Amid the international hype over "Death Bed", Beabadoobee announced Fake It Flowers on 14 July 2020 and released the lead single and album opener "Care". For the Apple Music At Home Sessions, she performed an acoustic version of "Care" as well as a cover version of Daniel Johnston's "Walking the Cow". Beabadoobee announced the release of the album's next single, "Sorry", in early August, and released it alongside its music video a few days later on 5 August 2020. With this release, Beabadoobee revealed the album's track listing, cover art and official release date. Before releasing the third single, "Worth It", Beabadoobee announced a headlining tour of the United Kingdom and Ireland to support the album in late 2021. On 28 September, she released the single "How Was Your Day?" alongside its music video. Beabadoobee released "Together" as the fifth and final single on 13 October 2020.

== Recording and concept ==
Beabadoobee told i-D, "Fake It Flowers is pretty much my whole life in one album." On the album's namesake she said "I recorded my demos on my phone and for some reason they all saved as 'Fake It Flowers', and I was like, 'Oh! That's a cool name!' So I figured I may as well just call the album that! [...] I got kind of obsessed with flowers actually, especially when filming the video for 'Care' and doing the whole creative side with my boyfriend." The record was recorded with Pete Robertson of the Vaccines and Irish studio engineer Joseph Rodgers, both of whom recorded Beabadoobee's last project Space Cadet (2019).

Lyrically, the album contains "intense feeling and emotion", as well in addition to what Will Hodgkinson of The Times described as "catchy songs about the concerns of youth". It explores Beabadoobee's experiences with self-harm, childhood trauma, her romantic relationship with her boyfriend, and using "hair dye as [a method of] empowerment". Beabadoobee occasionally called on labelmate Matty Healy of English rock band the 1975 for lyrical assistance.

== Songs and composition ==
Fake It Flowers is primarily performed in the genre of alternative rock (or "alt-rock"), as well as indie rock (or "slacker rock"), and therefore extensively features the electric guitar. Many critics drew comparisons to the "'90s slacker rock" (or "'90s indie rock") which heavily influenced Beabadoobee. The record was also described musically as "bubblegrunge" (a mixture of bubblegum music and grunge). Chris DeVille of Stereogum wrote that Fake It Flowers' "dreamy blend of grunge, shoegaze, Britpop, emo, and other guitar-powered Clinton-era subgenres is consistently entertaining and occasionally transcendent." Lucy Shanker of Consequence of Sound felt that Beabadoobee "channel[ed] the '90s with powerful pop-punk songs". Ryley Remedios of Exclaim! noted that the album "aims to blur the genre barrier between '90s garage rock and lo-fi pop". Lizzie Manno of Paste wrote that "most of the songs on Fake It Flowers center on a hi-fi, textured rock sound with anthemic choruses."

Sophie Williams of NME gave the album's lead single "Care" four out of five stars and described it as an "arena-baiting alt-rock stomper from Gen Z guitar hero". Alicia Bugallo of Atwood Magazine noted that in the song, Beabadoobee "adopts a grungier sound, featuring straight drums, guitar riffs and gripping vocals" rather than "the lo-fi bedroom pop" she is known for. Bugallo also wrote that the song sees Beabadoobee "get raw" with her lyricism, "getting honest about what she has been through, and confronting those who have caused her pain, or have failed to listen to her when she needed a shoulder to cry on. It shows [her] vulnerability but, on the other hand, it also illustrates her courage and independence."

The album's second single "Sorry" was described by Jade Boren of Hollywood Life as a "perfect example" of Beabadoobee's "adeptness at combining angst and angelic vocals to create alternative rock bangers", noting that she enters an "even darker territory" than on the lead single "Care" because "instead of romance, this new track focuses on a dying friendship". The album's third single "Worth It" was described by James Rettig of Stereogum as "a chugging and compressed track about not wanting to fall back into bad relationship patterns." Peter Helman of Stereogum described "Together" as "a sticky, melodic rocker that explodes into its satisfyingly crunchy chorus."

== Critical reception ==
Professional ratings
Aggregate scores
Source	Rating
AnyDecentMusic?	7.6/10
Metacritic	81/100
Review scores
Source	Rating
AllMusic	4/5 stars
Clash	8/10
Consequence of Sound	B+
DIY	4/5 stars
Evening Standard	4/5 stars
Exclaim!	8/10
The Independent	4/5 stars
The Line of Best Fit	9/10
MusicOMH	4/5 stars
NME	5/5 stars
Pitchfork	6.4/10

Fake It Flowers received critical acclaim from music critics. At Metacritic, which assigns a normalised rating out of 100 to reviews from mainstream critics, the album has an average score of 81 based on 18 reviews, indicating "universal acclaim". Album of the Year collected 21 reviews and calculated an average of 78 out of 100. Aggregator AnyDecentMusic? gave it 7.6 out of 10, based on their assessment of the critical consensus. A more critical review from Pitchfork rated the album a 6.4 out of 10: "Fake It Flowers is an album of vibes: It uses the slanted melodies and flannel-loving aesthetics of alternative rock in service of pop hooks that are almost impressively simplistic and repetitive."

Thomas Smith of NME rated the record five out of five stars and wrote that the "journey from bedroom pop hero to bonafide rock star is completed in bruising fashion on the Londoner's stunning debut album of anthemic slacker rock." Robin Murray of Clash described Fake it Flowers as "a real pearl of a record" and "an instant classic debut album" which "runs on unmitigated confidence" and is "revealing, enthralling [and] enchanting". Ben Devlin of musicOMH also described the record as "a very well-accomplished debut, featuring a consistent, enjoyable style, a fully-formed persona and catchy tunes which speak to the head and heart." Mikael Woods of Los Angeles Times wrote that the album is "full of fuzzy-catchy '90s-style guitar jams". Marianne Eloise of Louder Sound noted that "with its acoustic guitars and fuzzy production, [Fake It Flowers] has retained the DIY feel of Beabadoobee's earlier tracks," while noting that throughout the record she "experiment[s] with heavier sounds". Because of "its ability to fuse pensive elation, sugary guitar charge, and sweet pop melodies", Jon Dolan of Rolling Stone compared the record to American Thighs (1994) by Veruca Salt and Totally Crushed Out (1995) by That Dog. Ryley Remedios of Exclaim! wrote that the album "aims to blur the genre barrier between '90s garage rock and lo-fi pop, finding her on the cusp of breaking into mainstream radio while remaining a budding rock star in her own right." Remedios noted that the record was "fuelled by her love for Britpop" and that it "carries a deep nostalgia for that era of grunge, chipped vinyl and vintage threads," while writing that its "songs sound like they were recorded while rocking out with her friends in the garage with a no-fucks-given attitude toward music — and it works." Emily Bootle of New Statesman praised Beabadoobee and described her as "an old-fashioned formidable talent" who "proves her talent with complex songwriting that goes deeper than a new millennium aesthetic". Bootle also described the album as "a near-flawless record of Y2K nostalgia" which "perfectly captures both past and future." Charlotte Croft of The Line of Best Fit also described Beabadoobee as "a beacon of nostalgia for '90s kids" and that "the true essence of who [she] is is here to stay, taking us back to simpler times, adorned with mohair knits and baggy jeans." Susan Darlington of Loud and Quiet highlighted her influences of bands such as Pavement and Pixies throughout the record and drew slight resemblance to Giant Drag and Belly in their King era. Heather Phares of AllMusic also drew slight comparisons to the Sundays and the Cranberries on different tracks throughout the record, and concluded that Beabadoobee's "gift for distilling complex emotions into relatable songs is just as vital to [her] music as her rapidly evolving sound, and both shine on Fake It Flowers."

James Ayles of Gigwise described the album as "a very polished effort that only begins to hint at the potential of the young woman wielding the guitar", emphasising that "having come from writing in her bedroom to debut record in swift order, it feels like there is plenty more to come from Beabadoobee." In a slightly more negative review, Zoë Andrea-Lykourgou of Vinyl Chapters opposed this statement, writing that Fake It Flowers "demonstrates a development for Beabadoobee since her 'Coffee' days, but it's clear she still has a long way to go."

Beabadoobee is at her best when serving up exquisite pop songs in rock trappings, matching sweetly sung melodies with a surging, shimmering wall of guitars. The first two songs on the album, "Care" and "Worth It", are both a breathless rush, so dynamic and immaculately produced that they seem to document a real-time transformation from bedroom pop to arena rock. Perhaps an even more impressive achievement is "Sorry", a crashing, symphonically infused power ballad about teenage indiscretions that, in keeping with the weight of adolescent emotions, impacts like a sky full of meteors careening toward the same destination. Beabadoobee's star, on the other hand, is on the rise. It will be interesting to see how high she can soar and whether others will follow in her wake.

— Chris DeVille for Stereogum

== Accolades and rankings ==
Pitchfork listed "Care" as one of the best songs of 2020, while Consequence of Sound ranked the same song at number 15 on their list of the Top 50 Songs of 2020. The New York Times and NME also included the song within the top 20 of both their year-end lists, while Crack Magazine ranked it at number 10 on their list.

Publications' year-end list appearances for Fake It Flowers
Critic/Publication	List	Rank	Ref
Consequence of Sound	Top 50 Albums of 2020	23	
PopMatters	Top 10 Indie Rock Albums of 2020	10	
Rolling Stone	The 50 Best Albums of 2020	39	
Under the Radar	Top 100 Albums of 2020	46	
Uproxx	The Best Albums and Songs of 2020	47	

The album was awarded the Western Music Award at the 13th CD Shop Awards in 2021.

== Commercial performance ==
In the UK, Fake It Flowers debuted at number 8 on the UK Albums Chart, becoming her first entry on the chart.

The album achieved minor commercial success elsewhere, peaking at number 96 in Australia, number 88 in Ireland, number 106 in Japan, number 88 on the Japanese Download Charts, number 3 in Scotland, number 189 in the United States, and number 28 on the Billboard Top Rock Albums chart.

== Tour ==
Fake It Flowers Tour
- Tour by Beabadoobee
- Location: Europe
- Associated album: Fake It Flowers
- Start date: 7 September 2021
- End date: 4 October 2021
- Legs: 1
- No. of shows: 14

In early September 2020, Beabadoobee announced the first leg of her headlining tour of the United Kingdom and Ireland to support Fake It Flowers in 2021.

List of 2021 concerts
Date	City	Country	Venue
Europe
7 September	Manchester	England	The Ritz
9 September	Leeds	England	Leeds Beckett University
10 September	Nottingham	England	Rescue Rooms
11 September	Birmingham	England	O2 Institute
13 September	Cambridge	England	Cambridge Junction
14 September	Leicester	England	O2 Academy Leicester
23 September	London	England	O2 Forum Kentish Town
24 September	Bristol	England	SWX
25 September	Oxford	England	O2 Academy Oxford
28 September	Dublin	Ireland	The Academy
29 September	Belfast	Northern Ireland	Oh Yeah
2 October	Newcastle	England	Newcastle University Students' Union
3 October	Edinburgh	Scotland	The Liquid Room
4 October	Glasgow	Scotland	SWG3

== Track listing ==
All tracks are written by Beabadoobee.

Fake It Flowers track listing
No.	Title	Length
1.	"Care"	3:14
2.	"Worth It"	3:14
3.	"Dye It Red"	3:09
4.	"Back to Mars"	1:30
5.	"Charlie Brown"	2:32
6.	"Emo Song"	3:38
7.	"Sorry"	3:53
8.	"Further Away"	3:07
9.	"Horen Sarrison"	5:35
10.	"How Was Your Day?"	4:20
11.	"Together"	3:20
12.	"Yoshimi, Forest, Magdalene"	3:24
Total length:		40:56

Japanese CD bonus track
No.	Title	Length
13.	"First Date"

== Personnel ==
Adapted from the album's liner notes.

=== Musicians ===
- Beabadoobee – writing, vocals, backing vocals, electric guitar, acoustic guitar (1–13)

Other musicians

- Louis Semlekan-Faith – drums, percussion
- Eliana Sewell – bass
- Jacob Bugden – guitar
- Matt Calvert – guitar
- Pete Robertson – keyboard, guitar, synth, bass, drums, percussion, backing vocals, string arrangement
- Joseph Rogers – backing vocals
- Guy Button – violin
- Elena Abad – violin
- Will Harvey – viola
- Gavin Kibble – cello

=== Technical ===
- Pete Robertson – programming, production
- Joseph Rogers – programming, engineering, production
- Jonathan Gilmore – mixing
- Robin Schmidt – mastering
- Josh Ager – engineering assistance
- Callum Harrison – engineering assistance (10)

=== Artwork ===
- Callum Harrison – photography
- James Rönkkö – artwork, layout, photography
- Kumiko Sekiguchi – photography

== Charts ==
Chart performance for Fake It Flowers
Chart (2020)	Peak position
Australian Albums (ARIA)	96
Irish Albums (IRMA)	88
Japanese Albums (Oricon)	106
Japan Download Albums (Billboard Japan)	88
Scottish Albums (Official Charts)	3
UK Albums (Official Charts)	8
US Billboard 200	189
US Heatseekers Albums (Billboard)	2
US Independent Albums (Billboard)	40
US Top Alternative Albums (Billboard)	13
US Top Rock Albums (Billboard)	28
