= Lowertown (band) =

American indie rock band

- Origin: Atlanta, Georgia, U.S.
- Genres: Indie rock, experimental pop, folk
- Years active: 2018–present
- Labels: Dirty Hit, Summer Shade
- Members: Olivia Osby; Avsha Weinberg
- Website: lowertown.band

Lowertown is an American indie rock duo formed in Atlanta, Georgia in 2018. The group consists of Olivia Osby and Avsha Weinberg. Originally emerging from the Atlanta DIY scene, the duo later relocated to New York City. Their music blends elements of indie rock, folk, and experimental pop. The duo's first EP was released in 2021, titled Honeycomb, Bedbug. The duo's second EP, The Gaping Mouth, was released in early 2022. Their debut album, I Love to Lie, was released in 2022 via Dirty Hit. In 2023, Lowertown released their third EP titled Skin of My Teeth. The duo met in a high school math class and bonded over a shared interest in music. Weinberg is a classically trained pianist, while Osby began writing poetry at a young age, which has influenced the lyric-driven nature of their work. The band signed with Dirty Hit prior to graduating high school, and departed from the label preceding the release of their third album. The name "Lowertown" is derived from the Lower Town neighborhood in Ottawa, Canada, where the duo worked on early demos.

== Artistry and Influences ==
Lowertown’s music is characterized by its emphasis on lyricism and narrative structure. Their work has been described by Stereogum as reminiscent of artists such as Phil Elverum and Alex G.

== Live Performances and Community ==
Lowertown’s audience has grown significantly through online platforms, where fans engage with the band’s music and visual themes. The duo maintains an active presence on platforms such as Instagram and YouTube.

== Touring ==
=== Headlining ===
- Ugly Duckling Union Tour (2026)
- U.S. Headlining Tour (2025)
- U.S. Winter Tour (2024)
- Fall East Coast Tour (2023)

=== Supporting ===
- European and UK Tour (2023) – supporting Wednesday
- North American Tour (2024) – supporting Wednesday
- Beatopia Tour (2022) – supporting beabadoobee
- North American Tour (2022) – supporting Wet Leg
- U.S. Tour (2022) – supporting Porches

=== Festival Appearances ===
- South by Southwest (2022, 2023)
- Shaky Knees Music Festival (2021)
- Pitchfork Music Festival (2022)
- Defend the Forest (2022)
- Sounds Like Bay Area (2025, headliner)

== Members ==
=== Current Members ===
- Olivia Osby – lead vocals, guitar (2018–present)
- Avsha Weinberg – lead vocals, guitar (2018–present)

=== Touring Members ===
- Joseph Clementi – Drums
- Immanuel Pennington – Drums (2024 - present)
- Sean Henry – Bass (2023 - present)
- Eva Smittle – Bass

== Discography ==
=== Studio Albums ===
- Friends (2019)
- I Love to Lie (2022, Dirty Hit)
- Ugly Duckling Union (2026, Summer Shade)

=== Extended Plays ===
- Honeycomb, Bedbug (2020, Dirty Hit)
- The Gaping Mouth (2021, Dirty Hit)
- Skin of My Teeth (2023, self-released)

=== Live Albums ===
- Lowertown on Audiotree Live (2023)

== Other Projects ==
Ugly Duckling Union is a conceptual project centered on a fictional character named Dale, expanding beyond music into visual and interactive media.
