= Loveworm =

EP by Beabadoobee
- Released: 26 April 2019
- Genre: Indie rock
- Length: 25:45
- Label: Dirty Hit
- Producers: Joseph Rogers; Pete Robertson

Beabadoobee chronology
Patched Up (2018)	Loveworm (2019)	Space Cadet (2019)

Loveworm is the third extended play by Filipino-English singer-songwriter Beabadoobee. The EP, recorded and produced by Pete Robertson (formerly of The Vaccines) and Joseph Rodgers, was released on 26 April 2019 through independent record label Dirty Hit. It marks a departure from the folk-influenced, lo-fi sound of her previous two EPs, Lice (2018) and Patched Up (2018), incorporating a wider variety of instrumentation and exploring a range of genres. The EP was not preceded by any singles, but was released alongside a one night headliner at Oslo in East London.

== Background and release ==
The conception of Loveworm dates back to November 2018, where a video posted to Bea's Instagram captioned "Another song I wrote eeK" shows her playing an early version of 1999. Over the following months, Bea continued to post short demos to her Instagram account, before eventually posting a short clip of a studio version of Disappear on 7 March 2019, followed by a similar clip of Angel on March 22, with the caption teasing: "...[EP out next month losers!]" Both of these snippets differ slightly from their respective final releases. On the 23rd, just 3 days before the EP was released, Bea officially announced the project, stating: "These collection of songs are probably some of my favourite songs [I've] written so far [...] This ones pretty different so get ready [to] head bang and cry ofc." Loveworm was released on April 26. On the same day, Billboard published an article in which Bea explains the inspiration and story behind each song on the record.

== Concept and composition ==
With the EP's release, Bea issued a statement, explaining the inspiration behind the project:

Hi, Loveworm is out where I live. This EP means so much to me. Love is hard and at times it could be the best thing ever... but I think it's important to go through all the shitty parts to really appreciate the beauty of it. This is a very personal and special EP, it helped me a lot whilst I was writing it, and I hope it will help you too. Lots of love, Bea x

For Complex, Bea said: "[This EP] was inspired by all the music I listened to during a hard time in my life. It helped me forget about everything. From The Moldy Peaches to Pavement to Daniel Johnston, music was always a means of escapism for me. I wanted to make songs that could belong to one of my playlists. Something people can dance and cry to."

Sonically, the EP is a significantly band-focused, indie rock departure from the lo-fi, folk-influenced sound of Bea's previous projects, Lice (2018) and Patched Up (2018). Described by Pitchfork as "straying further from the sheepish melancholy of bedroom pop," many of the tracks on the record feature the extensive use of electric guitar, drums, electric bass, and synthesizers, allowing for a "lusher," "more ambitious" sound in comparison to her previous EPs. Acoustic guitar, piano, and orchestral arrangements are also present throughout the record, developing off of the sonic elements explored in Patched Up. The EP has drawn comparisons to the likes of Elliott Smith, Dinosaur Jr., The Moldy Peaches, Pavement, and Mazzy Star. Every song on the EP is written in Open D (DADF#AD) tuning.

Lyrically, every song on the record focuses on an aspect the theme of love, including "how love can consume someone so much and all of a sudden disappear," and "how a tiny crush can leave someone in denial and [...] confused." For i-D, Bea stated that the entire EP is about her relationship with her boyfriend at the time, Soren Harrison. "Every song is basically part of a journey through these couple of months we went through that were quite rough," she told Graham Corrigan of Complex. "I remember him calling me after listening to the whole EP, and he was like, “I figured out a lot of things,” and I said, “Holy shit, thanks Loveworm!”"

== Critical reception ==
The EP was received well online, with critics noting Bea's strong lyricism and grunge-toned instrumentation. Alex Gardner of Complex described the EP as "[maintaining] a visceral, raw sound that balances the sweeping melancholy of '90s rock with the trademark intimacy of the current DIY style that is often the starting point for today's young musicians." Glenn Rowley of Billboard wrote that "the new project finds [Beabadoobee] wading through seven confessional tracks with her signature languid vocals, pointed songwriting chops and jangly, grunge-inspired sound." Amy Smolcic of Wickedd Child stated that the EP is "best listened to as a complete EP," going on to explain that "each track appears as if it were a page straight out of her diary — every word is weighted by the pain and aches of love, as well as the light at the end of the tunnel when it's over." Alim Kheraj of i-D stated of the EP: "Her sound [...] is intimate; close confessional vocals matched with stargazy guitars. But now, thanks to the studio time, she’s making things bigger. One thing remains, though: a DIY sense of rawness, unaffected by industry bullshit or concerns over streaming algorithms." Robin Murray of Clash Magazine described the EP as "a game-changing slice of extra-dimensional pop, with Beabadoobee's remarkable vision smeared across seven tracks."

== Bedroom Sessions ==
On 9 July 2019, Beabadoobee released an acoustic adaptation of Loveworm, titled Loveworm (Bedroom Sessions). Described by Jess Myers of Ones to Watch as "[offering] an elevated, delicate aesthetic that stays true to [her] softer musical tones," each track on the EP is a one-take recording of Bea and an acoustic guitar, drawing similarities to the demos she had been posting earlier that year, as well as the lo-fi elements of her earlier music. In the lead up to the EP's release, a set of videos were posted to the artist's YouTube channel, showcasing the live takes of the tracks on the EP, recorded from Bea's bedroom.

== Track listing ==
Loveworm track listing
No.	Title	Length
1.	"Disappear"	4:08
2.	"1999"	3:11
3.	"Apple Cider"	2:58
4.	"Ceilings"	3:59
5.	"Angel"	3:13
6.	"You Lie All the Time"	4:11
7.	"Soren"	4:01
Total length:		25:45

== Charts ==
Chart performance for Loveworm (Bedroom Sessions)
Chart (2023)	Peak position
Scottish Albums (Official Charts)	65
UK Independent Albums (Official Charts)	28
