= The Way Things Go (song) =

Single by Beabadoobee
- Released: 19 July 2023
- Genre: Indie rock; alt-pop; indie folk
- Length: 3:07
- Label: Dirty Hit
- Songwriter: Beatrice Laus
- Producer: Jacob Budgen

Beabadoobee singles chronology
"Glue Song" (2023)	"The Way Things Go" (2023)	"A Night to Remember" (2023)

"The Way Things Go" (stylised in all lowercase) is a song by the Filipino-English singer Beabadoobee. The song was released through Dirty Hit on 19 July 2023, as a stand-alone single. The melodic indie rock and alt-pop song with elements of indie folk was written by Beabadoobee and produced by Jacob Budgen.

== Background and release ==
Beabadoobee had first revealed the song months before its release, as she performed the song during her European tour multiple times. She announced "The Way Things Go" on 4 July 2023, but no release date was announced. On 11 July, the song's official release date was announced, which was 18 July 2023. Instead, it was released the following day, on 19 July.

== Composition and lyrics ==
The song has been described as an "airy, twinkling tune with a little sass". Lyrically, the song is an indie rock and alt-pop song with indie folk elements about expressing the inadequacy of words during a breakup.

== Critical reception ==
Consequence's Jo Vito called the track a "sentimental acoustic tune that captures all the candid magic of beabadoobee’s signature sound," writing that the song is "a simple tune with beautiful resonance," and further wrote that the song "almost feels like a classic acoustic ballad". Danielle Chelosky of Uproxx called the song's lyrics more serious and impactful than her preceding single, "Glue Song", stating Beabadoobee was "mature and clever" on the song.

== Music video ==
Directed by Jacob Erland, the video for "The Way Things Go" was released alongside the song. The video stars Beabadoobee and the song's producer Jacob Budgen alongside a number of ballet dancers in what NME describes as an "ornately decorated room".

== Charts ==
Weekly chart performance for "The Way Things Go"
Chart (2023)	Peak position
New Zealand Hot Singles (RMNZ)	20
UK Singles (OCC)	86
US Hot Rock & Alternative Songs (Billboard)	26

== Certifications ==
Certifications for "The Way Things Go"
Region	Certification	Certified units/sales
New Zealand (RMNZ)	Gold	15,000^{‡}
United Kingdom (BPI)	Silver	200,000^{‡}
United States (RIAA)	Platinum	1,000,000^{‡}
^{‡} Sales+streaming figures based on certification alone.
