= A Night to Remember (Beabadoobee and Laufey song) =

2023 single by Beabadoobee and Laufey

Single by Beabadoobee and Laufey
- Released: 20 October 2023
- Genre: Alternative pop; indie pop; jazz pop; bossa nova
- Length: 3:53
- Label: Independent
- Songwriters: Beatrice Laus; Laufey
- Producers: Jacob Bugden; Spencer Stewart

Beabadoobee singles chronology
"The Way Things Go" (2023)	"A Night to Remember" (2023)	"Take a Bite" (2024)

Laufey singles chronology
"Bewitched" (2023)	"A Night to Remember" (2023)	"Winter Wonderland" (2023)

Music video
- "A Night to Remember" on YouTube

"A Night to Remember" is a single by Filipino and English singer-songwriter Beabadoobee and Icelandic singer-songwriter Laufey, released on 20 October 2023.

== Background and release ==
On 11 October 2023, both Beabadoobee and Laufey teased the song on TikTok.

The song was released on 20 October alongside a lyric video.

== Composition ==
Promoted as 'the other side of the coin of all the songs about being rejected as a woman', "A Night to Remember" is an alternative, indie, and jazz pop song with bossa nova features.

== Critical reception ==
The Independent's Catarina Vicente described the song as "sweet and explores uncharted musical territory for the two young artists", however, she mentioned that "it can feel one-dimensional due to its short running time" and "it is a captivating experience that doesn't last for too long but leaves the other party wanting more".

== Music video ==
A music video directed by Jake Erland was released 26 October. It follows two dancers around various landmarks in a cold, rainy night in London.

== Credits and personnel ==
Credits are adapted from Apple Music.

- Beatrice Laus – vocals, songwriter
- Laufey – vocals, songwriter
- Jacob Bugden – producer
- Spencer Stewart – producer

== Charts ==
Weekly chart performance for "A Night to Remember"
Chart (2023)	Peak position
New Zealand Hot Singles (RMNZ)	3
Singapore Regional (RIAS)	30
UK Singles (Official Charts)	84
UK Indie (Official Charts)	40
US Bubbling Under Hot 100 (Billboard)	17
US Hot Rock & Alternative Songs (Billboard)	25
