= Caleb Steph =

American rapper (born 1998)

- Born: Caleb Stephenson; December 21, 1998 (age 27); Newport News, Virginia, U.S.
- Origin: Newport News, Virginia, U.S.
- Genres: Hip hop
- Occupations: Rapper; songwriter; Record producer
- Instruments: Vocals
- Years active: 2015–present
- Label: Dirty Hit (former)

Caleb Stephenson (born December 21, 1998), better known by his stage name Caleb Steph, is an American rapper from Newport News, Virginia.

== Career ==
Caleb started making music at the age of 12. When he was 16 he started taking music more seriously as a career. Caleb began uploading his music onto SoundCloud in early 2015. In 2017, he receives the attention of Dirty Hit and ends up signing with them.

In February 2019, Caleb released his debut single "Can I Talk" under Dirty Hit. The following month he released "Trapped", produced by Sha Money XL, as the lead single to his debut project "Bellwood Product". The EP was released on April 12, 2019, with the "Black Boy" music video dropping the same day. After releasing his standalone self-produced single "Therapy Sessions" in February 2020, Caleb announced his departure from Dirty Hit, citing misrepresentation and unfair treatment.

== Artistry ==
Steph has listed Clipse, Pharrell Williams, Jay-Z, MF Doom, Joey Badass, J Dilla, Bow Wow, The Notorious B.I.G., Kendrick Lamar, and Kanye West as some of his influences.

== Discography ==
=== EPs ===
- Bellwood Product (2019)

=== Guest appearances ===
List of guest appearances, with other performing artists, showing year released and album name
Title	Year	Artist(s)	Album
"Ramona"	2020	Sha Money XL, Marco McKinnis	Chain On The Bike Vol. 1

=== Music videos ===
List of music videos, with selected details
Title	Year	Director(s)
"Trapped"	2019	Andrew Donoho
"Black Boy"	2019	Daniel Regan
