= Switchblade (song) =

Single by Beabadoobee

from the album Pylon
- Released: 14 July 2026
- Length: 3:01
- Label: Dirty Hit
- Songwriter: Beatrice Laus
- Composer: Laus
- Producers: Laus; Jason Vance Harris; Luca Caruso

Beabadoobee singles chronology
"Sun Has Set" (2026)	"Switchblade" (2026)	"Memories" (2026)

"Switchblade" is a song by the Filipino and English singer Beabadoobee. The song was released through Dirty Hit on 14 July 2026, as the second single from her fourth studio album, Pylon (2026).

== Background ==
Following the release of "Sun Has Set" on 24 June, and the announcement of her upcoming studio album, Pylon, Beabadoobee announced Swichblade as the second single from the album on 9 July. The song released on 14 July with an accompanying lyric video.

== Credits and personnel ==
Credits are adapted from Apple Music.

- Beatrice Laus – vocals, composer, songwriter, producer
- Jason Vance Harris – producer
- Luca Caruso – producer
- Adam Loeffler – immersive mixing engineer
