= The Bedroom Sessions (Faithless album) =

Compilation album by Various Artists
- Released: August 2001
- Genre: Electronic, trip hop, dance
- Length: 64:00
- Label: Mixmag
- Producer: Faithless

Faithless chronology
Outrospective (2001)	The Bedroom Sessions (2001)	Outrospective / Reperspective (2002)

Professional ratings
Review scores
Source	Rating
Discogs.com	link

The Bedroom Sessions by Faithless was released with the 123rd issue of Mixmag in August 2001. It was compiled by Sister Bliss, Rollo Armstrong and Maxi Jazz of Faithless.

== Track listing ==
1. Nuyorican Soul - "Black Gold of the Sun" - 5:08
2. Dillinger - "Cocaine In My Brain" (Groove Corporation Mix) - 5:53
3. Wayne Smith - "Under Me Sleng Teng" - 3:45
4. A Man Called Adam - "Estelle" - 6:17
5. Cry Sisco! - "Afrodizziact" (Oakenfold's Raid Mix) - 5:47
6. Bent - "Swollen" - 7:15
7. Tom McRae - "You Cut Her Hair" - 2:24
8. Jestofunk - "Can We Live" - 6:13
9. Fallout - "Morning After" (Sunrise Mix) - 6:29
10. Orr-Some - "We Can Make It" (Hardcore Remix) - 4:54
11. M. J. Cole - "Sincere" - 5:36
12. Nick Drake - "River Man" - 4:19
