= Sun Has Set =

Single by Beabadoobee

from the album Pylon
- Released: 24 June 2026
- Genre: Indie rock
- Length: 2:21
- Label: Dirty Hit
- Songwriters: Beatrice Laus; Shane Moran; Gianluca Buccellati
- Composers: Laus; Moran; Buccellati
- Producers: Laus; Buccellati; Jason Vance Harris

Beabadoobee singles chronology
"All I Did Was Dream of You" (2026)	"Sun Has Set" (2026)	"Switchblade" (2026)

Music video
- "Sun Has Set" on YouTube

"Sun Has Set" is a song by the Filipino and English singer Beabadoobee. The song was released through Dirty Hit on 24 June 2026, as the lead single from her fourth studio album, Pylon (2026).

== Background ==
On 17 June, Beabadoobee announced that she would release the single "Sun Has Set" on 24 June.

On 24 June, it was announced that "Sun Has Set" is included in her fourth studio album, Pylon, which was fully released on 18 September 2026.

== Music video ==
Directed by Jake Erland, the music video for "Sun Has Set" was released alongside the song.

== Credits and personnel ==
Credits are adapted from Apple Music.

- Beatrice Laus – vocals, composer, songwriter, producer
- Shane Moran – composer, songwriter
- Gianluca Buccellati – composer, songwriter, producer
- Jason Vance Harris – producer
- Evie Clark-Yospa – recording engineer
- Connor Simpkins – recording engineer
- Eva Valentin – assistant recording engineer
- Jonny Breakwell – assistant recording engineer
- Oli Jacobs – mixing engineer
- Fraser Latimer – assistant mixing engineer
- Cam Gilfoy – assistant mixing engineer

== Charts ==
Chart performance for "Sun Has Set"
Chart (2026)	Peak position
Japan Hot Overseas (Billboard Japan)	14
New Zealand Hot Singles (RMNZ)	19
US Adult Alternative Airplay (Billboard)	39
