= Beabadoobee =

Filipino and British singer (born 2000)

- Beabadoobee in 2024

Background information
- Also known as: Bea Kristi
- Born: Beatrice Kristi Ilejay Laus (Note: Beabadoobee was born in the Philippines. Thus, she possesses her mother's maiden name which is "Ilejay", while other publications have claimed her second name is "Kristi". She was also referred to as "Bea Regner" in her early career.); June 3, 2000 (age 26); Iloilo City, Philippines
- Origin: London, England
- Genres: Pop; indie rock; pop rock; alternative rock; post-Britpop; slacker rock; indie pop; folk-pop; bedroom pop
- Occupations: Musician; singer; songwriter
- Instruments: Vocals; guitar
- Years active: 2017–present
- Label: Dirty Hit
- Website: beabadoobee.com

Beatrice Kristi Ilejay Laus (born June 3, 2000), known professionally as Beabadoobee (/biːbəˈduːbiː/; bee-bə-DOO-bee; stylized in all lowercase), is a Filipino and British singer and songwriter. From 2018 to 2021, she released five extended plays (EPs) under the independent label Dirty Hit: Lice (2018), Patched Up (2018), Loveworm (2019), Space Cadet (2019) and Our Extended Play (2021). Her debut studio album Fake It Flowers was released in October 2020, and received critical acclaim. Her second studio album, Beatopia, was released on July 2022, and spawned the hit "The Perfect Pair". Her third studio album, This Is How Tomorrow Moves, was released in August 2024; it became her first album to peak atop the UK Albums Chart. In September 2026, her fourth studio album, Pylon topped the British and Australian charts.

Beabadoobee served as a supporting act for labelmates the 1975 during several legs of their Music for Cars Tour, as well as American singer Clairo's Immunity Tour, Olivia Rodrigo’s Guts World Tour and Taylor Swift's the Eras Tour. She was nominated for the Rising Star Award at the 2020 Brit Awards, and was presented with the Radar Award at the 2020 NME Awards. Beabadoobee was also predicted as a breakthrough act for 2020 in an annual BBC poll of music critics, Sound of 2020.

== Early life and education ==
Laus was born in Iloilo City in the Philippines on June 3, 2000 and moved to the United Kingdom with her parents at the age of three. She grew up in West London listening to Original Pilipino Music as well as pop and rock music from the 1990s. While she was a teenager, she listened to indie rock artists including Karen O, Yeah Yeah Yeahs, Florist and Alex G.

She studied at Sacred Heart High School, an all-girls Catholic school, before completing her thirteenth year at Hammersmith Academy. Laus was expelled from her school at the age of 17, due to failing grades and "misfit behavior". Laus spent seven years learning to play the violin, before getting her first guitar second-hand at the age of 17. She also learned through watching YouTube tutorials produced by other accomplished guitarists. She was inspired by Kimya Dawson and the Juno soundtrack to start making music.

== Career ==
=== 2017–2019: "Coffee" and early EPs ===
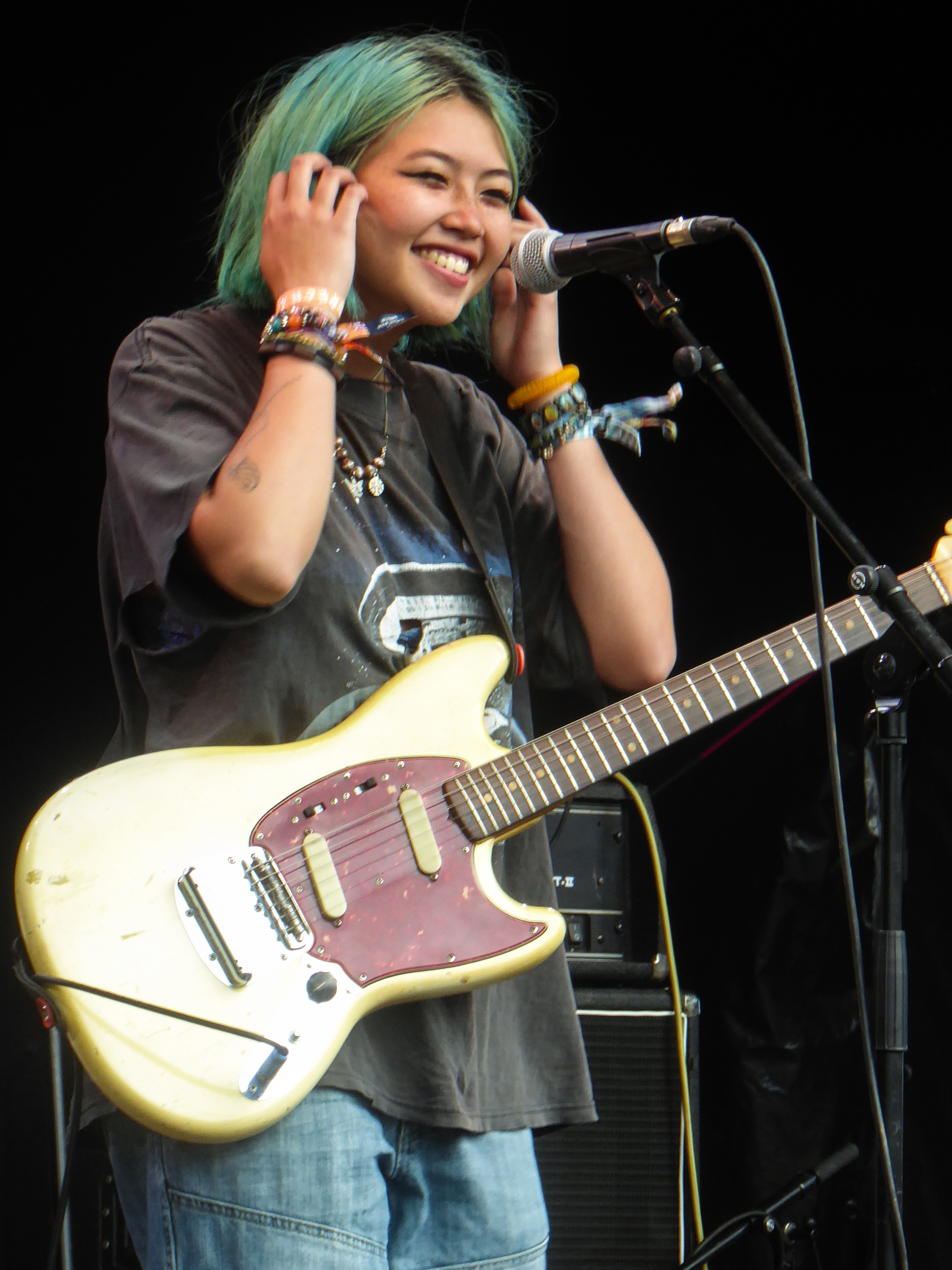
Beabadoobee performing in 2019

The first song Beabadoobee wrote on her guitar was "Coffee". She took her professional name as a joke when her friend and producer Oscar Lang was preparing to upload "Coffee" and suggested she release her music under an artist name. Beabadoobee was a name she had invented for her finsta account because none of her names were being accepted by Instagram.

She released "Coffee" as well as a cover of Karen O's "The Moon Song" in September 2017. "Coffee" gained over 300,000 views on YouTube, as well as the attention of Dirty Hit Records. She signed to the label in April 2018. This was followed by the release of her debut EP Lice in March 2018 and her second EP Patched Up in December 2018. In January 2019, Beabadoobee was placed with Billie Eilish on NME's annual list of "essential new artists", the "NME 100". She subsequently released her third EP titled Loveworm. Beabadoobee released an acoustic version of this EP titled Loveworm (Bedroom Sessions) in July 2019.

In September 2019, Beabadoobee embarked on her first tour supporting Clairo on her Immunity Tour, before releasing her fourth EP, Space Cadet, in October 2019. Beabadoobee subsequently made the front cover of NME on October 25, 2019. She was shortlisted for the Rising Star Award at the 2020 Brit Awards in December 2019. In November 2019, Beabadoobee released a pair of Spotify Singles, one being a cover of "Don't You Forget About Me" by Simple Minds as well as a version of "She Plays Bass" recorded in Abbey Road Studios in London. In December 2019, Beabadoobee was longlisted in the annual BBC poll of music critics, Sound of 2020.

=== 2020–2021: "Death Bed", Fake It Flowers, and Our Extended Play ===
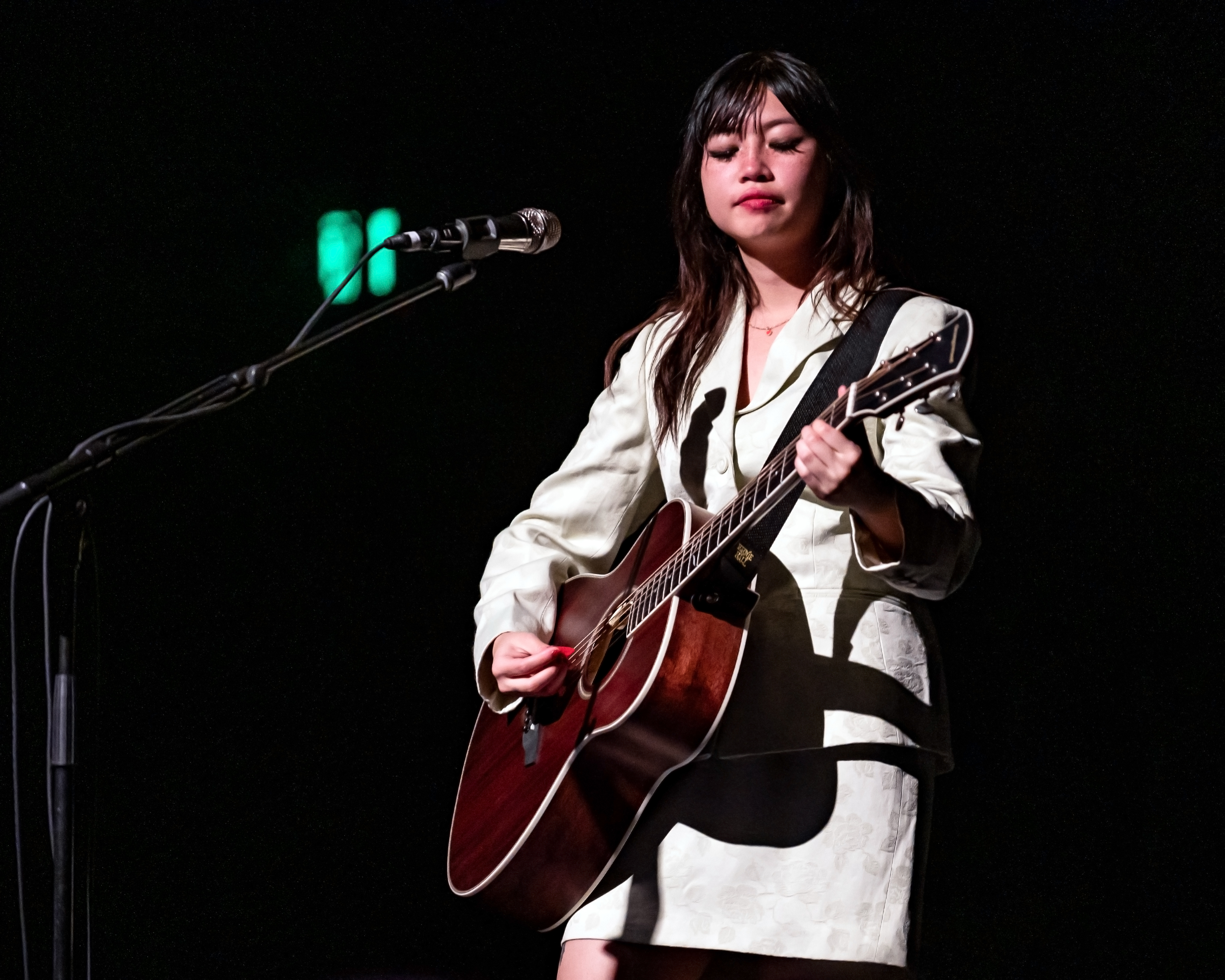
Beabadoobee performing in 2021

In February 2020, Beabadoobee performed at the 2020 NME Awards after winning the Radar Award. She supported labelmates the 1975 on their Music for Cars Tour for both the U.K. leg in February 2020. She was scheduled to also support the band during the North American leg of this tour in April 2020; however, it was postponed due to the COVID-19 pandemic.

A sample of Beabadoobee's 2017 debut single "Coffee" was used on Canadian rapper Powfu's 2019 single, "Death Bed (Coffee for Your Head)". The song became a massively successful sleeper hit after going viral on the app TikTok in early 2020, becoming Beabadoobee's first official chart entry in her career, both locally and internationally. By April 2020, it had entered the Top 5 in several countries including the U.K., Australia and New Zealand. It earned gold certification status in Belgium, Canada, France, Mexico and New Zealand, as well as Platinum or higher in the U.S. and the U.K. among several other countries. Speaking about her reaction to the popularization of "Death Bed", Beabadoobee said, "I'm not going to lie, it was overwhelming... I kinda hated it. I hated more people knowing about the first song I'd ever written and not my others. I was so stubborn but I grew into it and accepted that's just how life works. I was extremely grateful for its existence and it's only given me more opportunities."

Beabadoobee announced her debut studio album, Fake It Flowers, and released its lead single "Care" on July 14, 2020. In early August 2020, she released the album's second single, "Sorry", and revealed the album's track listing, cover art and official release date. Beabadoobee released "Worth It" as the third single, "How Was Your Day?" as the fourth single, and "Together" as the fifth and final single of Fake It Flowers. The album was released on October 16, 2020, to critical acclaim and spent one week in the UK Albums Chart at number 8. According to sales in the United States, Billboard ranked Beabadoobee as the Top New Rock Artist of 2020. She was also one of Apple's Up Next artists in November 2020, releasing two short film-style interviews. In 2021, she embarked on a headlining tour of the United Kingdom and Ireland to support the album.

Beabadoobee released the single "Last Day on Earth" on March 24, produced and co-written by Matty Healy and George Daniel of the 1975. The musician announced that the single is taken from her EP Our Extended Play, which she said that she wrote with her labelmates "on the countryside".

=== 2022–2025: Beatopia and This Is How Tomorrow Moves ===
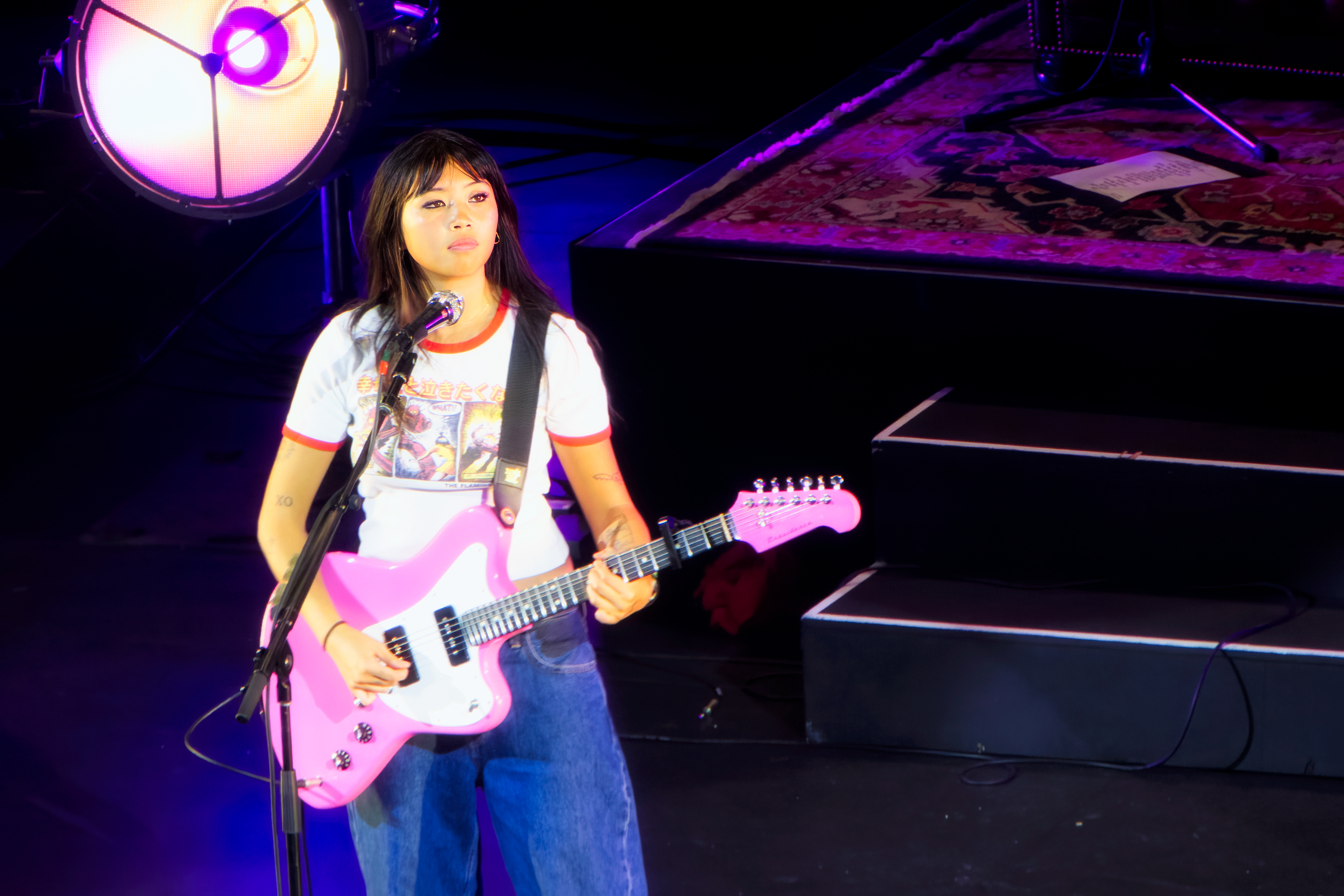
Beabadoobee performing in 2023

Her second album, Beatopia, was announced on March 23, 2022. It was released on July 15, 2022, through Dirty Hit and spawned the R.I.A.A. Gold certified song "The Perfect Pair."

In January 2023, Beabadoobee posted the snippet of an unreleased song on TikTok, which soon went viral across the website due to its popularity with couples and the approach of the upcoming holiday. "Glue Song" was later released on Valentine's Day, February 14, 2023, with another version featuring Clairo released on April 17, 2023, which charted in several countries. The collaboration gained significant attention and marked a continued evolution in her sound, blending chamber pop with heartfelt lyrics inspired by her personal experiences.

Starting in March 2023, Beabadoobee toured in Germany, Italy, Luxembourg, Belgium, Norway, Netherlands, Sweden and Denmark. Beabadoobee also performed as an opening act on twelve shows of the US leg of Taylor Swift's 2023 The Eras Tour.

On June 29, 2023, Beabadoobee announced that she would cancel her European tour due to an unspecified illness. She then announced a new single on July 11, 2023, called "The Way Things Go", which was released on July 19. Beabadoobee then released a new single with Laufey, "A Night to Remember", which was released on October 20, 2023.

Her third studio album, This Is How Tomorrow Moves, was released on August 9, 2024, which went on to debut at number 1 in the UK, making it her first number-one album. The album contained hits such as: California, Real Man, Beaches, and Take A Bite.

=== 2026–present: Pylon and Bananas 4 Cats ===
On June 24, 2026, Beabadoobee announced her fourth studio album, Pylon, which released on September 18, 2026 via Dirty Hit, featuring collaborations with Chino Moreno, Hayley Williams, and Brendan Yates. The album's lead single, "Sun Has Set", was released the same day. On July 14 of the same year, she released another single, "Switchblade", followed by the third and final single of the album, "Memories", on August 20. Beginning on July 30, 2026, she embarked upon an international tour in support of Pylon. The album went on to debut at number 1 in the UK, Australia, and Scotland making it her second number-one album. It is also her first top 10 album on the Billboard 200, debuting at No. 7. She embarked on The Powerlines Tour, her first arena tour, in support of the album in 2026 and 2027.

On November 19, 2026, she released the single "No Punctuation" as the lead single for her album Bananas 4 Cats. The album is scheduled to release on February 19, 2026 and has been described as a response to Pylon.

== Influences ==
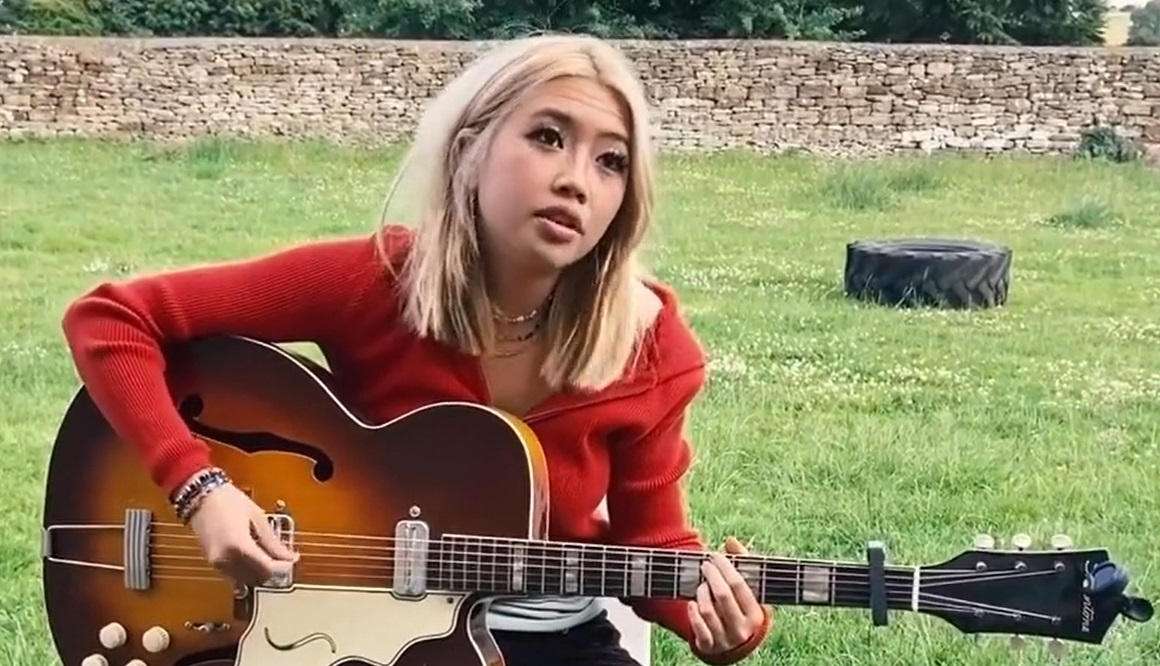
Beabadoobee singing an acoustic rendition of her song "Care" in 2020

Laus has cited Apo Hiking Society, the Beatles, Mac DeMarco, Daniel Johnston, Mazzy Star, the Moldy Peaches, Pavement, Simon and Garfunkel, Elliott Smith, Avril Lavigne, Veruca Salt and the Sundays as her musical influences. She has a tattoo of Johnston's artwork from the cover of his album Continued Story with Texas Instruments. In a 2018 interview with Vice, she expressed plans to make film soundtracks in the future as they heavily inspired her to make music. Laus' musical style is also deeply influenced by 80s alternative rock and shoegaze bands like the Cure, My Bloody Valentine, the Smashing Pumpkins, and the Smiths.

== Personal life ==
Laus is bisexual. She says that she can understand the Philippine languages Hiligaynon and Tagalog, but cannot speak them.

== Discography ==
=== Studio albums ===
List of studio albums, with release date and label shown
Title	Details	Peak chart positions										Sales	Certifications
Title	Details	UK	AUS	BEL (FL)	CAN	IRL	JPN	NLD	POR	SCO	US	Sales	Certifications
Fake It Flowers	Released: October 16, 2020; Label: Dirty Hit; Format: Cassette, CD, LP, digital download, streaming	8	96	—	—	88	106	—	—	3	189	UK: 41,287	
Beatopia	Released: July 15, 2022; Label: Dirty Hit; Formats: LP, CD, cassette, digital download, streaming	4	19	—	—	50	64	—	—	3	— (Note: Beatopia did not enter the US Billboard 200 but peaked at number 29 on the Top Album Sales chart.)	UK: 93,964	BPI: Silver; RMNZ: Gold
This Is How Tomorrow Moves	Released: August 9, 2024; Label: Dirty Hit; Formats: LP, CD, cassette, digital download, streaming	1	6	53	71	29	—	71	48	1	34	UK: 94,207	BPI: Silver
Pylon	Released: September 18, 2026; Label: Dirty Hit; Formats: LP, CD, cassette, digital download, streaming	1	1	34	65	17	—	33	—	1	7	US: 35,000	
Bananas 4 Cats	Released: February 19, 2027; Label: Dirty Hit; Formats: LP, CD, cassette, digital download, streaming	To be released											
"—" denotes releases that did not chart or were not released in that region.

=== Live albums ===
List of live albums, with release date and label shown
Title	Details	Peak chart positions			
Title	Details	UK Sales	UK Indie	SCO	US Sales
Live and Acoustic in London	Released: April 12, 2025; Label: Dirty Hit; Format: LP	13	3	9	44

=== Extended plays ===
List of extended plays, with release date, label, and selected chart positions shown
Title	Details	Peak chart positions		
Title	Details	UK Sales	UK Indie	SCO
Lice	Released: February 28, 2018; Label: Dirty Hit; Formats: Digital download, streaming	— (Note: Lice did not enter the UK Official Albums Chart Top 100 but peaked at number 99 on the UK Physical Singles Chart.)	—	—
Patched Up	Released: December 7, 2018; Label: Dirty Hit; Formats: LP, CS, digital download, streaming	—	—	—
Loveworm	Released: April 26, 2019; Label: Dirty Hit; Formats: LP, CS, digital download, streaming	—	49	—
Loveworm (Bedroom Sessions)	Released: July 9, 2019; Label: Dirty Hit; Formats: LP, digital download, streaming	77	28	65
Space Cadet	Released: October 14, 2019; Label: Dirty Hit; Formats: LP, digital download, streaming	—	— (Note: Space Cadet did not enter the UK Independent Albums Chart but peaked at number 14 on the UK Independent Album Breakers Chart.)	—
Our Extended Play	Released: June 23, 2021; Label: Dirty Hit; Formats: LP, digital download, streaming	—	—	—
"—" denotes a recording that did not chart or was not released in that territory

=== Singles ===
==== As lead artist ====
List of singles, with year released, selected chart positions and album details shown
Title	Year	Peak chart positions										Certifications	Album
Title	Year	UK	BEL (FL) Tip	CAN	ICE	IRE	JPN Over.	NLD Air.	NZ Hot	US	US Rock	Certifications	Album
"Coffee"	2017	— (Note: "Coffee" did not enter the UK Official Singles Chart Top 100 but peaked at number 47 on the UK Singles Sales Chart.)	—	—	—	—	—	—	—	—	—	RIAA: Gold	Non-album singles
"The Moon Song"	2017	—	—	—	—	—	—	—	—	—	—		Non-album singles
"Susie May"	2018	—	—	—	—	—	—	—	—	—	—		Non-album singles
"Dance with Me"	2018	—	—	—	—	—	—	—	—	—	—		Patched Up
"If You Want To"	2019	—	—	—	—	—	—	—	—	—	—		Patched Up
"Disappear"	2019	—	—	—	—	—	—	—	—	—	—		Loveworm
"She Plays Bass"	2019	—	—	—	—	—	—	—	—	—	—		Space Cadet
"I Wish I Was Stephen Malkmus"	2019	—	— (Note: "I Wish I Was Stephen Malkmus" did not enter the Ultratop Top 50, but charted as an extra tip on the Ultratop Bubbling Under chart.)	—	—	—	—	—	—	—	—		Space Cadet
"Care"	2020	—	46	—	—	—	—	15	—	—	— (Note: "Care" did not enter the Billboard Hot Rock & Alternative Songs chart but peaked at number 27 on the Rock & Alternative Airplay component chart.)		Fake It Flowers
"Sorry"	2020	—	—	—	—	—	—	—	—	—	—		Fake It Flowers
"Worth It"	2020	—	—	—	14	—	12	—	—	—	—		Fake It Flowers
"How Was Your Day?"	2020	—	—	—	—	—	—	—	—	—	—		Fake It Flowers
"Together"	2020	—	—	—	—	—	—	—	—	—	—		Fake It Flowers
"Last Day on Earth"	2021	—	— (Note: "Last Day On Earth" did not enter the Ultratop Top 50, but charted as an extra tip on the Ultratop Bubbling Under chart.)	—	27	—	12	—	—	—	— (Note: "Last Day on Earth" did not enter the Billboard Hot Rock & Alternative Songs chart but peaked at number 28 on the Adult Alternative Airplay component chart.)		Our Extended Play
"Cologne"	2021	– (Note: "Cologne" did not enter the UK Official Singles Chart Top 100 but peaked at number 13 on the UK Physical Singles Chart.)	—	—	—	—	—	—	—	—	—		Our Extended Play
"Talk"	2022	—	—	—	—	—	12	—	—	—	— (Note: "Talk" did not enter the Billboard Hot Rock & Alternative Songs chart but peaked at number 30 on the Rock & Alternative Airplay component chart.)		Beatopia
"See You Soon"	2022	—	—	—	—	—	—	—	—	—	—		Beatopia
"Lovesong"	2022	—	—	—	—	—	—	—	—	—	—		Beatopia
"10:36"	2022	—	—	—	—	—	—	—	—	—	—		Beatopia
"The Perfect Pair"	2022	89	—	—	9	—	—	—	—	—	19	BPI: Gold; RIAA: 2× Platinum; RMNZ: Platinum	Beatopia
"Glue Song"	2023	38	—	75	—	56	13	—	11	— (Note: "Glue Song" did not enter the Billboard Hot 100, but peaked at number 13 on the Bubbling Under Hot 100 chart.)	12	BPI: Gold; RIAA: 2× Platinum; RMNZ: Platinum	Non-album singles
"The Way Things Go"	2023	86	—	—	—	—	—	—	20	—	26	BPI: Silver; RIAA: Platinum; RMNZ: Gold	Non-album singles
"A Night to Remember" (with Laufey)	2023	84	—	—	—	—	—	—	3	— (Note: "A Night to Remember" did not enter the Billboard Hot 100, but peaked at number 17 on the Bubbling Under Hot 100 chart.)	25		Non-album singles
"Take a Bite"	2024	68	—	—	—	—	—	—	12	—	24		This Is How Tomorrow Moves
"Coming Home"	2024	—	—	—	—	—	—	—	—	—	—		This Is How Tomorrow Moves
"Ever Seen"	2024	—	—	—	—	—	14	—	—	—	—		This Is How Tomorrow Moves
"Beaches"	2024	—	—	—	—	—	—	—	10	—	27	BPI: Silver; RMNZ: Gold	This Is How Tomorrow Moves
"Real Man"	2024	64	—	—	—	—	—	—	27	— (Note: "Real Man" did not enter the Billboard Hot 100, but peaked at number 13 on the Bubbling Under Hot 100 chart.)	13	BPI: Silver; RMNZ: Gold	This Is How Tomorrow Moves
"Sway" (Triple J Like a Version)	2025	—	—	—	—	—	—	—	34	—	—		Non-album singles
"All I Did Was Dream of You" (featuring The Marías)	2026	60	—	79	—	—	19	—	3	84	16		Non-album singles
"Sun Has Set"	2026	—	—	—	—	—	14	—	19	—	— (Note: "Sun Has Set" did not enter the Billboard Hot Rock & Alternative Songs chart but peaked at number 38 on the Adult Alternative Airplay component chart.)		Pylon
"Switchblade"	2026	—	—	—	—	—	—	—	—	—	—		Pylon
"Memories"	2026	—	—	—	—	—	18	—	37	—	—		Pylon
"Write Me a Letter"	2026	—	—	—	—	—	—	—	24	—	48		Pylon
"No Punctuation"	2026	—	—	—	—	—	—	—	—	—	—		Bananas 4 Cats
"—" denotes a recording that did not chart or was not released in that territory

==== As featured artist ====
List of singles, with year released, selected chart positions and album details shown
Title	Year	Peak chart positions										Certifications	Album
Title	Year	UK	AUS	CAN	FIN	IRE	NL	NOR	NZ	SWE	US	Certifications	Album
"Death Bed (Coffee for Your Head)" (Powfu featuring Beabadoobee)	2020	4	5	11	9	7	11	14	5	15	23	BPI: 2× Platinum; ARIA: 3× Platinum; BRMA: Gold; FIMI: 2× Platinum; IFPI SWE: 2× Platinum; MC: 5× Platinum; RIAA: 5× Platinum; RMNZ: 4× Platinum	Poems of the Past
"Silver into Rain" (Luna Li featuring Beabadoobee)	2022	—	—	—	—	—	—	—	—	—	—		Duality
"iScream" (Deaton Chris Anthony with Beabadoobee)	2022	—	—	—	—	—	—	—	—	—	—		Sid the Kid
"Fall in Love with a Girl" (Cavetown featuring Beabadoobee)	2022	—	—	—	—	—	—	—	—	—	—		worm food
"—" denotes a recording that did not chart or was not released in that territory

=== Other charted and certified songs ===
List of songs, with year released, selected chart positions and album details shown
Title	Year	Peak chart positions			Certifications	Album
Title	Year	UK Sales	JPN Over.	NZ Hot	Certifications	Album
"Tired"	2018	—	—	—	RIAA: Gold; RMNZ: Gold	Patched Up
"He Gets Me So High"	2021	—	20	—		Our Extended Play
"California"	2024	—	—	25		This Is How Tomorrow Moves
"One Time"	2024	—	—	38		This Is How Tomorrow Moves
"Pylon"	2026	—	—	38		Pylon
"Estranged"	2026	—	—	37		Pylon
"Radio"	2026	—	—	36		Pylon
"Candy"	2026	90	—	—		Pylon
"—" denotes a recording that did not chart or was not released in that territory

== Tours ==
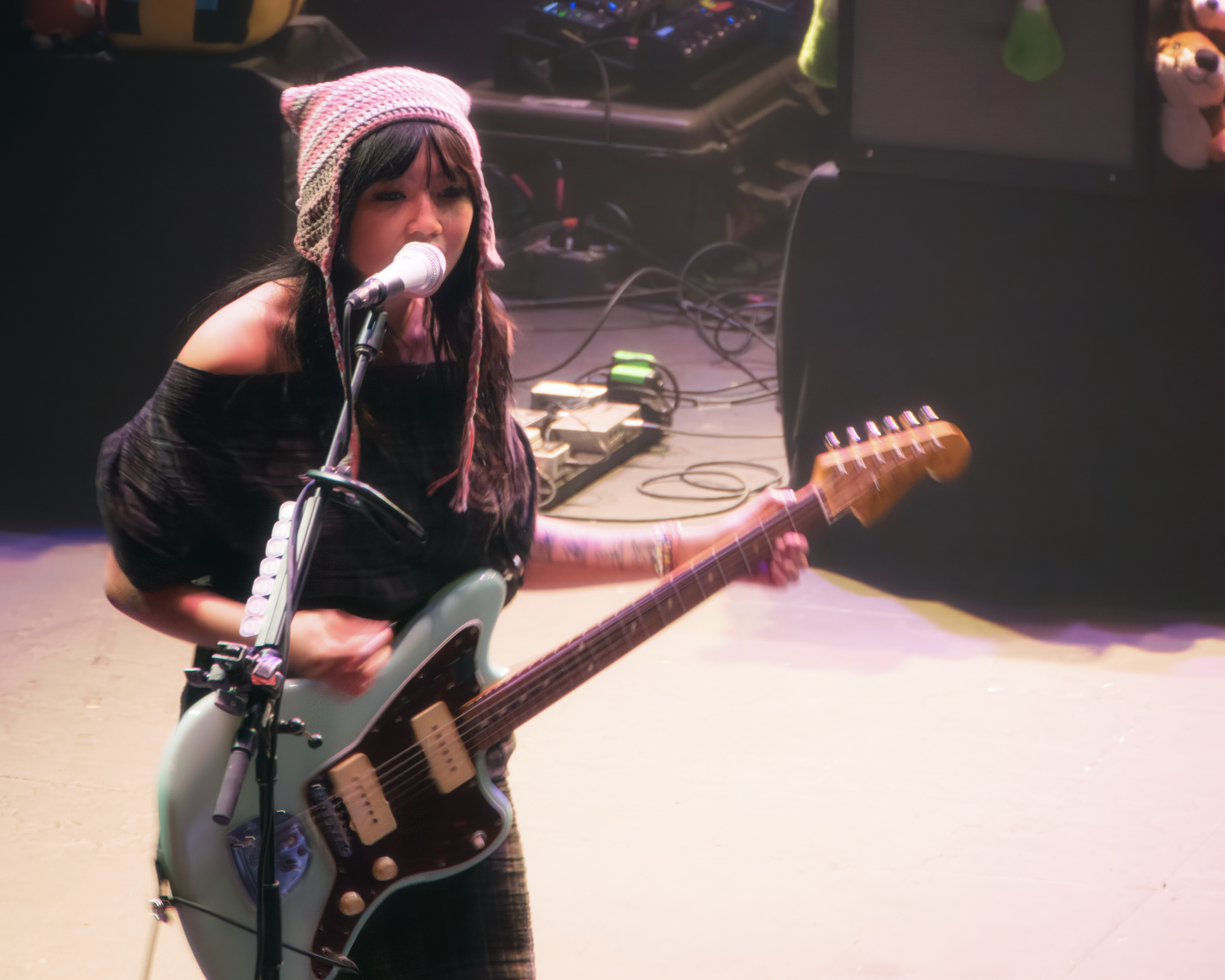
Beabadoobee performing at the Moore Theatre on the Beatopia Tour in 2022

Headlining

- Fake It Flowers Tour (2021)
- US Tour 2022 (2022)
- Beatopia Tour (2022)
- US Summer Tour (2023)
- This Is How Tomorrow Moves Tour (2024)
- The Space In Between Tour (2025)
- The Powerlines Tour (2026–2027)

Supporting

- Clairo – Immunity Tour (2019)
- The 1975 – Music for Cars Tour (2020)
- Halsey – Love and Power Tour (2022)
- Taylor Swift – The Eras Tour (2023)
- Olivia Rodrigo – Guts World Tour (2025)
- Sabrina Carpenter – Short n' Sweet Tour (2025)

== Awards and nominations ==
Accolades for Beabadoobee
Organization	Year	Award	Work	Result
AIM Independent Music Awards	2021	Best Live Streamed Act	Herself	Nominated
BMI London Awards	2025	Award-Winning Song	"Glue Song"	Won
Brit Awards	2020	Herself	Rising Star	Nominated
Brit Awards	2025	Herself	British Artist of the Year	Nominated
Brit Awards	2025	Herself	British Rock/Alternative Act	Nominated
BBC	2020	Herself	Sound of 2020	Longlisted
NME Awards	2020	Herself	Radar Award	Won
UK Music Video Awards	2019	Best Rock Video – Newcomer	"Disappear"	Nominated
UK Music Video Awards	2020	Best Rock Video – Newcomer	"I Wish I Was Stephen Malkmus"	Nominated
UK Music Video Awards	2021	Best Rock Video – UK	"Last Day on Earth"	Won
UK Music Video Awards	2022	Best Pop Video – Newcomer	"Fall in Love with a Girl" (with Cavetown)	Won
UK Music Video Awards	2023	Best Pop Video – Newcomer	"Glue Song"	Nominated
SOCAN Songwriting Prize	2023	English Songwriter of the Year	"Silver Into Rain" (with Luna Li)	Won
