= Dirty Hit =

British independent record label

- Founded: 2 February 2010; 16 years ago
- Founder: Jamie Oborne; Brian Smith; Ugo Ehiogu
- Status: Active
- Distributors: Virgin Music Group (digital); Polydor (only The 1975); Universal Music Group (physical); Interscope Records (The 1975 and Beabadoobee)
- Genre: Various, with a focus on alternative and electronic
- Country of origin: United Kingdom
- Location: London, UK; Los Angeles, US; Sydney, Australia; Tokyo, Japan
- Official website: dirtyhit.co.uk

Dirty Hit Limited is a British independent record label founded in February 2010 by Jamie Oborne, Chuck Waite, Brian Smith and former England footballer Ugo Ehiogu. The company is based in London, and expanded operations to Los Angeles, Sydney and Tokyo in 2020.

In 2019, Complex stated that "Dirty Hit has become known for championing their artists' individuality".

== History ==
Jamie Oborne began working in artist management after founding his company, All On Red Management. When Drive Like I Do, a Manchester-based band later known as The 1975, remained unsigned despite meetings with several record labels, Oborne decided to establish his own record label with Chuck Waite, Brian Smith and former England footballer Ugo Ehiogu. The 1975 signed to the label for £20.

The 1975 and Benjamin Francis Leftwich were the company's first signings, with the former becoming the label’s first act to achieve mainstream success by reaching number one on the UK Albums Chart in September 2013 with their eponymous debut album. In February 2019, The 1975 signed a new three-album deal with the label.

In May 2017, the label launched the Dirty Hit Tour, featuring Superfood, King Nun and Pale Waves. Since its inception, Dirty Hit’s releases have been distributed to digital platforms by Ingrooves Music Group.

Since January 2019, the members of The 1975 – Matty Healy, George Daniel, Adam Hann and Ross MacDonald – have been shareholders in the company. Healy served as creative director for four years before stepping down from the role in April 2023.

== DH2 ==
On 17 June 2024, Dirty Hit announced a new imprint label, DH2, focused on electronic music and run by George Daniel of The 1975. Artists signed to the label include Kelly Lee Owens, Oscar Farrel and TimFromTheHouse. Owens's album Dreamstate, released on 18 October, was her debut for the label.

== International expansion ==
Dirty Hit expanded its presence beyond the UK market through growing critical acclaim and a strong social media presence. Following the success of artists such as The 1975, the label gained increased attention for signing younger acts including Beabadoobee and Rina Sawayama. This led to the opening of new offices in the United States and Australia in 2020.

The label partnered with Ingrooves (now folded into Virgin Music Group) to support international distribution and marketing efforts. Ingrooves provides digital marketing services, analytics, rights management and promotional tools for independent labels and artists. The partnership was made official in late 2019.

Two notable members of Dirty Hit’s international team are Greg Carr and Rachel Jones-Williams. Carr joined the Los Angeles office in May 2020, and has been credited by Oborne with bringing significant expertise to the company. Jones-Williams, based in Sydney, also joined during the same period.

== Awards and accolades ==
Notable artists affiliated with Dirty Hit Records include Wolf Alice, The 1975, Beabadoobee, and Pale Waves, who have garnered nominations or awards including the Grammys, NME, and the Brits. The 1975, a flagship act of Dirty Hit, stands out with two nominations for the esteemed Mercury Prize. Dirty Hit's artists have collectively made a significant impact on the global music scene by performing at renowned festivals. The 1975 also headlined Radio 1's Big Weekend, bridging contemporary work and Dirty Hit's alternative style in mainstream media.

No Rome, an artist under the Dirty Hit banner, achieved a historic milestone by becoming the first Filipino act to perform at the summer Coachella festival. In 2019, Dirty Hit Records achieved notable success at the Music Week Awards. The label, alongside contenders such as Atlantic Records, Columbia Records, Island Records, Polydor Records, and Warner Bros Records, received recognition for its contributions. In 2019, the label was nominated for 3 awards. The label was able to win the "Best Independent Label" award.

== Notable artists ==
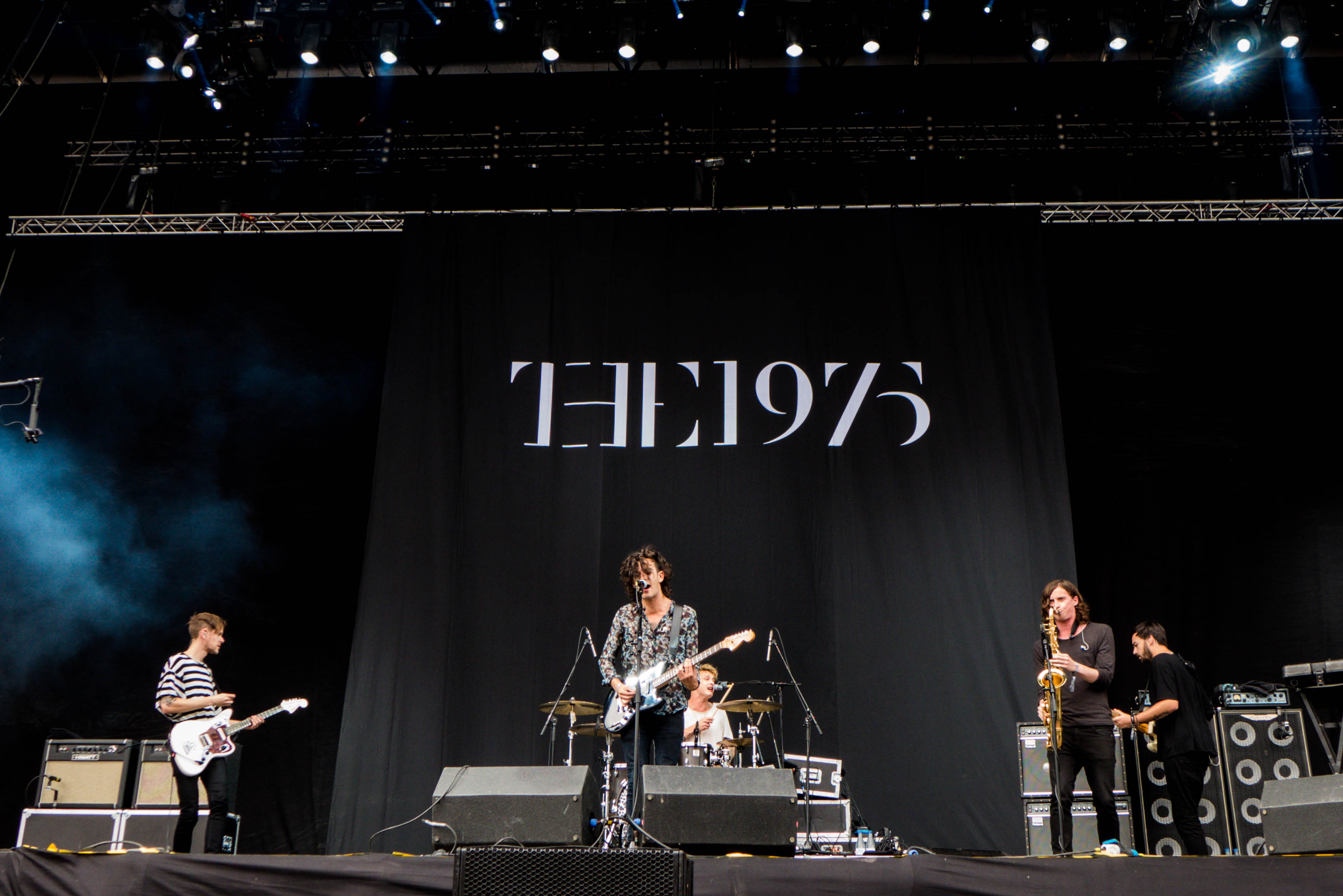
The 1975, known in 2010 as Drive Like I Do, is the main reason co-founder Jamie Oborne set up Dirty Hit

- The 1975
- Deaton Chris Anthony
- Jack Antonoff / Bleachers
- beabadoobee
- Benjamin Francis Leftwich
- Blackstarkids
- Frost Children
- The Japanese House
- Lava La Rue
- Lowertown
- No Rome
- Kelly Lee Owens
- Pale Waves
- Pretty Sick
- Rina Sawayama
- Saya Gray
- Been Stellar
- Untitled (halo)

=== Former ===
- Marika Hackman
- Little Comets
- QTY
- Caleb Steph
- Wallice
- Wolf Alice
