= Faithless discography =

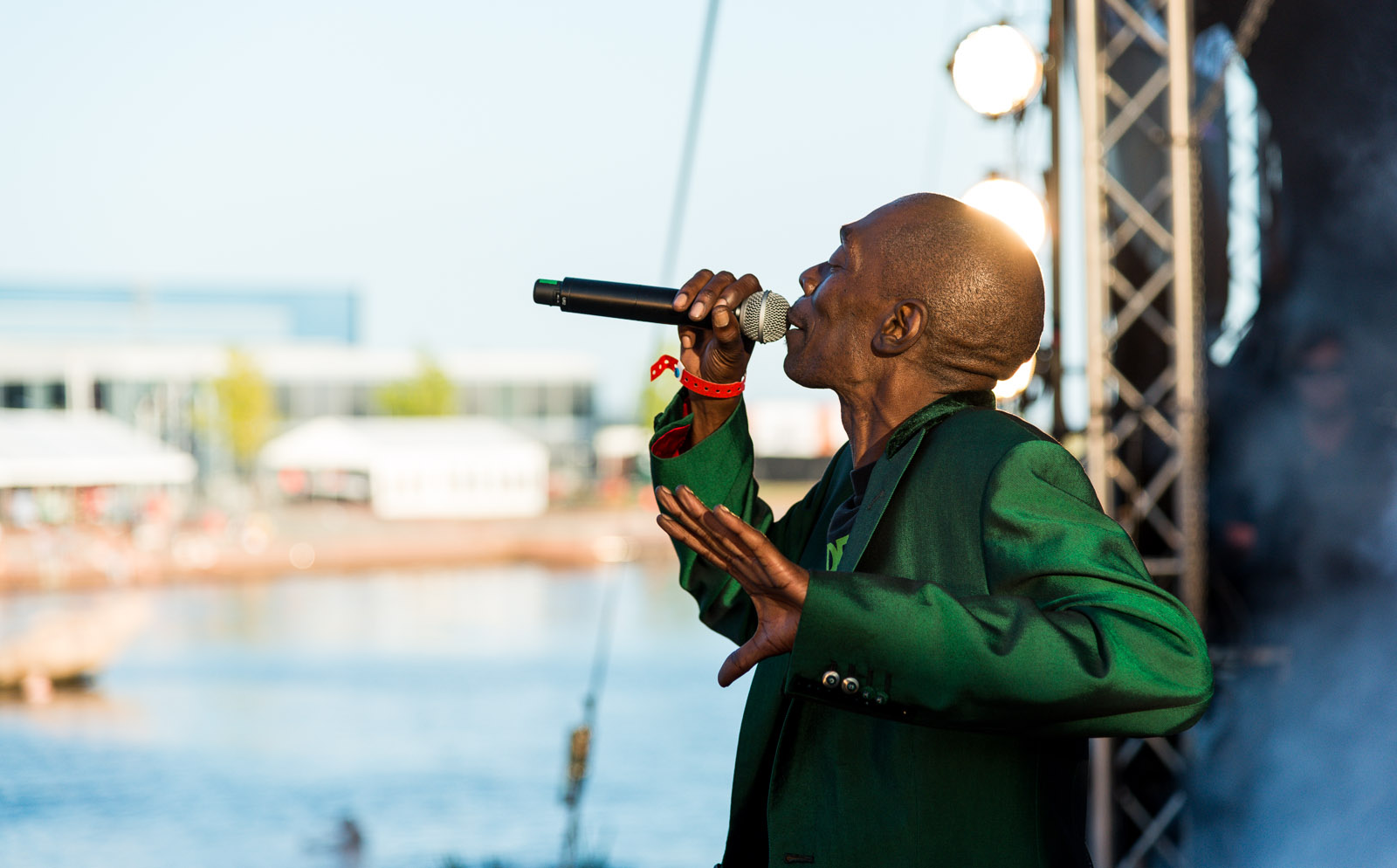
- Faithless live at Palmesus 2013
- Studio albums: 8
- Compilation albums: 3
- Singles: 39
- Remix albums: 6

The discography of Faithless, a British electronic band, consists of eight studio albums, four remix albums, three compilation albums, thirty-nine singles and a number of other appearances. They are perhaps best known for their 1995 hit single "Insomnia"; it was voted by Mixmag readers as the fifth greatest dance record of all time in 2013, was certified triple platinum by the British Phonographic Industry (BPI) in 2023, with sales of over 1.8 million.

As of September 2025, Faithless have released eight studio albums: Reverence (1996), Sunday 8PM (1998), Outrospective (2001), No Roots (2004), To All New Arrivals (2006), The Dance (2010), All Blessed (2020), and Champion Sound (2025). Champion Sound was preceded by four singles: "Find a Way", "I'm Not Alone (Rest Well Maxwell)", "Peace and Noise" and "Dollars and Dimes".

Faithless have sold over 15 million records worldwide. They have scored three UK number ones: studio album No Roots, 2010 remix album Faithless 2.0, and compilation album Forever Faithless – The Greatest Hits (2005).

In 2019, Faithless member Rollo Armstrong started a separate project under the alias R Plus, with some online streaming services erroneously listing Faithless as a collaborative artist on R Plus' releases. Rollo's sister, Dido has collaborated frequently with the band, including 2002 hit "One Step Too Far", which charted in thirteen countries.

== Albums ==
=== Studio albums ===
List of albums, with selected chart positions, sales, and certifications
Title	Album details	Peak chart positions										Certifications
Title	Album details	UK	AUS	AUT	GER	IRE	NLD	NZ	NOR	SWI	US Dance	Certifications
Reverence	Released: 15 April 1996; Label: Cheeky (#CHEKLP 500); Formats: Vinyl, CD, cassette	26	51	26	17	71	45	17	7	18	—	BPI: Platinum
Sunday 8PM	Released: 28 September 1998; Label: Cheeky (#CHEKLP 503); Formats: Vinyl, CD, cassette	10	41	23	6	59	7	21	4	9	—	BPI: Gold
Outrospective	Released: 18 June 2001; Label: Cheeky (#74321862802); Formats: Vinyl, CD, cassette	4	11	17	3	5	2	26	2	4	9	BPI: Platinum
No Roots	Released: 7 June 2004; Label: Cheeky (#82876618702); Formats: Vinyl, CD, digital download	1	23	26	12	18	3	—	17	10	4	BPI: Gold
To All New Arrivals	Released: 27 November 2006; Label: Columbia (#88697027612); Formats: Vinyl, CD, digital download	30	—	73	70	34	29	—	—	11	—	BPI: Gold
The Dance	Released: 17 May 2010; Label: Nate's Tunes (#NATE1004CD); Formats: Vinyl (Box set), CD, digital download	2	28	34	10	83	6	40	40	4	—	BPI: Gold
All Blessed	Released: 23 October 2020; Label: Nate's Tunes; Formats: Vinyl, CD, digital download, streaming	6	—	—	44	74	46	—	—	20	—	
Champion Sound	Released: 5 September 2025; Label: Nate's Tunes; Formats: Vinyl, CD, digital download, streaming	15	—	—	—	—	—	—	—	—	—	
"—" denotes album that did not chart or was not released

=== Remix albums ===
Title	Album details	Peak chart positions						Certifications
Title	Album details	UK	AUS	BEL	GER	NLD	SWI	Certifications
Reverence / Irreverence	Released: 11 November 1996; Label: Cheeky; Formats: CD, cassette	— (Note: Reverence/Irreverence did not enter the UK Albums Chart, but peaked at number 9 on the UK Dance Albums Chart in 2023.)	—	—	—	—	—	
Sunday 8PM / Saturday 3AM	Released: 25 October 1999; Label: Cheeky; Formats: CD, cassette	—	—	—	—	—	—	
Outrospective / Reperspective	Released: 26 August 2002; Label: Cheeky; Formats: CD, cassette	64	—	—	—	—	—	
Everything Will Be Alright Tomorrow	Released: 31 August 2004; Label: Cheeky; Formats: CD, cassette	—	—	—	—	—	—	
The Dance Never Ends	Released: 1 November 2010; Label: Nate's Tunes; Formats: CD, cassette	— (Note: The Dance Never Ends did not enter the UK Albums Chart, but peaked at number 40 on the UK Dance Albums Chart.)	—	—	—	—	—	
Faithless 2.0	Released: 9 October 2015; Label: Nate's Tunes; Formats: CD, download	1	73	4	50	10	16	BPI: Silver

=== Compilation albums ===
Title	Album details	Peak chart positions									Sales	Certifications
Title	Album details	UK	AUS	AUT	BEL	FIN	GER	NLD	NZ	SWI	Sales	Certifications
Forever Faithless – The Greatest Hits	Released: May 2005; Label: Cheeky; Formats: CD, cassette	1	32	22	1	15	9	3	34	5	UK: 1,381,407	BPI: 4× Platinum
Faithless – Renaissance 3D	Released: 10 July 2006; Label: Renaissance; Formats: CD, cassette	—	—	—	—	—	—	—	—	—		
Insomnia: The Best of Faithless	Released: 9 March 2009; Label: Sony BMG; Formats: CD, cassette	67	—	—	—	—	—	—	—	—		

=== Live albums ===
Year	Album details	Peak chart positions
Year	Album details	UK
Passing the Baton – Live from Brixton	Released: 18 March 2012; Label: Nates Tunes; Formats: CD, digital download	43 (Note: Passing the Baton - Live from Brixton also peaked at numbers 18 and 7 on the UK Dance and UK Independent Albums charts, respectively.)

== Singles ==
Year	Title	Peak chart positions										Certifications (sales thresholds)	Album
Year	Title	UK	AUS	AUT	BEL	FIN	GER	IRE	NLD	SWI	US	Certifications (sales thresholds)	Album
1995	"Salva Mea"	9	—	9	32	—	5	8	22	1	—	BVMI: Gold	Reverence
1995	"Insomnia"	3	16	5	2	1	2	3	12	1	62	BPI: 3× Platinum; ARIA: Gold; BVMI: Platinum	Reverence
1996	"Don't Leave"	21	73	—	63	—	72	—	45	38	—		Reverence
1997	"Reverence"	10	—	—	—	15	—	—	55	—	—		Reverence
1998	"God Is a DJ"	6	37	9	4	6	2	11	1	2	—	BPI: Platinum; BVMI: Gold	Sunday 8PM
1998	"Take the Long Way Home"	15	73	36	37	—	56	—	43	50	—		Sunday 8PM
1998	"Why Go?" (featuring Boy George)	—	—	—	—	—	—	—	65	—	—		Sunday 8PM
1999	"Bring My Family Back"	14	—	—	52	—	48	—	44	39	—		Sunday 8PM
2001	"We Come 1"	3	62	29	9	4	17	6	2	16	—		Outrospective
2001	"Muhammad Ali"	29	—	—	54	—	87	43	70	—	—		Outrospective
2001	"Tarantula"	29	40	—	49	18	92	42	22	89	—		Outrospective
2002	"One Step Too Far" (featuring Dido)	6	21	—	56	—	48	8	37	51	—		Outrospective
2004	"Mass Destruction"	7	43	—	24	—	63	18	40	43	—		No Roots
2004	"I Want More"	22	64	—	18	—	81	30	8	96	—		No Roots
2004	"Miss U Less, See U More"	—	—	—	48	—	93	—	51	—	—		No Roots
2005	"Why Go?" (re-release; featuring Estelle)	49	—	61	—	18	90	24	52	—	—		Forever Faithless: Greatest Hits
2005	"Insomnia" (2005 remix)	17	—	40	66	—	37	8	56	29	—		Forever Faithless: Greatest Hits
2006	"Bombs"	26	—	—	47	15	—	45	47	74	—		To All New Arrivals
2007	"Music Matters" (featuring Cassandra Fox)	38	—	—	—	—	—	—	—	—	—		To All New Arrivals
2007	"A Kind of Peace"	—	—	—	—	—	—	—	—	—	—		To All New Arrivals
2010	"Sun to Me"	—	—	—	20	—	—	—	—	39	—		The Dance
2010	"Not Going Home"	42	—	—	6	—	63	—	—	—	—		The Dance
2010	"Tweak Your Nipple"	— (Note: "Tweak Your Nipple" did not enter the UK Singles Chart but peaked at number 33 on the UK Dance Singles Chart.)	—	—	—	—	—	—	—	—	—		The Dance
2010	"Feelin' Good" (featuring Dido)	— (Note: "Feelin' Good" did not enter the UK Singles Chart but peaked at number 23 on the UK Dance Singles Chart.)	—	—	88	—	—	—	—	—	—		The Dance
2015	"Insomnia 2.0"	—	—	58	97	—	—	—	—	—	—		Faithless 2.0
2020	"Let the Music Decide"	—	—	—	—	—	—	—	—	—	—		Non-album single
2020	"This Feeling" (featuring Suli Breaks and Nathan Ball)	—	—	—	—	—	—	—	—	—	—		All Blessed (Deluxe Edition)
2020	"Synthesizer" (featuring Nathan Ball)	—	—	—	—	—	—	—	—	—	—		All Blessed
2020	"Innadadance" (featuring Suli Breaks and Jazzie B)	—	—	—	—	—	—	—	—	—	—		All Blessed
2021	"Everybody Everybody"	—	—	—	—	—	—	—	—	—	—		All Blessed (Deluxe Edition)
2021	"In Those Times" (featuring Nathan Ball and Suli Breaks)	—	—	—	—	—	—	—	—	—	—		All Blessed (Deluxe Edition)
2022	"Main Title (The Crown Soundtrack)" (remix)	—	—	—	—	—	—	—	—	—	—		Non-album singles
2023	"Life Is a Melody" (with Sister Bliss, Hyacinth and Apollo)	—	—	—	—	—	—	—	—	—	—		Non-album singles
2024	"Find a Way" (featuring Suli Breaks)	—	—	—	—	—	—	—	—	—	—		Champion Sound
2024	"I'm Not Alone (Rest Well Maxwell)" (featuring Amelia Fox and LSK)	—	—	—	—	—	—	—	—	—	—		Non-album single
2025	"Peace and Noise" (featuring Suli Breaks)	—	—	—	—	—	—	—	—	—	—		Champion Sound
2025	"Dollars and Dimes" (featuring Bebe Rexha)	—	—	—	—	—	—	—	—	—	—		Champion Sound
2026	"New Religion" (with Bebe Rexha)	41	—	21	12	—	12	62	30	26	—	BPI: Silver	Dirty Blonde
"—" denotes the single failed to chart or was not released.

=== Promotional singles ===
Year	Title	Peak chart positions	Album
Year	Title	IRE	Album
2007	"I Won't Stop"	37	Non-album singles
2025	"Find a Way" (featuring Dido and Suli Breaks)	—	Non-album singles

== Other charted songs ==
Year	Title	Peak chart positions	Album
Year	Title	UK	Album
2009	"Drifting Away"	98	Reverence

== Other appearances ==
=== Films ===
Year	Title	Songs	Notes
1997	Chasing Amy	"Insomnia (Monster Mix)"	
1997	A Life Less Ordinary	"Don't Leave", "If Lovin' You is Wrong"	
1998	A Night at the Roxbury	"Insomnia"	
1998	Cruel Intentions	"Addictive"	
1998	Forces of Nature	"Bring My Family Back", "If Lovin' You is Wrong"	
1999	Entrapment	"Hour of Need"	
1999	Wonderland	"Don't Leave"	
1999	Strange Planet	"Hour of Need"	
2000	The Beach	"Woozy"	
2001	High Heels and Low Lifes	"We Come One"	
2003	Haggard: The Movie	"The Garden", "Sunday 8PM"	

=== Television ===
Year	Title	Songs	Notes
1997	New York Undercover	"Reverence"	Episode: "Vendetta"
1999	Hinter Gittern - Der Frauenknast	"Insomnia"	Episode: "Partner fürs Leben"
2002–2004	Smallville	"I Want More: Part 2", "God Is a DJ"	Episodes: "Bound" and "Zero"
2004	Peace One Day	"Salva Mea"	
2005	Entourage	"We Come One"	Episode: "Chinatown"
2005	Sleeper Cell	"God Is a DJ"	Episode: "Immigrant"
2006	Murder City	"One Step Too Far"	Episode: "Wives and Lovers"
2010	Radio 1's Big Weekend	"God Is a DJ", "Insomnia"	Episodes: "Radio 1's Big Weekend: The Best Bits" and "Dizzee Rascal and Florence & the Machine @ R1BW"
2010	T in the Park 2010	"Insomnia", "We Come One", "Happy", "Sun to Me", "God Is a DJ", "Mass Destruction" and "Insomnia"	Episodes: "Highlights", "Black Eyed Peas" and "Florence & the Machine/Faithless"
2010	iTunes Festival London 2010	"Not Going Home", "Mass Destruction"	
2022	Tokyo Vice	"Insomnia"	Episode: "Sometimes They Disappear"

=== Video games ===
Year	Title	Songs	Notes
2001	WRC	"Speed"	
2005	FIFA 2005	"No Roots"	
2007	Forza Motorsport 2	"Insomnia"	
2012	Lumines Electronic Symphony	"Flyin' Hi"	

== Music videos ==
Year	Title
1995	"Insomnia"
1996	"Don't Leave"
1996	"Salva Mea"
1996	"If Lovin' You Is Wrong"
1997	"Reverence"
1998	"God Is a DJ"
1998	"Take the Long Way Home"
1999	"Bring My Family Back"
2001	"We Come 1"
2001	"Muhammad Ali"
2001	"Tarantula"
2002	"One Step Too Far"
2004	"Mass Destruction"
2004	"I Want More"
2005	"Miss U Less, See U More"
2005	"Why Go?" (featuring Estelle)
2006	"Bombs"
2006	"Music Matters"
2010	"Not Going Home"
2010	"Feelin' Good"
2011	"Tweak Your Nipple"
2011	"Sun to Me"
2020	"This Feeling"
2020	"Synthesizer"
2024	"Find A Way" (ft Suli Breaks)
2025	"Find A Way" (ft Suli Breaks & Dido)

== DVDs ==
- Live at the Melkweg Amsterdam (2001)
- Forever Faithless – The Greatest Hits (16 May 2005)
- Live at Alexandra Palace (October 2005)
- Faithless – Live in Moscow (Filmed in 2007, Released on DVD, 17 November 2008)
