= Insomnia: The Best of Faithless =

Greatest hits album by Faithless
- Released: 9 March 2009
- Genre: Electronica
- Length: 146:24
- Label: Sony BMG
- Producer: Rollo Armstrong

Faithless chronology
To All New Arrivals (2006)	Insomnia: The Best of Faithless (2009)	The Dance (2010)

Professional ratings
Review scores
Source	Rating
AllMusic	3.5/5 stars
ARTISTdirect	3.5/5 stars
Gigwise	3/5 stars

Insomnia: The Best of Faithless is a greatest hits two-disc compilation album from the dance music group Faithless.

== Track listing ==
No.	Title	Original album	Length
1.	"We Come 1"	Outrospective (2001)	8:15
2.	"Baseball Cap"	Reverence (1996)	2:55
3.	"Don't Leave"	Reverence	4:00
4.	"God Is a DJ"	Sunday 8PM (1998)	8:01
5.	"Swingers"	No Roots (2004)	3:48
6.	"One Step Too Far" (featuring Dido)	Outrospective	5:21
7.	"In the End"	No Roots	4:11
8.	"I Want More – Part 1"	No Roots	2:49
9.	"I Want More – Part 2"	No Roots	3:11
10.	"Miss U Less, See U More"	No Roots	3:42
11.	"Angeline" (Innocents Mix)	Reverence	1:48
12.	"Salva Mea" (Way Out West Remix)	Reverence	7:47
13.	"Giving Myself Away"	Outrospective	4:38
14.	"Two"	Everything Will Be Alright Tomorrow (2004)	4:34
15.	"The Garden"	Sunday 8PM	4:28

No.	Title	Original album	Length
1.	"Insomnia"	Reverence	8:43
2.	"She's My Baby"	Sunday 8PM	5:49
3.	"Bluegrass"	No Roots	2:45
4.	"Bring My Family Back"	Sunday 8PM	6:22
5.	"Reverence"	Reverence	7:41
6.	"Drifting Away"	Reverence	4:08
7.	"Evergreen"	Outrospective	4:35
8.	"Donny X"	Outrospective	4:08
9.	"Killers Lullaby" (Nightmares on Wax Mix)	Sunday 8PM	5:26
10.	"Take the Long Way Home"	Sunday 8PM	7:13
11.	"Not Enuff Love"	Outrospective	5:55
12.	"Postcards" (Rewritten Mix)	Sunday 8PM	3:30
13.	"Six"	Everything Will Be Alright Tomorrow	2:23
14.	"Hem of His Garment"	Sunday 8PM	4:07
15.	"Daimoku"	Outrospective / Reperspective (2002)	4:11

== Charts ==
Chart (2010)	Peak position
UK Albums (OCC)	67
