= Forever Faithless – The Greatest Hits =

Album by Faithless

Greatest hits album by Faithless
- Released: 16 May 2005
- Recorded: Various
- Genres: Trip hop; EDM
- Length: 75:26
- Labels: Cheeky (UK); Arista (US); Sony BMG
- Producer: Rollo Armstrong

Faithless chronology
Everything Will Be Alright Tomorrow (2004)	Forever Faithless – The Greatest Hits (2005)	Faithless – Renaissance 3D (2006)

Forever Faithless – The Greatest Hits is a greatest hits compilation album by the English dance music group Faithless, which was released on 16 May 2005. It features all their released singles (other than "Take the Long Way Home"), plus three additional new tracks ("Fatty Boo", "Reasons (Saturday Night)", and "Why Go?" (2005 remix featuring Estelle).

== Chart performance ==
Professional ratings
Review scores
Source	Rating
AllMusic	link
ARTISTdirect	link
Deo2	link
Gigwise	link

Forever Faithless was the best selling dance album of 2005. It has sold 1,381,407 copies as of October 2015. After the death of Faithless member Maxi Jazz in December 2022, Forever Faithless entered the UK Album Downloads Chart at number 7.

== Track listing ==
=== UK version ===
No.	Title	Original album	Length
1.	"Insomnia" (Monster Mix)	Reverence (1996)	8:42
2.	"Mass Destruction"	No Roots (2004)	3:33
3.	"God Is a DJ"	Sunday 8PM (1998)	3:29
4.	"Don't Leave" (featuring Pauline Taylor and Dido)	Reverence	3:59
5.	"Muhammad Ali" (Radio Edit)	Outrospective (2001)	3:31
6.	"We Come 1"	Outrospective	3:44
7.	"Reverence"	Reverence	3:44
8.	"Salva Mea"	Reverence	10:51
9.	"One Step Too Far"	Outrospective	3:27
10.	"Bring My Family Back"	Sunday 8PM	4:07
11.	"Miss U Less, See U More" (featuring LSK (musician))	No Roots	3:34
12.	"Tarantula"	Outrospective	6:40
13.	"Fatty Boo" (featuring The Hiites)	previously unreleased	6:00
14.	"Reasons (Saturday Night)" (featuring Ian Dury)	previously unreleased	3:22
15.	"Why Go?" (2005 Remix, featuring Estelle)	previously unreleased	3:24
16.	"I Want More" (featuring Nina Simone)	No Roots	3:32

=== US version ===
Released on Arista Records, the American version of the Forever Faithless CD does not include "Fatty Boo", but is an enhanced disc with a bonus music video of the 2005 version of "Why Go".

Initial US pressings contained MediaMax CD-3 copy protection, but this was abandoned after the 2005 Sony BMG CD copy protection scandal.

=== Song versions ===
Except "Insomnia" and "Salva Mea", the chart versions of each song are included, not the full-length versions. This was necessary to fit all the tracks into 1 hour 20 minutes.

== Charts ==
=== Weekly charts ===
Chart (2005-2007)	Peak position
Australian Albums (ARIA)	32
Austrian Albums (Ö3 Austria)	22
Belgian Albums (Ultratop Flanders)	1
Belgian Albums (Ultratop Wallonia)	3
Dutch Albums (Album Top 100)	3
Finnish Albums (Suomen virallinen lista)	15
German Albums (Offizielle Top 100)	9
Hungarian Albums (MAHASZ)	23
Irish Albums (IRMA)	1
Italian Albums (FIMI)	95
New Zealand Albums (RMNZ)	34
Scottish Albums (Official Charts)	12
Swiss Albums (Schweizer Hitparade)	5
UK Albums (Official Charts)	1
UK Dance Albums (Official Charts)	1

=== Year-end charts ===
Chart (2005)	Position
Belgian Albums (Ultratop Flanders)	5
Belgian Albums (Ultratop Wallonia)	45
Dutch Albums (Album Top 100)	38
UK Albums (OCC)	10

Chart (2006)	Position
UK Albums (OCC)	103

== Certifications ==
Region	Certification	Certified units/sales
Belgium (BRMA)	Platinum	50,000^{*}
Germany (BVMI)	Gold	100,000^{‡}
Ireland (IRMA)	5× Platinum	75,000^{^}
Russia (NFPF)	Gold	10,000^{*}
United Kingdom (BPI)	4× Platinum	1,200,000^{^}
^{*} Sales figures based on certification alone.^{^} Shipments figures based on certification alone.^{‡} Sales+streaming figures based on certification alone.

== DVD ==
Forever Faithless – The Greatest Hits

Video by Faithless
- Released: 16 May 2005
- Genres: Trip hop; EDM
- Length: 59:59
- Labels: Cheeky; Sony BMG
- Producer: Faithless

Faithless chronology
Live at the Melkweg Amsterdam (2001)	Forever Faithless – The Greatest Hits (2005)	Live at Alexandra Palace (2005)

Professional ratings
Review scores
Source	Rating
AllMusic	(not rated) link

Alongside the CD a DVD was also released containing the promotional videos for 12 Faithless singles, but does not include the videos for "Salva Mea '95", "Reverence", "If Lovin' You Is Wrong", "Bring My Family Back" (German version featuring Sabrina Setlur), "Why Go?" (Boy George Version), "Why Go?" (Estelle Version), "Muhammad Ali" (Rollo & Sister Bliss Tuff Love Mix Video) and "Miss U Less, See U More".

=== Track listing ===
No.	Title	Length
1.	"Salva Mea" ('97 video version)	4:08
2.	"Don't Leave" (video version)	3:59
3.	"Insomnia" (video version)	3:36
4.	"God Is a DJ" (video version)	3:29
5.	"Take the Long Way Home" (video version)	3:59
6.	"Bring My Family Back" (UK video version)	4:02
7.	"We Come 1" (video version)	4:02
8.	"Muhammad Ali" (video version)	4:04
9.	"Tarantula" (video version)	3:21
10.	"One Step Too Far" (video version)	3:26
11.	"Mass Destruction" (video version)	3:35
12.	"I Want More" (video version)	3:02
13.	"Hexstatic Video-Mash-Up" (megamix of all previous videos)	15:16
