= Faithless 2.0 =

Remix album by Faithless
- Released: 9 October 2015
- Genres: Trip hop, trance, dance, electronica
- Labels: Nates Tunes, PIAS, Ultra
- Producers: Avicii, Eric Prydz, Armin van Buuren, Rollo Armstrong, Sister Bliss

Faithless chronology
The Dance (2010)	Faithless 2.0 (2015)	All Blessed (2020)

Faithless 2.0 is a remix album by British electronica band Faithless. It features remixes of many of their previous songs, as mixed by Avicii, Eric Prydz and Armin van Buuren. It was released in 2015, five years after their sixth album, The Dance. 2.0 was followed up with Faithless' seventh studio album, All Blessed in 2020.

== Chart performance ==
The album debuted at number 1 on the UK Albums Chart after selling 12,098 copies, the second-lowest for a UK number-one album in the 21st century, beaten only by Rihanna's album Talk That Talk, which sold just 9,578 copies when it returned to number one in August 2012.

== Track listing ==
Side one
No.	Title	Length
1.	"Insomnia 2.0" (Avicii Extended Remix)	6:13
2.	"We Come 1 2.0" (Armin van Buuren Remix)	5:26
3.	"God Is a DJ 2.0" (Tiësto Remix)	4:27
4.	"Muhammad Ali 2.0" (High Contrast Remix)	4:43
5.	"Salva Mea 2.0" (Above & Beyond Remix)	7:02
6.	"Not Going Home 2.0" (Eric Prydz Remix)	8:56
7.	"Music Matters 2.0" (Axwell Remix)	8:23
8.	"I Was There"	6:42
9.	"Miss U Less, See U More 2.0" (Purple Disco Machine Remix)	6:40
10.	"Tarantula 2.0" (Booka Shade Remix)	7:40
11.	"Bombs 2.0" (featuring Harry Collier) (Claptone Remix)	6:58
12.	"Drifting Away 2.0" (Autograf Remix)	5:50
13.	"Don't Leave 2.0" (Until the Ribbon Breaks Remix)	3:33
14.	"Insomnia 2.0" (Avicii Remix) (radio edit)	3:04

Side two
No.	Title	Length
1.	"Insomnia" (Monster Mix)	8:38
2.	"Mass Destruction" (single version)	3:31
3.	"God Is a DJ"	7:55
4.	"Don't Leave"	3:59
5.	"Muhammad Ali" (radio edit)	3:29
6.	"We Come 1" (radio edit)	3:42
7.	"Reverence"	7:37
8.	"Salva Mea"	10:40
9.	"One Step Too Far" (featuring Dido) (radio edit)	3:23
10.	"Bring My Family Back"	6:15
11.	"Tarantula"	6:38
12.	"Bombs" (featuring Harry Collier)	4:55
13.	"Feelin' Good" (featuring Dido)	3:13
14.	"Not Going Home" (radio edit)	3:12

== Charts ==
=== Weekly charts ===
Chart (2015)	Peak position
Australian Albums (ARIA)	73
Belgian Albums (Ultratop Flanders)	4
Belgian Albums (Ultratop Wallonia)	17
Dutch Albums (Album Top 100)	10
German Albums (Offizielle Top 100)	50
Irish Albums (IRMA)	14
Scottish Albums (Official Charts)	1
Swiss Albums (Schweizer Hitparade)	16
UK Albums (Official Charts)	1
UK Dance Albums (Official Charts)	1
US Top Dance Albums (Billboard)	19

=== Year-end charts ===
Chart (2015)	Position
Belgian Albums (Ultratop Flanders)	179
