= Everything Will Be Alright Tomorrow =

Remix album by Faithless
- Released: 30 August 2004
- Genres: Trip hop, dance
- Label: Cheeky Records/BMG
- Producer: Rollo

Faithless chronology
No Roots (2004)	Everything Will Be Alright Tomorrow (2004)	Forever Faithless – The Greatest Hits (2005)

Everything Will Be Alright Tomorrow is a remix album released in August 2004 by the British electronica band Faithless. The group has released remix discs in follow-up to their prior three studio albums (Irreverence for Reverence, Saturday 3AM for Sunday 8PM, and Reperspective for Outrospective) and Everything Will Be Alright Tomorrow follows in that tradition though it is the first to be released on its own. Additionally, rather than containing remixes, it contains instrumental versions of eight tracks from No Roots along with an original recording "Blissy's Groove".

== Track listing ==
No.	Title	Length
1.	"One (No Roots)"	4:49
2.	"Two (Swingers)"	4:33
3.	"Three (Love Lives On My Street)"	2:30
4.	"Four (Bluegrass)"	2:41
5.	"Five (Pastoral)"	4:37
6.	"Six (Everything Will Be Alright Tomorrow)"	2:22
7.	"Seven (I Want More - Part 1)"	4:03
8.	"Eight (In the End)"	3:05
9.	"Blissy's Groove"	9:28
