= All Blessed =

Studio album by Faithless
- Released: 23 October 2020
- Recorded: 2015–2020
- Length: 56:05
- Labels: Nates Tunes; PIAS; Ultra
- Producers: Rollo Armstrong, Sister Bliss

Faithless chronology
Faithless 2.0 (2015)	All Blessed (2020)	Champion Sound (2025)

Singles from All Blessed
- 1. "Synthesizer" Released: 28 August 2020; 2. "Innadadance" Released: 20 October 2020

Professional ratings
Review scores
Source	Rating
The Arts Desk	3/5 stars
MusicOMH	3.5/5 stars
Mxdwn	10/10
The Times	3/5 stars
XS Noize	9/10

All Blessed is the seventh studio album by dance music act Faithless. It was released on 23 October 2020. It is their first studio album in 10 years, succeeding 2010's The Dance. It is also their first album not to feature lead vocalist Maxi Jazz.

== Background ==
On 5 June 2020, the band released two edits of a new song, "Let the Music Decide", which featured the vocals of George the Poet and was only available for a limited time on music streaming platforms.

On 16 July 2020, Faithless released a follow up single, "This Feeling". Similar to "Let The Music Decide", this track also features a spoken poet known as Suli Breaks, with additional vocals by singer-songwriter Nathan Ball.

Another single with Nathan Ball on vocals, "Synthesizer", was released on 28 August 2020 alongside its music video, with an announcement for the release date of 23 October for the band's seventh album "All Blessed". The tracklist however does not feature the previous two singles "Let the Music Decide" and "This Feeling", making "Synthesizer" the album's first official single.

The album's second single "Innadadance" was released 20 October, three days before the album's release. It features Suli Breaks and Jazzie B.

Former vocalist Maxi Jazz is thanked in the album's sleeve notes for "passing the baton".

== Track listing ==
All music is composed by Faithless.

All Blessed
No.	Title	Length
1.	"Poetry" (featuring Suli Breaks)	3:39
2.	"Gains" (featuring Suli Breaks)	3:27
3.	"I Need Someone" (featuring Nathan Ball and Caleb Femi)	4:54
4.	"Remember" (featuring Suli Breaks and LSK)	7:05
5.	"Synthesizer" (featuring Nathan Ball)	6:15
6.	"My Town" (featuring Gaika)	5:54
7.	"What Shall I Do?"	4:26
8.	"Friendship"	2:17
9.	"Walk in My Shoes"	2:44
10.	"All Blessed"	4:38
11.	"Innadadance" (featuring Suli Breaks and Jazzie B)	4:07
12.	"Take Your Time" (featuring Damien Jurado and Suli Breaks)	6:39
Total length:		56:05

== Personnel ==
Faithless

- Sister Bliss – production
- Rollo Armstrong – additional production, keyboards

Additional musicians

- Suli Breaks – guest vocals on tracks 1, 2, 4, 11, 12
- Nathan Ball – guest vocals on tracks 3, 5
- Caleb Femi – guest vocals on track 3
- LSK – guest vocals on track 4
- Gaika – guest vocals on track 6
- Jazzie B – guest vocals on track 11
- Damien Jurado – guest vocals on track 12

== Charts ==
Chart performance for All Blessed
Chart (2020)	Peak position
Belgian Albums (Ultratop Flanders)	22
Belgian Albums (Ultratop Wallonia)	50
Dutch Albums (Album Top 100)	46
German Albums (Offizielle Top 100)	44
Irish Albums (IRMA)	74
Scottish Albums (Official Charts)	6
Swiss Albums (Schweizer Hitparade)	20
UK Albums (Official Charts)	6
UK Album Downloads (Official Charts)	2
UK Dance Albums (Official Charts)	1
UK Independent Albums (Official Charts)	1
