= Faithless – Renaissance 3D =

Renaissance 3D

Compilation album by Faithless
- Released: 10 July 2006
- Length: 227:28
- Label: Renaissance Recordings

Faithless chronology
Forever Faithless - The Greatest Hits (2005)	Renaissance 3D (2006)	To All New Arrivals (2006)

Professional ratings
Review scores
Source	Rating
PopMatters	7/10

Renaissance 3D by Faithless is a 3-compact disc box set, of which each CD has a different theme. The first CD, Studio, includes remixes of both songs by Faithless (of which several were previously unreleased) and others. The second CD, a mix CD called Club, mainly contains uptempo dance songs. Both the first and second CDs are compiled by Faithless member Sister Bliss. The third CD, Home, is compiled by Maxi Jazz and contains less uplifting songs, from genres such as reggae and trip hop.

It is the second Renaissance 3D collection released by the Renaissance club's record label known as Renaissance Recordings, following one by Satoshi Tomiie.

== Track listing ==
=== Disc 1 - Studio ===
1. Faithless - "Salva Mea" (Original Radio Edit)
2. Donna Summer - "I Feel Love" (Rollo & Sister Bliss Monster Remix)
3. Livin' Joy - "Dreamer" (Rollo & Sister Bliss Remix)
4. Faithless - "Woozy" (Edited)
5. Faithless - "Crazy English Summer" (Brothers on a High Mix)
6. Tricky - "For Real" (Rollo & Sister Bliss Remix)
7. Faithless - "Blissy's Groove"
8. Faithless - "Miss U Less, See U More" (Pete Heller Remix)
9. Faithless - "Reasons" (Gold Run Remix)
10. Faithless - "Addictive" (From Cruel Intentions Soundtrack)
11. Black Grape - "Higher" (Rollo & Sister Bliss Remix)
12. 1 Giant Leap featuring Maxi Jazz & Robbie Williams - "My Culture"
13. BBE - "7 Days and 1 Week" (The Rollo & Sister Bliss Remix)
14. Dido - "Worthless"
15. Maxence Cyrin - "Don't You Want Me"

=== Disc 2 - Club ===
1. Re-Touch - "Running Up That Hill" (Club Mix)
2. Mark Flash - "Soul Power (Mike Monday Avec Piano Mix)"
3. Wonderland Avenue - "White Horse"
4. Christopher & Raphael Just - "Popper" (Shinichi Osawa Distortion Disco Edit)
5. Silver 66 - "Carnaval" (Hardsoul's Future Latino Mix)
6. Kid Creme - "The Game" (Kid's Voodoo Dub)
7. Trulz & Robin featuring Baseman - "She's Dancing"
8. Kaito - "Hundred Million Light Years"
9. Oxia - "Change Works"
10. Deep Dish featuring Stevie Nicks - "Dreams" (Axwell Remix)
11. D-Nox - "Seven Hours"
12. Pastaboys Inspiration Manacolda - "Body Resonance"
13. Jody Wisternoff - "Cold Drink Hot Girl"
14. Iba - "Live on the Mainstage" (Loudeast Remix)
15. Coldcut featuring Robert Owens - "Walk a Mile in My Shoes" (Tiga Mix)
16. Audiofly featuring Priscilla - "Circles" (Kinetic Dub)
17. Balazko - "Breakfast"
18. DJ Tarkan - "Ha Pardon" (DJ Tarkan Remix)
19. Coburn - "Give Me Love" (Lutzenkirchen Remix)

=== Disc 3 - Home ===
1. LSK - "The Take Over"
2. Ian Brown - "F.E.A.R."
3. Scritti Politti - "Wood Beez" (Pray Like Aretha Franklin)
4. Grace Jones - "Private Life Drama"
5. Ward 21 - "Petrol"
6. Horace Andy - "Money Money"
7. Frankie Paul - "Worries in the Dance"
8. Jungle Brothers - "Straight Out the Jungle"
9. Joe Cocker - "Woman to Woman"
10. Kool DJ Maxi Jazz - "Grab the Mic"
11. The Real Thing - "Children of the Ghetto"
12. Roots Manuva - "Next Type of Motion"
13. John Martyn - "Go Down Easy"
14. Dwele - "Twuneanunda"
15. Jason Rebello featuring Maxi Jazz - "Summertime"
16. Cassandra Wilson - "Time After Time"
17. Todd Rundgren - "Remember Me"
