= When We Were Young (album) =

Studio album by Dusted
- Released: 8 May 2001
- Recorded: 2000
- Genre: Electronic, ambient
- Length: 59:09
- Label: Go! Beat
- Producer: Rollo Armstrong; Mark Bates

Dusted chronology
When We Were Young (2001)	Safe from Harm (2005)

Professional ratings
Review scores
Source	Rating
AllMusic	4/5 stars
Under the Radar	8/10

When We Were Young is the debut release from Dusted. It was originally issued in 2000 in limited form on the Go Beat dance imprint of Go! Discs, before being re-released in 2001.

== Track listing ==
1. "Childhood —" – 5:31
2. "Time Takes Time —" – 5:41
3. "Want U —" – 6:50
4. "Hurt U —" – 1:45
5. "If You Go Down to the Woods —" – 3:17
6. "Always Remember to Respect Your Mother, Pt. 1 —" – 3:49
7. "The Biggest Fool in the World —" – 6:47
8. "Oh, How Sweet —" – 5:02
9. "Always Remember to Respect Your Mother, Pt. 2 —" – 4:01
10. "Winter —" – 4:33
11. "The Oscar Song —" – 2:11
12. "Under the Sun —" – 5:36
13. "If I Had a Child —" – 3:31
14. "Always Remember to Respect and Honour Your Mother" (remix) – 6:35
