= Safe from Harm =

Studio album by Dusted
- Released: September 28, 2005
- Length: 49:21
- Label: Sony BMG
- Producer: Rollo Armstrong; Mark Bates

Dusted chronology
When We Were Young (2001)	Safe from Harm (2005)

Professional ratings
Review scores
Source	Rating
Rock Something	link
The Independent	link

Safe from Harm is the second album from the musical duo Dusted, which was released in 2005. It was a reworking of the duo's 2001 debut, and was accompanied by an 80-page, illustrated hardcover book with the same name.

== Track listing ==
1. "In the Beginning" – 4:06
2. "Time Takes Time" – 5:28
3. "Hurt U" – 2:31
4. "Always Remember to Respect & Honour Your Mother, Part 1" – 4:08
5. "Rest" – 2:57
6. "Biggest Fool in the World" – 3:30
7. "Always Remember to Respect & Honour Your Mother, Part 2" – 4:19
8. "Winter" – 5:32
9. "Oscar Song" – 2:04
10. "In Memoriam" – 1:18
11. "Under the Sun" – 5:13
12. "If I Had Child" – 8:15
