= Mass Destruction (song) =

2004 single by Faithless

- Cover

Single by Faithless

from the album No Roots
- Released: 31 May 2004
- Length: 3:44
- Label: Cheeky, BMG
- Songwriters: Rollo Armstrong, Maxwell Fraser, Ayalah Deborah Bentovim, John "P*nut" Harrison
- Producers: P*nut, Sister Bliss

Faithless singles chronology
"One Step Too Far" (2002)	"Mass Destruction" (2004)	"I Want More" (2004)

Mass Destruction is the first single from the fourth album by British electronic music band Faithless, No Roots (2004). It was released on 31 May 2004 and reached number seven on the UK Singles Chart. In Australia, the song was ranked number 41 on Triple J's Hottest 100 of 2004.

Dave Grohl of Nirvana and Foo Fighters cited "Mass Destruction" as the song he most wished he had written during an interview with Q magazine.

== Track listings ==
UK CD single

1. "Mass Destruction" (single mix) – 3:32
2. "Mass Destruction" (Paul Jackson's Big Weapon Mix) – 7:29
3. "Mass Destruction" (Tom Middleton Cosmos Mix) – 7:52
4. "Mass Destruction" (Paul Jackson's Destruction Dub) – 6:57
5. "Mass Destruction" (Tom Middleton Cosmos Dub) – 7:52

UK and Dutch low-price CD single

1. "Mass Destruction" (single mix) – 3:32
2. "We Come 1" – 3:43

European and Australian single

1. "Mass Destruction" (single mix) – 3:32
2. "Mass Destruction" (Paul Jackson's Big Weapon Mix) – 7:29
3. "Mass Destruction" (Tom Middleton Cosmos Mix) – 7:52
4. "Mass Destruction" (video) – 3:36

== Charts ==
=== Weekly charts ===
Chart (2004)	Peak position
Australia (ARIA)	43
Belgium (Ultratop 50 Flanders)	24
Belgium (Ultratip Bubbling Under Wallonia)	7
Germany (GfK)	63
Hungary (Editors' Choice Top 40)	33
Hungary (Single Top 40)	5
Ireland (IRMA)	18
Ireland Dance (IRMA)	2
Netherlands (Dutch Top 40)	40
Netherlands (Single Top 100)	39
Scottish Singles Sales (Official Charts)	8
Switzerland (Schweizer Hitparade)	43
UK Singles (Official Charts)	7
UK Dance (Official Charts)	2

=== Year-end charts ===
Chart (2004)	Position
UK Singles (OCC)	144
