= I Want More (Faithless song) =

2004 single by Faithless

- UK CD2; art by Jess

Single by Faithless

from the album No Roots
- Released: 23 August 2004
- Genre: Trance
- Length: 26:25
- Label: Cheeky, BMG
- Songwriters: Rollo Armstrong, Maxwell Fraser, Ayalah Deborah Bentovim, Holiday
- Producer: Rollo

Faithless singles chronology
"Mass Destruction" (2004)	"I Want More" (2004)	"Miss U Less, See U More" (2004)

Alternative covers
- UK CD1; art by Jess

Alternative cover
- UK 12-inch cover; art by Jess

"I Want More" is a song recorded by UK dance group Faithless, released as a single on 23 August 2004. It features a vocal sample from the singer and pianist Nina Simone (from "Tell Me More and More and Then Some" on the 1965 album Pastel Blues). Also sampled in the intro and outro is an excerpt from Pink Floyd’s "On the Run", from the 1970s album The Dark Side of the Moon.

The album version, featured on No Roots, was released on 7 June 2004 and was split into two parts. The second most closely resembles the later-released single, with vocals from Maxi Jazz and Nina Simone. The first part features vocals from LSK who collaborated with Faithless for many tracks on the album. The single was released progressively as a 3-part set in the Netherlands with releases coming on 23 August, 6 September, and 20 September 2004.

Each single cover image was a detail from Arkadia's Last Resort; or, Fête Champêtre Up Mnemosyne Creek by Jess.

Two music videos were made for the song: One version was filmed in Brazil, while another version features excerpts from the documentary A State of Mind.

== Sample ==
"I Want More" excerpt

== Track listings ==
=== UK / EU Low Price Single ===
1. I Want More (Single version)
2. God is a DJ

=== UK / EU Enhanced CD Single ===
1. I Want More (Single version) - 3:31
2. I Want More (Beginerz mix) - 7:50
3. I Want More (Filterheads Mix) - 7:35
4. I Want More (Faithless main mix) - 7:29
5. I Want More (Video)

=== UK 12" release ===
1. I Want More (Faithless Main Mix) - 07:28
2. I Want More (Beginerz Remix) - 07:52

=== Netherlands Release 1 - CD ===
1. I Want More (Radio Version) - 03:32
2. I Want More (Beginerz Remix) - 07:52
3. I Want More (Filterheadz Remix) - 07:36
4. I Want More (Faithless Main Mix) - 07:28

=== Netherlands Release 2 - DVD ===
1. I Want More (Clip) [Video Version] - 03:04
2. I Want More Part I (Live @ BNN Popsecret 2004) - 03:31
3. God Is A DJ (Live @ BNN Popsecret 2004) - 03:48
4. We Come 1 (Live @ BNN Popsecret 2004) - 03:30

=== Netherlands Release 3 - CD ===
1. I Want More (Single Version) - 03:32
2. Insomnia (Live @ Lowlands 2004) - 05:56
3. Bring My Family Back (Live @ Lowlands 2004) - 04:45
4. Mass Destruction (Live @ Lowlands 2004) - 04:19

== Charts ==
=== Weekly charts ===
Chart (2004)	Peak position
Belgium (Ultratop 50 Flanders)	18
Belgium (Ultratip Bubbling Under Wallonia)	8
Germany (GfK)	81
Netherlands (Dutch Top 40)	8
Netherlands (Single Top 100)	6
Switzerland (Schweizer Hitparade)	96
UK Singles (Official Charts)	22

=== Year-end charts ===
Chart (2004)	Position
Netherlands (Dutch Top 40)	78
