= Bombs (song) =

Single by Faithless

from the album To All New Arrivals
- Released: 20 November 2006
- Genre: Trip hop, electronica, acid house
- Length: 4:58
- Label: Cheeky Records/BMG
- Songwriter(s): Rollo Armstrong, Maxwell Fraser, Ayalah Deborah Bentovim, Harry Collier
- Producer(s): Rollo Armstrong

Faithless singles chronology
"Reasons (Saturday Night)" (2005)	"Bombs" (2006)	"Music Matters" (2007)

"Bombs" is a song recorded by Faithless, released as the first single from their fifth studio album To All New Arrivals. It features Harry Collier from Kubb. The single was released as a download on 23 October 2006 and was later released on CD and 12" on 20 November 2006, one week before the release of the album.

== Music video ==
The video to the song shows scenes of everyday life contrasted and combined with footage of war. It was banned by MTV authorities due to its content.

== Charts ==
Weekly chart performance for "Bombs"
Chart (2006)	Peak position
Finland (Suomen virallinen lista)	15
Romania (Romanian Top 100)	49
UK Singles (OCC)	26

== Track listing ==
=== CD ===
1. Bombs (Edit)
2. Bombs (Benny Benassi Remix)
3. Bombs (X-Press 2's TNT Vocal Mix)

=== 12" (1) ===
1. Bombs (X-Press 2 Remix)
2. Bombs (X-Press 2 Dub)

=== 12" (2) ===
1. Bombs (Benny Benassi Remix)
2. Bombs (Benny Benassi Dub)
