= To All New Arrivals =

Studio album by Faithless
- Released: 27 November 2006
- Genres: Trip hop; electronica
- Length: 55:09
- Labels: Cheeky; Columbia
- Producer: Faithless

Faithless chronology
Renaissance 3D (2006)	To All New Arrivals (2006)	Insomnia: The Best of Faithless (2009)

Professional ratings
Review scores
Source	Rating
AllMusic	2.5/5 stars
Drowned in Sound	6/10
Evening Standard	3/5 stars
Gigwise	3.5/5 stars
The Guardian	3/5 stars
The Independent	2/5 stars
MusicOMH	2/5 stars
NME	5/10
The Observer	3/5 stars
The Skinny	3/5 stars

To All New Arrivals is the fifth studio album by dance music act Faithless. The album was created after the positive response to the Faithless Greatest Hits tour, originally described as their "final tour". The album was released on 27 November 2006, a week after the single "Bombs". The title for the album was inspired by the recent birth of two babies to band members Rollo and Sister Bliss. The album cover features the 1880 oil painting, Nightfall on the Thames, by John Atkinson Grimshaw.

The album was supported by a tour of all of the United Kingdom's major arenas, which began in Nottingham on 17 March 2007. It entered the UK Albums Chart at number 30 for the week ending 3 December 2006. Given that their previous studio album, No Roots, entered the charts at number 1, this position was seen as a disappointment.

== Album information ==
Lead singer Maxi Jazz loved the title, partly due to his Buddhist faith and partly due to his parents being new arrivals to the UK in the 1950s.

The tagline for the album are lyrics taken from the song "Music Matters":

For all those who stood up and were counted,
For all those for whom money was no motive,
For all those for whom music was a message,
I want to thank you.

The track "Spiders, Crocodiles & Kryptonite" features the vocals of Robert Smith of English rock band The Cure, as well as a sample and a section of arrangement from The Cure hit "Lullaby".

Unlike the original versions of Faithless' previous studio albums, initially this album was not released in the United States. A deluxe version later appeared on the US iTunes Store on 4 November 2007.

== Track listing ==
1. "Bombs" (featuring Harry Collier) – 4:58
2. "Spiders, Crocodiles & Kryptonite" (featuring Robert Smith) – 5:40
3. "Music Matters" (featuring Cass Fox) – 4:36
4. "Nate's Tune" – 2:14
5. "I Hope" – 5:27
6. "Last This Day" (featuring Dido) – 5:09
7. "To All New Arrivals" (featuring Harry Collier) – 5:02
8. "Hope & Glory" (featuring One eskimO and John Reid) – 5:00
9. "A Kind of Peace" (featuring Cat Power) – 4:14
10. "The Man in You" (featuring LSK) – 5:06
11. "Emergency" – 7:43

=== iTunes US deluxe edition bonus tracks ===
Includes all original tracks (above), plus the following:

12. "A Kind of Peace" (Sister Bliss & Rollo Slow Radio Edit) – 3:12
13. "A Kind of Peace" (Sister Bliss & Rollo Full Club Vocal) – 7:56
14. "Music Matters" (Axwell Remix) – 8:31
15. "Bombs" (Benny Benassi) – 7:41

This version also includes a digital booklet and the videos for "Bombs" and "Music Matters".

=== Japanese edition bonus tracks ===
12. "Bombs" (Benny Benassi Mix) – 7:41
13. "Bombs" (X Press 2's TNT Vocal Mix) – 7:08

== Personnel ==
- Maxi Jazz - vocals
- Sister Bliss - keyboards, programming, sampling
- Rollo Armstrong - production, programming, sampling
- Dido - vocals, Track 6
- John Reid - outro vocals, Track 8
- LSK - vocals, Track 10

== Charts ==
Chart (2006)	Peak position
Austrian Albums (Ö3 Austria)	73
Belgian Albums (Ultratop Flanders)	12
Belgian Albums (Ultratop Wallonia)	27
Dutch Albums (Album Top 100)	29
German Albums (Offizielle Top 100)	70
Irish Albums (IRMA)	34
Scottish Albums (Official Charts)	28
Swiss Albums (Schweizer Hitparade)	11
UK Albums (Official Charts)	30
UK Dance Albums (Official Charts)	1

== Certifications ==
Region	Certification	Certified units/sales
Ireland (IRMA)	Gold	7,500^{^}
United Kingdom (BPI)	Gold	100,000^{^}
^{^} Shipments figures based on certification alone.
