= Don't Leave (Faithless song) =

1996 single by Faithless

- Original 1996 UK cover artwork

Single by Faithless

from the album Reverence and A Life Less Ordinary soundtrack
- B-side: "Salva Mea" (remix)
- Released: 11 March 1996
- Genre: Soul
- Length: 4:02
- Label: Cheeky
- Songwriters: Jamie Catto; Rollo; Sister Bliss
- Producers: Rollo; Sister Bliss

Faithless singles chronology
"Insomnia" (1995)	"Don't Leave" (1996)	"Insomnia" (1996)
"Reverence" (1997)	"Don't Leave" (1997)	"God Is a DJ" (1998)

Music video
- "Don't Leave" on YouTube

"Don't Leave" is a song by English band Faithless, co-written by Jamie Catto, Rollo, and Sister Bliss and produced by the latter two. Catto provides the lead vocals on the song while Pauline Taylor and Rollo's sister Dido perform several backing vocals. A downtempo soul ballad, the track was included on Faithless's debut album, Reverence (1996), and was released as its third single in March 1996, reaching number 34 on the UK Singles Chart.

In 1997, "Don't Leave" was included on the soundtrack of the romantic black comedy film A Life Less Ordinary. The song was re-released in a slightly remixed form to coincide with this appearance and reached a new peak of number 21 in the UK while also charting in Australia, the Netherlands, and New Zealand. In Australia, it was ranked number 95 on the Triple J Hottest 100 of 1997.

== Critical reception ==
Reviewing the 1997 re-release of the single, British publication Music Week named "Don't Leave" their "Single of the Week" on 25 October 1997, calling it a "sumptuous love theme" and praising its new dance remixes. The same year, British columnist James Masterton called "Don't Leave" one of the most "outstanding" tracks on Reverence, referring to it as "beautiful" and the "most proper" song on the album. Writing about the song in Music & Media magazine, Gary Smith noted that it would resound well with the then-upcoming Christmas season, calling it a "substantial" song with "slamming grooves". Retrospectively, Paul Clarke of the BBC wrote that the song is a "beautiful acoustic lament" in 2008 while Justin Chadwick of music website Albumism called the track "plaintive" in 2021.

== Chart performance ==
On the week starting 17 March 1996, "Don't Leave" debuted at number 34, its original peak, on the UK Singles Chart, giving Faithless their third top-40 hit. It dropped out of the top 100 two weeks later. In Germany, the song first charted at number 93 on 9 December 1996, rising to its peak of number 72 three weeks later, in January 1997. The same month, it debuted at number 49 on the Swiss Singles Chart. After peaking at number 38 the following week, the song spent the next four charts hovering between numbers 43 and 44 before dropping out of the top 100. In 1997, "Don't Leave" was re-released as a single from the soundtrack to A Life Less Ordinary, reaching a new peak of number 21 on the UK Singles Chart; it stayed in the top 100 for eight weeks in total. Throughout late 1997 and early 1998, the single charted in several other countries, peaking within the top 100 in Australia and the Netherlands and within the top 50 in New Zealand.

== Track listings ==
=== 1996 release ===
UK CD single

1. "Don't Leave" (radio edit)
2. "Don't Leave" (Floating mix)
3. "Don't Leave" (Big mix—mix 2)
4. "Don't Leave" (Moody mix—mix 1)

UK 12-inch single

A. "Don't Leave" (mix 1)
B. "Don't Leave" (mix 2)

UK cassette single

A. "Don't Leave" (radio edit)
AA. "Don't Leave" (Big mix)

German maxi-CD single

1. "Don't Leave" (radio edit) – 3:57
2. "Don't Leave" (live version) – 3:42
3. "Don't Leave" (Euphoric mix) – 11:24
4. "Don't Leave" (Deep mix) – 8:03
5. "Don't Leave" (Simple mix) – 8:12

German 12-inch single

A1. "Don't Leave" (Euphoric mix) – 11:24
A2. "Don't Leave" (Deep mix) – 8:03
B1. "Don't Leave" (Simple mix) – 8:12
B2. "Salva Mea" (Deep Gold mix) – 9:33

=== 1997 release ===
UK CD1

1. "Don't Leave" (Goetz's String mix)
2. "Don't Leave" (Hard mix)
3. "Don't Leave" (Nellee Hooper mix 1)
4. "Don't Leave" (Euphoric mix)
5. "Don't Leave" (Simple mix)

UK CD2

1. "Don't Leave" (String mix)
2. "Don't Leave" (Floating mix)
3. "Salva Mea" (Danny Tenaglia mix)

UK cassette single

1. "Don't Leave" (Hard mix)
2. "Don't Leave" (String mix)
3. "Don't Leave" (Floating mix)

Dutch CD single

1. "Don't Leave" (Euphoric radio)
2. "Don't Leave" (String mix)

French 12-inch single

A1. "Don't Leave" (Euphoric club mix)
A2. "Don't Leave" (String mix)
B1. "Don't Leave" (Simple mix)
B2. "Don't Leave" (Euphoric radio)

Australian CD and cassette single

1. "Don't Leave" (String version)
2. "Don't Leave" (Scratch edit)
3. "Don't Leave" (Ian Caple 7-inch Hard mix)
4. "Don't Leave" (Euphoric mix)

== Personnel ==
Personnel are lifted from the Reverence / Irreverence album booklet.

- Jamie Catto – writing, vocals
- Rollo – writing, programming, production
- Sister Bliss – writing, keyboards, production
- Pauline Taylor – additional lead and backing vocals
- Dido – backing vocals
- Dave Burnham – mixing, engineering
- Ibi Tijani – assistant engineering
- Nick Kirkland – assistant engineering

== Charts ==
Chart (1996–1998)	Peak position
Australia (ARIA)	73
Belgium (Ultratip Bubbling Under Flanders)	13
Germany (GfK)	72
Netherlands (Dutch Top 40 Tipparade)	5
Netherlands (Single Top 100)	76
New Zealand (Recorded Music NZ)	43
Scotland Singles (OCC)	36
Scotland Singles (OCC) 1997 re-release	19
Switzerland (Schweizer Hitparade)	38
UK Singles (OCC)	34
UK Singles (OCC) 1997 re-release	21
UK Dance (OCC)	4
UK Club Chart (Music Week)	18

== Release history ==
Region	Date	Format(s)	Label(s)	Ref.
United Kingdom	11 March 1996	12-inch vinyl; CD; cassette	Cheeky	
United States	28 July 1997	Modern rock radio	Arista	
United Kingdom (re-release)	3 November 1997	CD; cassette	Cheeky	
United States	13 January 1997	Contemporary hit radio	Arista	
