= I Will Not Let an Exam Result Decide My Fate =

- Video screenshot with Suli Breaks

Video by Suli Breaks
- Released: 14 April 2013
- Genre: Spoken word, Hip Hop
- Length: 5:53

"I Will Not Let an Exam Result Decide My Fate" is a 2013 video by English spoken word poet Suli Breaks.

== Overview ==
The video tells the story of a mother and son who have just been to a parents' evening at school. Suli Breaks chastises parents, teachers, and the government for focusing on exams instead of nurturing raw talent.

== Critical response ==
The Huffington Post said, "Throughout his act, Breaks explores the attitudes of today's society towards young people and exams."

== See also ==
- British hip hop
