= The Dance (Faithless album) =

Studio album by Faithless
- Released: 16 May 2010
- Genres: Trip hop; trance; dance
- Length: 65:49
- Labels: Nates Tunes; PIAS; Ultra

Faithless chronology
Insomnia: The Best of Faithless (2009)	The Dance (2010)	Faithless 2.0 (2015)

The Dance is the sixth studio album by dance music act Faithless on their own record label, Nates Tunes, and first for PIAS Recordings. Dido is featured on the songs "North Star" and "Feelin' Good". Actress and singer Mía Maestro performs the vocals on "Love Is My Condition".

The album was commercially successful and has sold over 600,000 units worldwide. In 2010 it was awarded a gold certification from the Independent Music Companies Association, which indicated sales of at least 100,000 copies throughout Europe.

== Background ==
The band's common theme for the album was a 'back to their roots' approach, with vocalist Maxi Jazz elaborating that the album was a return to the old, with an eye on the future; "This is probably the danciest album we’ve ever created; it's like a return to what we did before but more so." Sister Bliss added that the club culture was something the band members, especially her, were stuck with; "Late-night DJing will be the death of me but I'm good at it, goddammit. I've always found house music deeply absorbing; it forces you to be in the moment and it's locked into my DNA. I get riled when dance music gets undervalued as mindless nonsense because there's a galvanising force in people getting together to do something positive. There's nothing more joyous than people dancing and losing themselves to music."

"What's exciting is putting The Dance into context as our sixth album," adds Bliss. "After getting together to do one single, we never thought we’d reach this point. It's mad, innit? But it's also very rare that you find a unique voice and when Rollo and me first encountered Maxi, we didn't want the conversation to end. Our first record, Salva Mea, was very odd for 1990s dance music. The original is like a symphony that goes into hip hop then banging house – it's all over the bloody shop."

== Critical reception ==
Professional ratings
Review scores
Source	Rating
Digital Spy	3/5 stars
Evening Standard	3/5 stars
The Guardian	3/5 stars
MusicOMH	3/5 stars
Sputnikmusic	2.0/5

Critical reception has been mixed. Mike Diver of the BBC was generally critical of the release, but tended to question the band's commercial success rather than the music; "(Faithless have) released records to ever-quieter choruses of appreciation since their debut, 1996's Reverence. If they put out another collection of house-hued electro-pop but nobody's around to hear it, have they released anything at all?" However, Diver did note that "Crazy Bal'Heads dubs itself into a delightful spin, and Flyin Hi's gentle washes of sound are chill-out perfection. Dido's turn on Feelin Good is also a highlight, the vocalist sounding better than ever," but lamented a generally mediocre album; "too many token gestures ensure any lasting impression is extremely brief. Should they plan another long-player, Faithless would do well to return to their own source in search of the spark that first fired their career into life." Chris Flynn from The Vine.com.au was very critical of the album, saying that "The Dance is a complete anachronism. It's as if nothing has happened in music over the last 15 years, or at least nothing to which Faithless have paid any attention. The Dance feels like Reverence: The B-Sides."

Entertainment-Focus.com gave the album critical acclaim, stating that "Faithless are in top form here. Though the majority of the record is not quite as tight and epic as some of their earlier work they are still at the top of their game."

== Track listing ==
iTunes version
No.	Title	Length
1.	"Not Going Home"	6:40
2.	"Feel Me" (featuring Blancmange)	7:28
3.	"Crazy Bal'heads" (featuring Jonny "Itch" Fox of The King Blues)	3:27
4.	"Comin Around" (featuring Dougy Mandagi)	7:26
5.	"Tweak Your Nipple"	7:10
6.	"Flyin Hi"	7:13
7.	"Love Is My Condition" (featuring Mía Maestro)	5:22
8.	"Feelin Good" (featuring Dido)	7:08
9.	"North Star" (featuring Dido)	6:04
10.	"Sun to Me"	7:51

Tesco CD version / Tesco MP3 version (NATE1004CD)
No.	Title	Length
11.	"Scandalous"	4:59

Tesco deluxe edition CD version / Faithless web shop exclusive (NATE1004CDD)
No.	Title	Length
11.	"Happy"	4:08

iTunes deluxe version
No.	Title	Length
11.	"Not Going Home" (Seiji Speedy Remix)	5:29
12.	"Sun to Me" (MYNC Remix)	8:59
13.	"Happy"	4:07
14.	"A Minute With Maxi" (video)	1:46
15.	"Not Going Home" (video)	3:11
16.	"Digital Booklet – The Dance (Deluxe)"

The Dance Never Ends
No.	Title	Length
11.	"Not Going Home" (Eric Prydz Remix)	6:40
12.	"Feel Me" (ATFC's Spit Out the Sedative Remix)	6:17
13.	"Comin Around" (The Temper Trap Remix)	5:27
14.	"Tweak Your Nipple" (Crookers Remix)	3:55
15.	"Feelin Good" (Kyau & Albert Remix)	7:57
16.	"Sun to Me" (Mark Knight Co-Production)	7:40
17.	"Not Going Home" (Armin van Buuren Remix)	7:09
18.	"North Star" (Calida Remix)	3:30
19.	"Feel Me" (Penguin Prison Remix)	4:46
20.	"Tweak Your Nipple" (Tiësto Remix)	5:43

== Charts ==
=== Weekly charts ===
Chart (2010)	Peak position
Australian Albums (ARIA)	28
Austrian Albums (Ö3 Austria)	34
Belgian Albums (Ultratop Flanders)	1
Belgian Albums (Ultratop Wallonia)	1
Danish Albums (Hitlisten)	17
Dutch Albums (Album Top 100)	6
French Albums (SNEP)	133
German Albums (Offizielle Top 100)	10
Greek Albums (IFPI Greece)	2
Irish Albums (IRMA)	83
New Zealand Albums (RMNZ)	40
Norwegian Albums (VG-lista)	40
Polish Albums (OLiS)	20
Scottish Albums (Official Charts)	2
Swiss Albums (Schweizer Hitparade)	4
UK Albums (Official Charts)	2
UK Dance Albums (Official Charts)	1

=== Year-end charts ===
Chart (2010)	Position
Belgian Albums (Ultratop Flanders)	47
Belgian Albums (Ultratop Wallonia)	91
Dutch Albums (Album Top 100)	98
UK Albums (OCC)	128
