= One Step Too Far =

2002 single by Faithless featuring Dido

Single by Faithless featuring Dido

from the album Outrospective
- Released: 8 April 2002
- Studio: Swanyard (London, England)
- Length: 5:19 (album version); 3:24 (radio edit)
- Label: Cheeky; BMG
- Songwriters: Dido; Maxi Jazz; Sister Bliss; Rollo
- Producers: Rollo; Sister Bliss

Faithless singles chronology
"Crazy English Summer" / "Tarantula" (2001)	"One Step Too Far" (2002)	"Mass Destruction" (2004)

Dido singles chronology
"All You Want" (2001)	"One Step Too Far" (2002)	"Feels Like Fire" (2003)

"One Step Too Far" is a song by British electronic music group Faithless. The track features member Rollo Armstrong's sister Dido on vocals and was remixed for single release. "One Step Too Far" was released on 8 April 2002 as the fourth and final single from their third studio album, Outrospective (2001). The song peaked at number six on the UK Singles Chart, number four on the US Dance Club Play chart, and number 21 on the Australian Singles Chart.

== Track listings ==
UK CD single

1. "One Step Too Far" (radio edit) – 3:24
2. "One Step Too Far" (Rollo & Sister Bliss mix) – 7:43
3. "One Step Too Far" (Alex Neri Club Rah mix edit) – 8:48

UK 12-inch single

A. "One Step Too Far" (Rollo & Sister Bliss mix)
B. "One Step Too Far" (Alex Neri club vocal)

European CD single

1. "One Step Too Far" (radio edit) – 3:24
2. "One Step Too Far" (Alex Neri Club Rah mix edit) – 8:48

Australian maxi-CD single

1. "One Step Too Far" (radio edit) – 3:24
2. "One Step Too Far" (Rollo & Sister Bliss mix) – 7:43
3. "One Step Too Far" (Alex Neri Club Rah mix edit) – 8:48
4. "One Step Too Far" (Absolute Beginners mix) – 6:32

US maxi-CD single

1. "One Step Too Far" (radio edit) – 3:25
2. "One Step Too Far" (Rollo & Sister Bliss remix) – 7:43
3. "One Step Too Far" (Alex Neri Club Rah mix edit) – 8:48
4. "We Come 1" (album version) – 8:02
5. "One Step Too Far" (video)

US 12-inch single

A1. "One Step Too Far" (Absolute Beginners mix) – 6:31
A2. "One Step Too Far" (Rollo & Sister Bliss funky remix) – 6:46
B1. "One Step Too Far" (Alex Neri club vocal) – 9:22

== Credits and personnel ==
Credits are adapted from the Outrospective album booklet.

Studios

- Recorded at Swanyard Studios (London, England)
- Mixed at the Ark
- Mastered at Metropolis Mastering (London, England)

Personnel

- Dido – writing, vocals
- Maxi Jazz – writing, rap
- Sister Bliss – writing, keyboards, production
- Rollo – writing, production, programming
- Grippa – engineering, sonic enhancement
- Peanut – engineering and sonic enhancement assistant
- Miles Showell – mastering

== Charts ==
Chart (2002)	Peak position
Australia (ARIA)	21
Belgium (Ultratip Bubbling Under Flanders)	6
Belgium (Ultratip Bubbling Under Wallonia)	4
Europe (Eurochart Hot 100)	35
Germany (GfK)	48
Greece (IFPI)	16
Hungary (Rádiós Top 40)	17
Hungary (Single Top 40)	4
Ireland (IRMA)	8
Ireland Dance (IRMA)	1
Italy (FIMI)	13
Netherlands (Dutch Top 40)	37
Netherlands (Single Top 100)	47
Romania (Romanian Top 100)	17
Scottish Singles Sales (Official Charts)	11
Switzerland (Schweizer Hitparade)	51
UK Singles (Official Charts)	6
UK Dance (Official Charts)	4
US Dance Club Songs (Billboard)	4
US Dance Singles Sales (Billboard)	14

== Release history ==
Region	Date	Format(s)	Label(s)	Ref.
United Kingdom	8 April 2002	12-inch vinyl; CD	Cheeky; BMG	
Denmark	15 April 2002	CD	Cheeky; BMG	
Sweden	15 April 2002	CD	Cheeky; BMG	
Australia	29 April 2002	CD	Cheeky; BMG	
