= Why I Hate School but Love Education =

Video by Suli Breaks
- Released: 2 December 2012
- Genre: Spoken word, Hip Hop
- Length: 6:07

"Why I Hate School but Love Education" is a 2012 video by English spoken word poet Suli Breaks.

== Overview ==
The video conveys the message that, while education is good, educational institutions leave much to be desired. It features Suli Breaks rhyming his dislike of the unnecessary strictures of formal schooling. In the video, Breaks also outlines why young people are encouraged to get a formal education.

== Critical response ==
Emi Kolawole of The Washington Post said, "Breaks's message taps into a very fundamental desire among young people to disrupt — that word ubiquitous to innovation — the educational system." Steven Kalas of the Las Vegas Review-Journal said, "Breaks's motif is rhythmic, staccato narrative. But it's absent the percussive, droning cacophony accompanying most of rap or hip-hop."

== See also ==
- British hip hop
