= Suli Breaks =

- Born: Darryll Suliaman Amoako; 22 January 1988 (age 38); Wood Green, Haringey, London, England
- Origin: London, England
- Genres: Spoken word; hip hop
- Occupation: Poet
- Years active: 2009–present
- Website: sulibreaks.com

Darryll Suliaman Amoako (born 22 January 1988), better known by his stage name Suli Breaks, is an English spoken word poet. He is best known for his spoken word videos on his YouTube Channel, Suli Breaks, his 2012 video "Why I Hate School but Love Education" and his 2013 video "I Will Not Let an Exam Result Decide My Fate".

== Early life ==
Amoako was born in Wood Green, London, England. He grew up as one of three children to Ghanaian parents in what he describes as "a conventional African family, where education is paramount". He has two sisters, Anisah (younger) and Cherelle (older).

He went to Enfield Grammar School for a year before accepting a scholarship to play basketball in Middlesbrough. In 2009, he graduated with a degree in Law from the University of Sheffield.

== Career ==
Amoako's basketball coach's brother, Ben Peters, came up with the name "Suli Breaks", which derived from his forename of Suliaman and the concept of "breaking someone's ankles".

Amoako has been writing poetry most of his life but first performed it on stage in 2008. He first started spoken word poetry when he was at his last year of university. Even in his last year he found he was not engaged in what he was studying and was distant from it. He found the spoken word is what he enjoyed doing so decided to pursue that. He has been featured in The Voice, was winner of Aspire Talent 2008 and was also a finalist in the 2009 Uni's Got Talent Competition. He was awarded second place in the Mastermind Talks. Breaks featured on the track "Glass" on Kasabian's 2014 album 48:13.

In July 2014, Amoako spoke on TEDx event at the House of Parliament. In February 2015, Amoako partnered with The National Citizen Service (NCS) to encourage the nation's teens to '#SayYes' or "Say, 'Yes!' to NCS", a digital campaign targeting 15- to 17-year-olds across England and Northern Ireland reflects on the importance of embracing the opportunities life has to offer. He also appeared on a campaign video for David Lammy to become Mayor of London. In early 2015, with a £20,000 budget, he created a round the world in 80 days vlogumentary.

Amoako's YouTube channel has over 8.9 million views and over 320,000 subscribers.

In September and November 2014, Amoako featured in two episodes of comedy web series Corner Shop Show.

In 2017, Suli Breaks was featured on African Rapper Sarkodie's "Highest" Album on the track called Silence.

=== Faithless collaboration ===
On 16 July 2020, Suli Breaks appeared on the second Faithless dance single of 2020, "This Feeling". Suli appears with singer/songwriter Nathan Ball. He featured on the band's 2020 studio album All Blessed, their 2024 single "Find a Way", and 2025's track "Peace and Noise".

== Personal life ==
Amoako is a Muslim and is married. He has said he looks to numerous of sources of inspiration. He admires; Steve Jobs for innovation, Michael Jordan for his hard work and intensity, and Nelson Mandela and Malcolm X as figures committed to their beliefs.

== See also ==
- British hip hop
- List of performance poets
