= God Is a DJ (Faithless song) =

1998 single by Faithless

- UK and European cover

Single by Faithless

from the album Sunday 8PM
- Released: 24 August 1998
- Genre: Trance
- Length: 8:01
- Label: Cheeky; Arista
- Songwriters: Rollo Armstrong; Maxwell Fraser; Ayalah Deborah Bentovim; Jamie Catto
- Producers: Rollo; Sister Bliss

Faithless singles chronology
"Don't Leave" (1997)	"God Is a DJ" (1998)	"Take the Long Way Home" (1998)

Alternative cover
- 12-inch cover

Audio sample
- "God Is a DJ" excerpt: file; help

Music video
- "God Is a DJ" on YouTube

"God Is a DJ" is a song by British group Faithless, written by Maxi Jazz, Rollo, Sister Bliss, and Jamie Catto. It was released on 24 August 1998 as the lead single from their second studio album, Sunday 8PM (1998). The single reached number six in the United Kingdom and also reached number one on the US Billboard Hot Dance Club Play chart in September 1998. The title and core lyric originated from words on a T-shirt worn to rehearsal by the band guitarist Dave Randall.

Faithless won a Brit Award for Best British Act in 1999 for their work on the song and other tracks on Sunday 8PM. Billboard claimed in an article in early 1999 that many people involved with dance music thought that "God Is a DJ" should have been nominated for a Grammy Award for Best Recording of 1998. The song re-entered the UK chart in 2005 following the release of Forever Faithless and reached number 66. After Maxi Jazz died in December 2022, the song charted at number 40 on the UK Singles Downloads Chart.

== Critical reception ==
Larry Flick from Billboard wrote that Faithless are "melding electronic elements into a trance-disco beat." He noted further that vocalist Maxi Jazz "strides atop the track with a hypnotic chant that boldly declares the club a church. As he rants "this is my church," organ lines swoop and surround him as the beat pumps with intense authority." Daily Record described it as a "pumping, hypnotic track".

== Track listings ==
UK CD release

1. "God Is a DJ" (radio edit) – 03:34
2. "God Is a DJ" (Monster mix) [edit] – 06:52
3. "God Is a DJ" (Serious Danger remix) [edit] – 05:09
4. "God Is a DJ" (Sharp remix) [edit] – 04:27

European CD release

1. "God Is a DJ" (radio edit) – 03:33
2. "God Is a DJ" (Monster mix) [edit] – 06:53
3. "God Is a DJ" (Serious Danger remix) [edit] – 05:09
4. "God Is a DJ" (Sharp remix) [edit] – 04:26

French CD release

1. "God Is a DJ" (radio mix) – 03:32
2. "God Is a DJ" (Sharp remix) – 04:26

Greek CD release

1. "God Is a DJ" (radio edit) – 03:33
2. "God Is a DJ" (Monster mix) – 06:53
3. "God Is a DJ" (Serious Danger remix) – 05:09
4. "God Is a DJ" (Sharp remix) – 04:26

12-inch release

1. "God Is a DJ" (Monster mix) – 08:01
2. "God Is a DJ" (Sharp remix) – 09:21

== Charts ==
=== Weekly charts ===
Chart (1998)	Peak position
Australia (ARIA)	37
Austria (Ö3 Austria Top 40)	9
Belgium (Ultratop 50 Flanders)	4
Belgium (Ultratop 50 Wallonia)	5
Canada Dance/Urban (RPM)	1
Denmark (IFPI)	4
Europe (Eurochart Hot 100)	4
Finland (Suomen virallinen lista)	6
France (SNEP)	43
Germany (GfK)	2
Greece (IFPI)	6
Hungary (Mahasz)	10
Ireland (IRMA)	11
Italy (Musica e dischi)	17
Netherlands (Dutch Top 40)	1
Netherlands (Single Top 100)	3
New Zealand (Recorded Music NZ)	10
Norway (VG-lista)	4
Scottish Singles Sales (Official Charts)	6
Spain (AFYVE)	6
Sweden (Sverigetopplistan)	20
Switzerland (Schweizer Hitparade)	2
UK Singles (Official Charts)	6
UK Dance (Official Charts)	4
US Dance Club Songs (Billboard)	1
US Dance Singles Sales (Billboard)	44

Chart (2022)	Peak position
UK Singles Downloads (Official Charts)	40

=== Year-end charts ===
Chart (1998)	Position
Belgium (Ultratop 50 Flanders)	31
Belgium (Ultratop 50 Wallonia)	45
Canada Dance (RPM)	4
Europe (Eurochart Hot 100)	33
Germany (Media Control)	31
Netherlands (Dutch Top 40)	34
Netherlands (Single Top 100)	35
Sweden (Hitlistan)	92
Switzerland (Schweizer Hitparade)	27
US Dance Club Play (Billboard)	16

== Certifications ==
Region	Certification	Certified units/sales
Belgium (BRMA)	Gold	25,000^{*}
Germany (BVMI)	Gold	250,000^{^}
Norway (IFPI Norway)	Gold	
United Kingdom (BPI)	Platinum	600,000^{‡}
^{*} Sales figures based on certification alone.^{^} Shipments figures based on certification alone.^{‡} Sales+streaming figures based on certification alone.

== Release history ==
Region	Date	Format(s)	Label(s)	Ref.
United States	18 August 1998	Rhythmic contemporary radio	Arista; Cheeky	
United Kingdom	24 August 1998	12-inch; CD; cassette	Cheeky	

== See also ==
- List of number-one dance singles of 1998 (U.S.)
