= Outrospective =

2001 studio album by Faithless

Studio album by Faithless
- Released: 18 June 2001
- Genres: Trip hop; trance
- Length: 57:58
- Label: Cheeky/BMG
- Producer: Rollo

Faithless chronology
Sunday 8PM (1998)	Outrospective (2001)	The Bedroom Sessions (2001)

Professional ratings
Review scores
Source	Rating
AllMusic	1.5/5 stars
Alternative Press	8/10
Entertainment.ie	4/5 stars
The Guardian	4/5 stars
Mixmag	4/5 stars
NME	4/10
Q	3/5 stars
Under the Radar	6/10

Outrospective is the third album by Faithless, released on 18 June 2001. It is the follow-up to Sunday 8PM and the predecessor to No Roots. The single "We Come 1" had the most success, charting at number 3 on the UK Singles Chart, while "One Step Too Far" with vocals from Dido charted at number 6, and both "Muhammad Ali" and "Tarantula" charted at number 29. The album itself reached number 6 on the UK Albums Chart. The cover photograph was taken during the May 1968 students uprisings in Paris, France. In the cover booklet of Forever Faithless – The Greatest Hits, Rollo Armstrong has stated that despite Outrospective being their biggest selling album in the UK, it is, however, his least favourite.

== Track listing ==
No.	Title	Length
1.	"Donny X"	4:08
2.	"Not Enuff Love" (featuring Steve Rowland)	5:55
3.	"We Come 1"	8:14
4.	"Crazy English Summer" (featuring Zoë Johnston)	2:48
5.	"Muhammad Ali" (featuring Pauline Taylor)	4:21
6.	"Machines R Us"	3:44
7.	"One Step Too Far" (featuring Dido)	5:22
8.	"Tarantula"	6:42
9.	"Giving Myself Away"	4:38
10.	"Code"	1:40
11.	"Evergreen" (featuring Zoë Johnston)	4:35
12.	"Liontamer" (featuring Zoë Johnston)	5:50

== Outrospective / Reperspective ==
Outrospective / Reperspective

Remix album by Faithless
- Released: 27 August 2002
- Genres: Trip hop; dance
- Length: CD1: 58:00; CD2: 65:59
- Label: Cheeky/BMG
- Producer: Rollo

Faithless chronology
The Bedroom Sessions (2001)	Outrospective / Reperspective (2002)	No Roots (2004)

Outrospective / Reperspective is a re-release of the Outrospective album from Faithless. The CD contains a bonus CD with remixes. The album won the Dancestar Award for Album of the Year in 2002.

No.	Title	Length
1.	"One Step Too Far (Radio Edit)" (featuring Dido)	3:23
2.	"We Come 1 (Wookie Remix)" (featuring Steve Rowland)	3:24
3.	"Lotus"	7:04
4.	"Crazy English Summer (Brothers on High Remix)" (featuring Zoë Johnston)	7:07
5.	"Giving Myself Away (P*Nut Remix)"	3:56
6.	"Evergreen (Dusted Remix)" (featuring Zoë Johnston)	5:33
7.	"Not Enuff Love (Skinny Remix)" (featuring Steve Rowland)	4:49
8.	"Daimoku"	4:11
9.	"Liontamer (Ernest St. Laurent Remix)" (featuring Zoë Johnston)	6:16
10.	"We Come 1 (Dave Clarke Remix)"	6:07
11.	"God Is a Beckham (BBC World Cup Theme)"	5:27
12.	"Crazy English Summer (Hiver & Hammer Remix)" (featuring Zoë Johnston)	8:36

== Charts ==
=== Weekly charts ===
Chart (2001)	Peak position
Australian Albums (ARIA)	11
Austrian Albums (Ö3 Austria)	17
Belgian Albums (Ultratop Flanders)	1
Belgian Albums (Ultratop Wallonia)	8
Danish Albums (Hitlisten)	11
Dutch Albums (Album Top 100)	2
Finnish Albums (Suomen virallinen lista)	10
French Albums (SNEP)	100
German Albums (Offizielle Top 100)	3
Hungarian Albums (MAHASZ)	5
Irish Albums (IRMA)	5
Italian Albums (FIMI)	35
New Zealand Albums (RMNZ)	26
Norwegian Albums (VG-lista)	2
Scottish Albums (Official Charts)	4
Swedish Albums (Sverigetopplistan)	19
Swiss Albums (Schweizer Hitparade)	4
UK Albums (Official Charts)	4
US Top Dance Albums (Billboard)	9

=== Year-end charts ===
Chart (2001)	Position
Belgian Albums (Ultratop Flanders)	20
Dutch Albums (Album Top 100)	36
German Albums (Offizielle Top 100)	55
Swiss Albums (Schweizer Hitparade)	77
UK Albums (OCC)	87

Chart (2002)	Position
Belgian Albums (Ultratop Flanders)	61

== Certifications and sales ==
Region	Certification	Certified units/sales
Belgium (BRMA)	Gold	25,000^{*}
Netherlands (NVPI)	Gold	40,000^{^}
Norway (IFPI Norway)	Gold	25,000^{*}
Switzerland (IFPI Switzerland)	Gold	20,000^{^}
United Kingdom (BPI)	Platinum	300,000^{*}
Summaries
Worldwide	—	700,000
^{*} Sales figures based on certification alone.^{^} Shipments figures based on certification alone.
