= Dusted (British band) =

British recording duo

Dusted is the joint venture of two record producers, Rollo Armstrong (of Faithless, and brother of the singer Dido) and Mark Bates (Guy Ornadel). Their best-remembered track is "Always Remember to Respect and Honour Your Mother Part One" (Go! Beat/Polydor) in 2001, which reached No. 31 on the UK Singles Chart. The song featured vocals from 12-year-old schoolboy Alan Young.

In July 2009, Bates announced on Myspace that the second part of the project would be named All Thieves and feature vocals from Kristian Leontiou and Bailey Tzuke. The CD release was titled We Are All Thieves. All Thieves' tracks "Turn and Turn Again" and "We Will Be Dust" were featured in Grey's Anatomy in 2009.

== Discography ==
=== Albums ===
- When We Were Young (2000)
- Safe from Harm (2005)

=== Appearances ===
- "Deeper River," a song on the A Life Less Ordinary Soundtrack (1997)

== See also ==
- The Dusted Variations
- Faithless
