= No Roots (album) =

Studio album by Faithless
- Released: 7 June 2004
- Genres: Trip hop; trance; alternative rock
- Length: 53:53
- Label: Cheeky/BMG
- Producer: Faithless

Faithless chronology
| Outrospective / Reperspective (2002) | No Roots (2004) | Everything Will Be Alright Tomorrow (2004) |

Professional ratings
Review scores
| Source | Rating |
|---|---|
| AllMusic | 3.5/5 stars |
| DIY | 4/5 stars |
| The Guardian | 2/5 stars |
| The Independent | 2/5 stars |
| Release Magazine | 8/10 |
| Rolling Stone | 3.5/5 stars |

No Roots is the fourth album by British electronic music act Faithless, released in 2004. It reached number one on the UK Albums Chart that year, giving them their first number one album in their career. It features vocals from vocalist Dido, LSK (musician), and the late Nina Simone.

== Track listing ==
| No. | Title | Length |
|---|---|---|
| 1. | "Intro" (featuring Dido and LSK) | 0:27 |
| 2. | "Mass Destruction" | 3:44 |
| 3. | "I Want More: Part 1" (featuring LSK) | 2:49 |
| 4. | "I Want More: Part 2" (featuring Nina Simone) | 3:11 |
| 5. | "Love Lives on My Street" (featuring LSK) | 2:10 |
| 6. | "Bluegrass" (featuring LSK) | 2:45 |
| 7. | "Sweep" | 4:03 |
| 8. | "Miss U Less, See U More" (featuring Pauline Taylor and LSK) | 3:41 |
| 9. | "No Roots" (featuring Dido and LSK) | 5:24 |
| 10. | "Swingers" | 3:48 |
| 11. | "Pastoral" | 4:27 |
| 12. | "Everything Will Be Alright Tomorrow" (featuring LSK) | 2:19 |
| 13. | "What About Love" | 6:58 |
| 14. | "In the End" (featuring LSK) | 4:12 |
| 15. | "Mass Destruction" (P*Nut and Sister Bliss Mix) | 3:31 |

2006 re-release bonus tracks
| No. | Title | Length |
|---|---|---|
| 16. | "Blissy's Groove" | 9:26 |
| 17. | "Miss U Less, See U More" (Switch's Chops) | 6:10 |
| 18. | "I Want More" (Beginerz Remix) | 7:52 |

== History ==
The song "No Roots" was featured on the track list of FIFA 2005 released by EA Sports.

== Charts ==
=== Weekly charts ===
| Chart (2004) | Peak position |
|---|---|
| Australian Albums (ARIA) | 23 |
| Austrian Albums (Ö3 Austria) | 26 |
| Belgian Albums (Ultratop Flanders) | 1 |
| Belgian Albums (Ultratop Wallonia) | 13 |
| Danish Albums (Hitlisten) | 37 |
| Dutch Albums (Album Top 100) | 3 |
| Finnish Albums (Suomen virallinen lista) | 23 |
| French Albums (SNEP) | 186 |
| German Albums (Offizielle Top 100) | 12 |
| Hungarian Albums (MAHASZ) | 22 |
| Irish Albums (IRMA) | 18 |
| Italian Albums (FIMI) | 37 |
| Norwegian Albums (VG-lista) | 17 |
| Scottish Albums (Official Charts) | 2 |
| Swiss Albums (Schweizer Hitparade) | 10 |
| UK Albums (Official Charts) | 1 |
| US Top Dance Albums (Billboard) | 4 |

=== Year-end charts ===
| Chart (2004) | Position |
|---|---|
| Belgian Albums (Ultratop Flanders) | 24 |
| Dutch Albums (Album Top 100) | 63 |
| UK Albums (OCC) | 101 |

== Certifications ==
| Region | Certification | Certified units/sales |
|---|---|---|
| Russia (NFPF) | Gold | 10,000^{*} |
| United Kingdom (BPI) | Gold | 100,000^{^} |
^{*} Sales figures based on certification alone.^{^} Shipments figures based on certification alone.
