= Caleb Femi =

Nigerian author, photographer and filmmaker (born 1990)

- Born: 1990 (age 35–36); Kano, Nigeria
- Occupations: Author; Filmmaker; Photographer
- Notable work: Poor (2020)
- Awards: Felix Dennis Prize for Best First Collection
- Website: www.calebfemi.com

Caleb Femi (born 1990) is a Nigerian-British author, film director, photographer, poet, and former Young People's Laureate for London. His debut poetry collection, Poor, was awarded a Forward Prize for Poetry.

== Early life ==
Caleb Femi was born in 1990 in Kano, Nigeria, where he was brought up by his grandmother. When he was seven years old, he moved to join his parents on the North Peckham Estate in London. After leaving school, he studied English at Queen Mary, University of London.

== Career ==
From 2014 to 2016, Femi taught English at a secondary school in Tottenham. In 2015, Femi won the Roundhouse Poetry Slam. He was the first Young People’s Laureate for London 2016-2018. On 30 July 2020, he published his debut poetry collection, entitled Poor, which won the Forward Prize's Felix Dennis Prize for Best First Collection in October 2021. Poor was longlisted for the 2021 Jhalak Prize and shortlisted for the shortlisted for the Rathbones Folio Prize. Femi contributed an essay to Of This Our Country: Acclaimed Nigerian Writers on the Home, Identity and Culture They Know' published by HarperCollins Publishers in September 2022. In September 2024 Caleb Femi's second poetry collection, The Wickedest, was published by HarperCollins Publishers. Femi was a judge for the International Booker Prize 2025.

== Filmography ==
Femi has so far made and released five short films, serving as writer/director on each:

- And They Knew Light (2017)
- Wishbone (2018)
- Secret Life of Gs (2019)
- Survivor's Guilt (2020)
- Giraffe (2023)

== Accolades ==
Femi was named in Dazed magazine's 2021 Dazed100, a list of the next generation shaping youth culture. The Wickedest was named as one of the best poetry books of 2024 by The Guardian.
