= Reverence (Faithless album) =

1996 album by Faithless

Studio album by Faithless
- Released: 15 April 1996
- Recorded: 1995
- Studio: Swanyard Studios (London)
- Genres: Progressive house; trip hop; downtempo
- Length: 52:50
- Labels: Cheeky; BMG
- Producer: Rollo

Faithless chronology
Reverence (1996)	Sunday 8PM (1998)

Singles from Reverence
- 1. "Salva Mea" Released: 24 July 1995; 2. "Insomnia" Released: 27 November 1995; 3. "Don't Leave" Released: 11 March 1996; 4. "If Lovin' You is Wrong" Released: 8 July 1996; 5. "Reverence" Released: 14 April 1997

Professional ratings
Review scores
Source	Rating
AllMusic	4/5 stars
Artistdirect	4/5 stars
Music Week	3/5 stars
Muzik	5/5 stars
Q	4/5 stars

Reverence is the debut album by English electronic music group Faithless, released in April 1996 and then reissued in October. The album contains several singles that have subsequently become Faithless classics, such as "Don't Leave", "Salva Mea", and "Insomnia". The album reached number 26 on the UK Albums Chart.

In November 1996, the album was re-released as Reverence / Irreverence containing an extra CD with remixes of the original songs.

== Track listing ==
All songs written by Rollo Armstrong, Sister Bliss and Maxi Jazz, except where noted.

No.	Title	Writer(s)	Length
1.	"Reverence"		7:43
2.	"Don't Leave"	Armstrong, Bliss, Jamie Catto	4:02
3.	"Salva Mea"		10:47
4.	"If Lovin' You is Wrong"		4:17
5.	"Angeline"	Armstrong, Bliss, Catto	3:37
6.	"Insomnia"		8:47
7.	"Dirty Ol' Man"		3:05
8.	"Flowerstand Man"	Armstrong, Dido Armstrong	3:22
9.	"Baseball Cap"		2:56
10.	"Drifting Away"	Armstrong, Bliss	4:09

== Reverence / Irreverence ==
Reverence / Irreverence

Remix album by Faithless
- Released: 11 November 1996
- Genres: Trip hop, dance
- Length: CD1: 52:50; CD2: 47:53
- Labels: Cheeky; BMG
- Producer: Rollo

Faithless chronology
Reverence (1996)	Reverence / Irreverence (1996)	Sunday 8PM (1998)

Reverence / Irreverence is a re-release of Reverence album, featuring a bonus CD with remixes.

Irreverence
No.	Title	Length
1.	"Flowerstand Man (Matt Benbrook Remix)" (featuring Dido)	3:58
2.	"Angeline (The Innocents Mix)"	1:47
3.	"Reverence (DJ Tamsin Re-fix)"	5:18
4.	"Soundcheck Jam"	3:00
5.	"Salva Mea (Way Out West Remix)"	7:46
6.	"Don't Leave (Floating Remix by Rollo & Sister Bliss)" (featuring Pauline Taylor)	5:53
7.	"Drifting Away (Paradiso Mix by Angelo D'Caruso)" (featuring Penny Shaw)	6:46
8.	"Insomnia (Moody Mix by Rollo & Sister Bliss)"	10:40
9.	"Baseball Dub (Cheeky All Stars Remix by Goetz, Matt Benbrook, Rollo & Sister Bliss)"	2:40

== Charts ==
Chart (1996–1997)	Peak position
Australian Albums (ARIA)	51
Austrian Albums (Ö3 Austria)	26
Belgian Albums (Ultratop Flanders)	47
Belgian Albums (Ultratop Wallonia)	37
Dutch Albums (Album Top 100)	45
Finnish Albums (Suomen virallinen lista)	13
German Albums (Offizielle Top 100)	17
Hungarian Albums (MAHASZ)	13
New Zealand Albums (RMNZ)	17
Norwegian Albums (VG-lista)	7
Swiss Albums (Schweizer Hitparade)	18
UK Albums (Official Charts)	26

== Certifications ==
Region	Certification	Certified units/sales
Germany (BVMI)	Gold	250,000^{^}
Netherlands (NVPI)	Gold	50,000^{^}
Norway (IFPI Norway)	Gold	25,000^{*}
Switzerland (IFPI Switzerland)	Gold	25,000^{^}
United Kingdom (BPI)	Platinum	300,000^{*}
^{*} Sales figures based on certification alone.^{^} Shipments figures based on certification alone.
