= We Come 1 =

2001 single by Faithless

- UK CD1 cover

Single by Faithless

from the album Outrospective
- Released: 4 June 2001
- Studio: Swanyard (London, England)
- Length: 3:43 (radio edit)
- Label: Cheeky; BMG
- Songwriters: Maxi Jazz; Sister Bliss; Rollo
- Producers: Sister Bliss; Rollo

Faithless singles chronology
"Why Go?" (1999)	"We Come 1" (2001)	"Muhammad Ali" (2001)

Music video
- "We Come 1" on YouTube

Alternative cover
- UK CD2 and international cover

"We Come 1" is a song by British electronic band Faithless from their third studio album, Outrospective (2001). The song was issued as the album's lead single on 4 June 2001, two weeks before Outrospective was released. The remixes by Wookie and Dave Clarke that appear on the single releases are included on the bonus disc of the album Reperspective: The Remixes.

"We Come 1" reached number three in the United Kingdom, making it the joint-highest-charting Faithless song on the UK Singles Chart along with the 1996 re-release of "Insomnia". The single also reached the top three in Denmark, Greece, Hungary, the Netherlands, Norway, and Romania. A music video directed by Dom and Nic was created for the track. The song re-charted at number 70 on the UK Singles Downloads Chart after the death of Maxi Jazz in December 2022.

== Critical reception ==
Miriam Hubner of Music & Media called "We Come 1" a "fervent love song" and called its production "smooth". Andy Hermann of online magazine PopMatters wrote that the song is an "obvious attempt to follow up the international club success of 'God Is a DJ'", praising its riff and production but noting that it "hardly rocks your world". Reviewing the album on AllMusic, Dean Carlson labelled the track a "sagging comeback single", comparing it to a mundane version of the Underworld song "Oich Oich" (1996).

== Track listings ==
UK CD1

1. "We Come 1" (radio edit) – 3:44
2. "We Come 1" (Rollo & Sister Bliss remix) – 8:06
3. "We Come 1" (Dave Clarke remix) – 5:22

UK CD2

1. "We Come 1" (radio edit) – 3:46
2. "We Come 1" (Wookie remix) – 5:53
3. "We Come 1" (Rocket vs Jeno remix) – 7:55

European CD single

1. "We Come 1" (radio edit) – 3:43
2. "We Come 1" (Rollo & Sister Bliss remix) – 8:32

UK 12-inch single

1. "We Come 1" (Rollo & Sister Bliss remix) – 8:32
2. "We Come 1" (Eliot J remix) – 6:52

European maxi-CD single and Australian CD single

1. "We Come 1" (radio mix) – 3:43
2. "We Come 1" (Rollo & Sister Bliss mix) – 8:32
3. "We Come 1" (Dave Clarke mix) – 6:04
4. "We Come 1" (Wookie remix) – 5:50
5. "We Come 1" (Rocket vs Jeno remix) – 7:55

== Credits and personnel ==
Credits are adapted from the UK CD1 liner notes and the Outrospective booklet.

Studios

- Recorded at Swanyard Studios (London, England)
- Mixed at the Ark
- Mastered at the Exchange (London, England)

Personnel

- Maxi Jazz – writing, rap writing and performance
- Sister Bliss – writing, keyboards, production
- Rollo – writing, production, programming
- Andy Treacey – live drums
- Grippa – engineering, sonic enhancement
- Peanut – engineering and sonic enhancement assistance
- Guy Davie – mastering
- Simon Corkin – artwork design
- Ellis Parrinder – photography

== Charts ==
=== Weekly charts ===
Chart (2001)	Peak position
Australia (ARIA)	62
Austria (Ö3 Austria Top 40)	29
Belgium (Ultratop 50 Flanders)	9
Belgium (Ultratop 50 Wallonia)	11
Denmark (Tracklisten)	3
Europe (Eurochart Hot 100)	5
Finland (Suomen virallinen lista)	4
Germany (GfK)	17
Greece (IFPI)	2
Hungary (Mahasz)	2
Ireland (IRMA)	6
Ireland Dance (IRMA)	1
Netherlands (Dutch Top 40)	2
Netherlands (Single Top 100)	3
Norway (VG-lista)	3
Portugal (AFP)	8
Romania (Romanian Top 100)	3
Scottish Singles Sales (Official Charts)	3
Spain (Promusicae)	13
Sweden (Sverigetopplistan)	18
Switzerland (Schweizer Hitparade)	16
UK Singles (Official Charts)	3
UK Dance (Official Charts)	3
US Dance Club Songs (Billboard)	3

Chart (2022)	Peak position
UK Singles Downloads (Official Charts)	70

=== Year-end charts ===
Chart (2001)	Position
Belgium (Ultratop 50 Flanders)	44
Belgium (Ultratop 50 Wallonia)	54
Ireland (IRMA)	55
Netherlands (Dutch Top 40)	16
Netherlands (Single Top 100)	57
Romania (Romanian Top 100)	29
UK Singles (OCC)	90
US Dance Club Play (Billboard)	26

== Certifications ==
Region	Certification	Certified units/sales
Belgium (BRMA)	Gold	25,000^{*}
Denmark (IFPI Danmark)	Gold	4,000^{^}
Norway (IFPI Norway)	Gold	
United Kingdom (BPI)	Gold	400,000^{‡}
^{*} Sales figures based on certification alone.^{^} Shipments figures based on certification alone.^{‡} Sales+streaming figures based on certification alone.

== Release history ==
Region	Date	Format(s)	Label(s)	Ref(s).
Australia	4 June 2001	CD	Cheeky; BMG	
United Kingdom	4 June 2001	12-inch vinyl; CD	Cheeky; BMG	
Sweden	5 June 2001	CD	Cheeky; BMG	
