= LSK (musician) =

British record producer and songwriter (born 1971)

- Born: Leigh Stephen Kenny; 26 July 1971 (age 55)
- Genres: Hip hop, reggae, dance
- Years active: 1997–present
- Labels: Sony Music UK; Dreadzone

Leigh Stephen Kenny (born 26 July 1971), known professionally as LSK, is a British singer, songwriter and record producer based in Leeds, who uses a mix of reggae and hip hop. He originated a style that has been compared to the Streets, which is mentioned in a song on his second album, Outlaw. He has collaborated and toured with the dance act Faithless since 2004.

== Music career ==
Prior to his solo career, Kenny was the frontman of the group Bedlam Ago Go, which was signed to Sony Soho Square and released one album, Estate Style Entertainment, in 1997.

His debut solo album was the self-titled LSK but also known as Mozaik, was released in September 2000. The follow-up, Outlaw, followed in February 2003, and remains his latest solo album to date.

LSK first collaborated with Faithless on their UK Number 1, 2004 album No Roots, and has continued as a touring and recording musician with the group. He has toured and recorded with the band since that time.

During the mid-2010s, he was part of Maxi Jazz's side project Maxi Jazz & the E-Type Boys, which released a studio album in 2016.

In 2024, LSK collaborated Faithless on "I'm Not Alone (Rest Well Maxwell)", a tribute to their late founding vocalist Maxi Jazz. LSK features on the 2025 Faithless studio album Champion Sound, including the track "In Your Own Groove".

== Non-music ==
Kenny is the older brother of English R&B artist Rhianna. His 2000 song "Hate or Love" featured a duet between the two.

LSK is also an artist and has designed for various clients including Faithless and Nightmares on Wax.

== Discography ==
=== Albums ===
Solo

- LSK (2000)
- Outlaw (2003)

with Faithless

- No Roots (2004)
- To All New Arrivals (2007)
- The Dance (2010)
- All Blessed (2020)
- Champion Sound (2025)

with Maxi Jazz & the E-Type Boys

- Simple, Not Easy (2016)

=== Solo singles ===
- "Hate or Love" (April 2000)
- "Roots (The Fruit of Many)" (August 2000)
- "The Biggest Fool" (November 2000)
- "Rap Starr" (June 2003)
