= Sunday 8PM =

Studio album by Faithless
- Released: 28 September 1998
- Recorded: 1998
- Studio: Swanyard Studios (London)
- Genres: Electronic, trip hop, trance, downtempo
- Length: 57:30
- Label: Cheeky/BMG
- Producer: Rollo

Faithless chronology
| Reverence (1996) | Sunday 8PM (1998) | Outrospective (2001) |

Professional ratings
Review scores
| Source | Rating |
|---|---|
| AllMusic | 3/5 stars |
| The Independent | 3/5 stars |
| NME | 8/10 |
| Pitchfork | 4.4/10 |
| Q | 3/5 stars |
| Rolling Stone | 2.5/5 stars |

Sunday 8PM is the second album by English electronic music group Faithless, released on 28 September 1998. The album contains the hit singles "Bring My Family Back", "Take the Long Way Home", and "God Is a DJ". The album reached number 10 on the UK Albums Chart. In 1999, Sunday 8PM was one of twelve albums to make the shortlist for the Mercury Prize.

== Versions ==
In 1998, there was a special release in the Netherlands: The Pinkpop Edition, which included a bonus CD with four live recordings ("God Is a DJ", "Bring My Family Back", "Do My Thing", and "If Lovin' You Is Wrong") from the Pinkpop festival of June 1998.

In 1999, the album was re-released as Sunday 8PM / Saturday 3AM, containing an extra CD with mixed versions.

The image on the album/CD cover is the Bluebird Theatre in Denver, Colorado, United States.

== Track listing ==
| No. | Title | Length |
|---|---|---|
| 1. | "The Garden" | 4:27 |
| 2. | "Bring My Family Back" (featuring Rachael Brown) | 6:22 |
| 3. | "Hour of Need" (featuring Rachael Brown) | 4:36 |
| 4. | "Postcards" (featuring Dido) | 4:01 |
| 5. | "Take the Long Way Home" | 7:13 |
| 6. | "Why Go?" (featuring Boy George) | 3:57 |
| 7. | "She's My Baby" (featuring Rachael Brown and Pauline Taylor) | 5:48 |
| 8. | "God Is a DJ" | 8:01 |
| 9. | "Hem of His Garment" (featuring Dido and Pauline Taylor) | 4:07 |
| 10. | "Sunday 8PM" | 2:42 |
| 11. | "Killer's Lullaby" | 6:10 |

Saturday 3AM
| No. | Title | Length |
|---|---|---|
| 1. | "The Garden" (End of Summer Intro by Venom & Hempolics) | 1:30 |
| 2. | "Killer's Lullaby" (Nightmares on Wax Mix) | 5:24 |
| 3. | "Take the Long Way Home" (End of the Road Mix by Jan Driver & The Timewriter) | 6:32 |
| 4. | "Bring My Family Back" (featuring Rachael Brown) (Paul van Dyk Mix) | 7:17 |
| 5. | "Sunday 8PM" (by Rollo and Sister Bliss) (A Time for Lovin' Mix) | 4:08 |
| 6. | "Hour of Need" (Skinny Mix by Matt Benbrook) | 3:47 |
| 7. | "Postcards" (featuring Dido) (Rewritten Mix by Rollo & Sister Bliss) | 3:32 |
| 8. | "God Is a DJ (Yes He Is)" (by Jason Howes, Rollo & Sister Bliss) | 8:38 |
| 9. | "Thank You" | 9:28 |
| 10. | "Why Go?" (featuring Boy George) (Radio Mix by Rollo & Sister Bliss) | 3:49 |

2001 special edition
| No. | Title | Length |
|---|---|---|
| 1. | "The Garden" | 4:27 |
| 2. | "Bring My Family Back" (featuring Rachael Brown) | 6:22 |
| 3. | "Hour of Need" (featuring Rachael Brown) | 4:36 |
| 4. | "Postcards" (featuring Dido) | 4:01 |
| 5. | "Take the Long Way Home" | 7:13 |
| 6. | "Why Go?" (featuring Boy George) | 3:57 |
| 7. | "She's My Baby" (featuring Rachael Brown and Pauline Taylor) | 5:48 |
| 8. | "God Is a DJ" | 8:01 |
| 9. | "Hem of His Garment" (featuring Dido and Pauline Taylor) | 4:07 |
| 10. | "Sunday 8PM" | 2:42 |
| 11. | "Killer's Lullaby" | 6:10 |
| 12. | "Killer's Lullaby" (Nightmares on Wax Remix) | 5:26 |
| 13. | "Bring My Family Back" (Paul Van Dyk Remix) | 7:15 |

== Charts ==
=== Weekly charts ===
| Chart (1998) | Peak position |
|---|---|
| Australian Albums (ARIA) | 41 |
| Austrian Albums (Ö3 Austria) | 23 |
| Belgian Albums (Ultratop Flanders) | 15 |
| Belgian Albums (Ultratop Wallonia) | 36 |
| Dutch Albums (Album Top 100) | 7 |
| German Albums (Offizielle Top 100) | 6 |
| Hungarian Albums (MAHASZ) | 32 |
| New Zealand Albums (RMNZ) | 21 |
| Norwegian Albums (VG-lista) | 4 |
| Swedish Albums (Sverigetopplistan) | 36 |
| Swiss Albums (Schweizer Hitparade) | 9 |
| UK Albums (Official Charts) | 10 |

=== Year-end charts ===
| Chart (1998) | Position |
|---|---|
| Dutch Albums (Album Top 100) | 92 |
| German Albums (Offizielle Top 100) | 88 |
| Chart (1999) | Position |
| Belgian Albums (Ultratop Flanders) | 93 |
| UK Albums (OCC) | 183 |

== Certifications and sales ==
| Region | Certification | Certified units/sales |
|---|---|---|
| Netherlands (NVPI) | Gold | 50,000^{^} |
| Switzerland (IFPI Switzerland) | Gold | 25,000^{^} |
| United Kingdom (BPI) | Gold | 100,000^{^} |
Summaries
| Europe | — | 950,000 |
^{^} Shipments figures based on certification alone.
