= Jamie Catto =

British singer

James David Catto (born 14 August 1968 in London, England) is a British musician, video director, photographer, and script editor. He was a founding member of Faithless, before leaving in 1999 to form 1 Giant Leap.

== Career ==
=== Faithless ===
Educated at Arnold House School in St. John's Wood, London, Catto became a founding member of Faithless, and was the one of two vocalists (along with Maxi Jazz), art director and video director of the band. He performed lead vocals on the Top 40 hit "Don't Leave", released in March 1996. His last album with Faithless was their second record, Sunday 8PM.

=== 1 Giant Leap ===
After leaving Faithless, Catto formed 1 Giant Leap with Duncan Bridgeman, touring areas including Senegal, Ghana, South Africa, Uganda, India, Thailand, Australia, New Zealand, America and Europe, with a digital video camera, a laptop and a stated intention to explore 'The Unity in the Diversity'. They released their first album in 2002. It was nominated for two Grammys in 2003 and sold around 300,000 copies.

The band collaborated with figures including Dennis Hopper, Kurt Vonnegut, Michael Stipe, Bono, Susan Sarandon, k.d. lang, Tom Robbins, Dido, Brian Eno, Tim Robbins, Daniel Lanois, Yoko Ono, J. P. Donleavy, Naomi Klein, Oumou Sangare, Billy Connolly, Baaba Maal, Rokia Traore, DBC Pierre, Neneh Cherry, Robbie Williams, Lila Downs, Bob Geldof, Neale Walsch, Stephen Fry, Gita Mehta, Linton Kwesi Johnson, Hariprasad Chaurasia, Speech, Mahotella Queens, and Michael Franti.

=== Later work ===
In 2004, Simon Fuller and 19 Entertainment backed the production of the second 1 Giant Leap film, TV series and CD, What About Me?. The project was released on DVD in June 2008 in the UK and won the Grand Jury Best Documentary at the Red Rock Film Festival at the first screening in America at the end of 2008. The film has received critical acclaim and additional screenings, including a special screening at the DocMiami International Film Festival in 2010.

Catto and Bridgeman travelled to 50 countries and five continents recording music and interviews. The documentary features Tim Robbins, Daniel Lanois, k.d. lang, Susan Sarandon, Zap Mama, Bob Geldof, Noam Chomsky, Billy Connolly, Marianne Williamson, Deepak Chopra, Neale Walsch, Courtney Love, Carrie Fisher, Bhagavan Das, Ram Dass, Oumou Sangare, Rokia Traore, Stephen Fry, Eckhart Tolle, Michael Franti, Michael Stipe, DBC Pierre, Will Young, Maxi Jazz, Mahotella Queens, Stewart Copeland, Lila Downs, Ramata Diakite, and others.

In 2011, Catto began teaching creative workshops such as What About You? - 'bring your dream project into the world' which had a strong self-development component and then developed them into playful and inspiring shadow-work experiences such as 'Transforming Shadows 'turn your demons into employees' and Insanely Gifted 'open the channel straight to flow-state'. He wrote a bestselling book in 2017 called Insanely Gifted - Turn Your Demons into Creative Rocket Fuel which was published by Canongate.

In 2019, Catto produced and directed his most recent film Becoming Nobody, a tribute to the spiritual teacher Ram Dass (a.k.a. Dr Richard Alpert) which received global acclaim and topped the charts on the Gaia online platform and Amazon Prime. He also composed the music for the film with Alex Forster especially drawing from his meditation album Internal - Music for Dissolving.

In 2020, Catto was a contributing key note speaker on The Human Potential Series: Transforming Uncertainty into Action. The speaker series included writers Marianne Williamson, A. H. Almaas and Charles Eisenstein, and focused on offering practical and spiritual support for people during the COVID-19 pandemic.

He is currently living in Oxford running his teacher-training 'Bring It!' and his other workshops from his home and in development on his new film Adam and Eve - Healing the Primary Wound of the Planet.
