= Salva Mea =

1995 single by Faithless

- UK CD 1

Single by Faithless

from the album Reverence
- Released: 24 July 1995
- Length: 10:47
- Label: Cheeky
- Songwriters: Rollo; Sister Bliss; Maxi Jazz
- Producer: Rollo

Faithless singles chronology
"Salva Mea" (1995)	"Insomnia" (1995)
"Insomnia" (1996)	"Salva Mea" (1996)	"Reverence" (1997)

Music video
- "Salva Mea" on YouTube

Alternative covers
- UK CD 2

Alternative cover
- European cover

"Salva Mea" (faux Latin for "save me") is a song by British electronic band Faithless, written by members Rollo, Sister Bliss, and Maxi Jazz. The female vocals on all versions are performed by Rollo's sister Dido. "Salva Mea" was released in July 1995, by Cheeky Records, as the group's first single from their debut album, Reverence (1996), and became a hit on the UK Dance Singles Chart; following a re-release in 1996, it peaked at number nine on the UK Singles Chart. The single topped the US Hot Dance Club Play chart twice—during its first chart run in 1996 and again in 1997 when the track was remixed and reissued. A black-and-white music video was produced to promote the single, directed by British director Lindy Heymann.

== Critical reception ==
In a retrospective review of the Reverence album, Justin Chadwick from Albumism commented, "While 'Insomnia' is phenomenal, it was primarily the epic grandeur and sinister soundscape of 'Salva Mea' that blew me away and made me fall madly in love with Faithless' transcendent sound. Among the group's myriad standout songs, it's still my most beloved." Upon the 1995 release, Alan Jones from Music Week named it "the piece de résistance" of the album, noting that "the severely under-rated single" marked Rollo as "the Jim Steinman of dance music."

In November 1996, Everett True from Melody Maker wrote, "Starts off teasingly like Enigma, with smooth, sequenced female vocals, before breaking out into the most massive handbag house floor-filler imaginable, with beats as full-on and insidious as The Orbital's 'Box'. And, somewhere, it slips into one cool rap, courtesy of Maxi Jazz." Same year, Music Week gave it three out of five, stating that "this pizzicato synth-driven floorfiller, with its distinctive changes in tempo and vocals, should emulate their recent number three hit 'Insomnia'." Alan Jones added, "Finally, the inevitable has happened and Faithless's finest recording 'Salva Mea' is back with even more new mixes. As far over the top as Rollo & Sister Bliss have ever got, it's an epic tune and every inch a Top 10 hit."

== Track listings ==
- UK CD 1995
1. "Salva Mea" (Slow Version) – 4:11
2. "Salva Mea" (Epic Mix) – 11:51
3. "Salva Mea" (Tuff Mix) – 9:37
4. "Salva Mea" (Sister Bliss Remix) – 8:43
- Australian CD 1996
1. "Salva Mea" (Tuff Edit) – 4:02
2. "Salva Mea" (Epic Edit) – 4:51
3. "Salva Mea" (Radio Version) – 4:08
4. "Salva Mea" (Epic Mix) – 11:50
5. "Salva Mea" (Tuff Mix) – 9:33
6. "Salva Mea" (Sister Bliss Remix) – 8:42
7. "Salva Mea" (Floating Mix) – 8:11
- German CD 1996
1. "Salva Mea" (Radio Edit) – 3:47
2. "Salva Mea" (C.E.C. Edit) – 4:59
3. "Salva Mea" (Epic Edit) – 4:51
4. "Salva Mea" (96 Remix) – 9:11
5. "Salva Mea" (Way Out West Remix) – 7:48
6. "Salva Mea" (Tuff Mix) – 8:36
- US CD 1996
1. "Salva Mea" (Radio Version) – 4:08
2. "Salva Mea" (Epic Radio Version) – 4:51
3. "Salva Mea" (Epic Mix) – 11:48
4. "Salva Mea" (Tuff Mix) – 9:35
5. "Salva Mea" (Sister Bliss Remix) – 8:40
- UK CD 1 – 1997
1. "Salva Mea" (Radio Edit) – 4:36
2. "Salva Mea" (Epic Mix) – 11:51
3. "Salva Mea" (Way Out West Remix) – 7:48
4. "Salva Mea" (Slow Version) – 4:10
5. "Salva Mea" (Floating Mix) – 8:12
- UK CD 2 – 1997
1. "Salva Mea" (Radio Edit) – 4:36
2. "Salva Mea" (Epic Mix) – 11:51
3. "Salva Mea" (Sister Bliss Mix) – 8:43
4. "Salva Mea" (DJ Quicksilver Remix) – 6:52
5. "Salva Mea" (Tuff Mix) – 7:57

== Charts ==
=== Weekly charts ===
Chart (1995–1997)	Peak position
Austria (Ö3 Austria Top 40)	9
Belgium (Ultratop 50 Flanders)	32
Belgium (Ultratop 50 Wallonia)	38
Canada Dance/Urban (RPM)	12
Europe (Eurochart Hot 100)	17
France (SNEP)	29
Germany (GfK)	5
Iceland (Íslenski Listinn Topp 40)	8
Ireland (IRMA)	8
Israel (Israeli Singles Chart)	13
Netherlands (Dutch Top 40)	16
Netherlands (Single Top 100)	16
New Zealand (Recorded Music NZ)	46
Scottish Singles Sales (Official Charts)	9
Sweden (Sverigetopplistan)	30
Switzerland (Schweizer Hitparade)	1
UK Singles (Official Charts)	9
UK Dance (Official Charts)	9
UK Airplay (Music Week)	22
UK Pop Tip Club Chart (Music Week)	37
US Dance Club Songs (Billboard)	1

=== Year-end charts ===
Chart (1995)	Position
UK Club Chart (Music Week)	98

Chart (1996)	Position
Europe (Eurochart Hot 100)	86
Germany (Media Control)	37
UK Club Chart (Music Week)	67
US Dance Club Play (Billboard)	43

Chart (1997)	Position
US Dance Club Play (Billboard)	31

== Release history ==
Region	Date	Format(s)	Label(s)	Ref.
United Kingdom	24 July 1995	12-inch vinyl; CD; cassette	Cheeky	
United Kingdom (re-release)	9 December 1996	CD; cassette	Cheeky	
United Kingdom (re-release)	30 December 1996	12-inch vinyl	Cheeky	
