= Faithless =

English dance music band

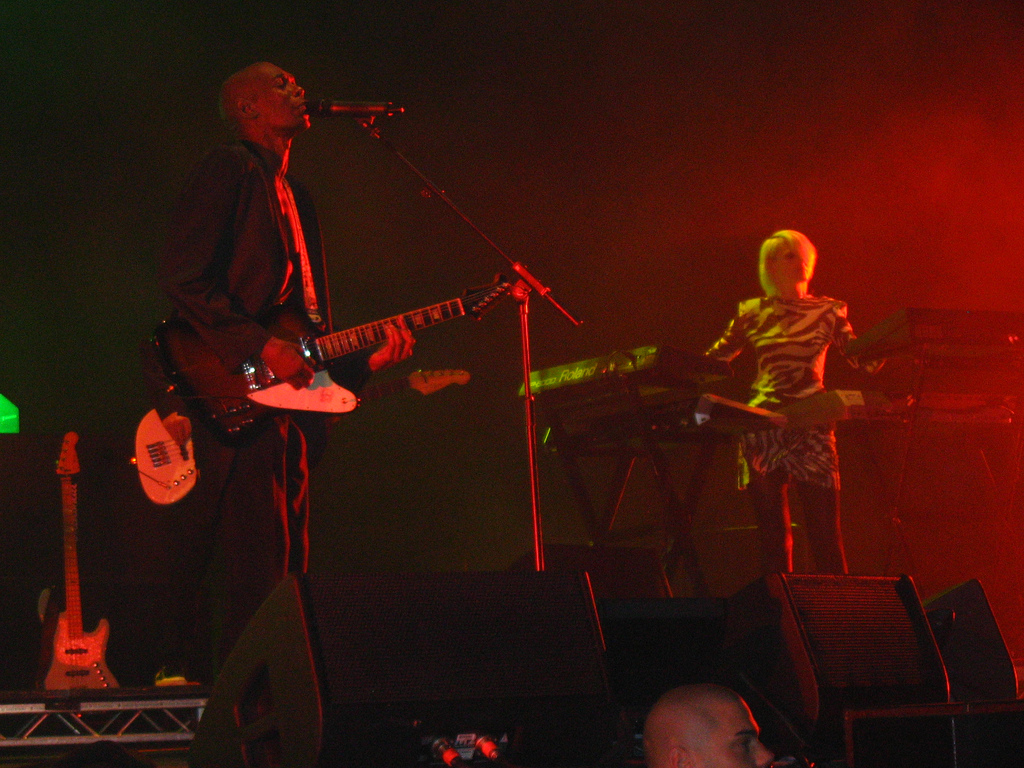
- Faithless performing at Budapest Sports Arena, on their last tour, The Dance Never Ends, on 21 March 2011

Background information
- Origin: London, England
- Genres: Electronic; trip hop; house; trance
- Years active: 1995–2011; 2015–present
- Labels: Sony; Arista
- Members: Sister Bliss; Rollo
- Past members: Jamie Catto; Maxi Jazz; Dave Randall; Aubrey Nunn; Sudha Kheterpal
- Website: faithless.co.uk

Faithless are an English dance music band that formed in 1995, with its core original members being Rollo, Sister Bliss and Maxi Jazz. During the band's initial period of success, Sister Bliss and Maxi Jazz contributed to studio recordings and toured frequently under the Faithless name, while Rollo served as a studio-only member, and has never performed live with the band. Their first album, Reverence, was released in 1996 and their most recent, Champion Sound, in 2025. They have sold millions of physical records, and their catalogue was uploaded to streaming sites in 2018. They average over four million listeners a month on Spotify. Faithless' records have charted at No. 1 in numerous countries and they were voted the 4th greatest dance band of all time by Mixmag.

Their lyrical style has been seen as sociopolitical. Their 2020 album All Blessed featured photo-journalist Yannis Behrakis' photograph of refugees in its artwork, and included immigration as its writing themes.

Faithless have headlined numerous major festivals in Europe and beyond, including four editions of Glastonbury.

== History ==
=== 1990s ===
Faithless were founded in 1995. Jazz had his musical beginnings in hip-hop, and was a rapper on the local scene in South London since the mid-1980s. Bliss' and Rollo's primary interests were in electronic music.

Faithless' first album Reverence was conceived as a mixtape which covers many genres, encapsulating house, hip-hop, folk and classical music. The album was released on Rollo's label, Cheeky Records.

Their first show at The Jazz Cafe in Camden to showcase Reverence was a sell-out, and a global tour ensued as the record went up the charts all over Europe. The singles "Insomnia" and "Salva Mea" each selling over a million copies, and album going either platinum or gold in every European territory.

The second studio album, Mercury-nominated Sunday 8PM, contained the global hit "God Is a DJ" and established Faithless as a major touring force in 1998. Emotive videos were directed by featured vocalist Jamie Catto, featuring the band's transcendent live shows, and helped bring Faithless’ live prowess to the attention of music fans. They were nominated for Best British Dance Act at the Brit Awards in 1999. The same year, Catto departed the band to form 1 Giant Leap.

=== 2000s ===
In 2001, their third album Outrospective was the first to be released on major label Sony BMG and gave rise to hit singles "We Come 1" and a tribute to Muhammad Ali. In 2002, they performed on the Pyramid stage at Glastonbury, with another nomination for best British Dance Act at The Brit Awards in the same year. They won Best Dance and Best Live Act at the TMF Awards in the Netherlands in 2001.

In 2004, their fourth album No Roots debuted at number 1 in the UK, conceived as a conceptual continuous piece of music in one key, with strong lyrical gravitas it featured vocals from Dido, new collaborator L.S.K, and the late Nina Simone. Dave Grohl of Nirvana and Foo Fighters cited Faithless’ hit protest song "Mass Destruction" as the song he most wished he had written during an interview with Q magazine, and the lyrics were quoted in the US Senate. A powerful video directed by award-winning directing team Dom & Nick alluded to abuses of power during the Iraq War to chilling effect, tracing the connection from childhood bullying to terrorism and genocide.

Encouraged by their label, Faithless released a Greatest Hits album, Forever Faithless. The Greatest Hits album went four times platinum and was the best-selling dance album of 2005. A huge global tour followed the success of the album.

Their fifth album, To All New Arrivals, was released in 2006. It was inspired by the uncertain futures facing Sister Bliss’ recently-born son, and Rollo’s young family, exploring themes of global poverty, immigration, conflict and belonging through the concept of "new arrivals". The first single "Bombs", with its anti-war message and video directed by director Howard Greenhalgh, was not playlisted on daytime MTV or BBC Radio 1. The album also featured collaborations with Cat Power and Robert Smith of The Cure. The band played Coachella Valley Festival in 2007.

=== 2010s: Hiatuses and Jazz's departure ===
Their sixth album The Dance was released on 16 May 2010, after a four-year recording break for the band, on their own label "Nate’s Tunes" – and was 2nd in the UK album charts behind The Rolling Stones. Faithless again played the Pyramid stage at Glastonbury in 2010, as well as other festivals around the world, and arenas. They were seen by over one million people and sold over 400,000 records. Faithless performed at Brixton Academy on 7 and 8 April 2011 and was transmitted live via satellite to cinemas across Europe.

In 2015, Faithless released a remix album under the banner of Faithless 2.0. The studio album featured contributions from the biggest names in electronic music including Avicii, Tiësto, Armin van Buuren, Claptone and Booka Shade. The album contained tracks from their 25-year career, encompassing seventeen Top 40 singles, six Top 10 albums and they embarked on a tour to celebrate the album released. In 2015 and 2016, the band played a series of live dates under the Faithless 2.0 banner, featuring Maxi Jazz and a full live band. Jazz left the group for the final time in 2016.

=== 2020s: All Blessed, death of Maxi Jazz, and Champion Sound ===
After a seven-year recording hiatus, the seventh Faithless studio album All Blessed was released in October 2020. The release came in the middle of the COVID-19 pandemic, with the themes of the album weaving around immigration, identity, empathy and lack of it. The first track that was officially released from the album came on the same weekend as the album release, Synthesizer, a love letter to electronic music. The album features vocals from newcomers Nathan Ball and spoken word artist & poet Suli Breaks, along with Caleb Femi. Other notable appearances on the album include Soul II Soul founder Jazzie B, Gaika, and Damien Jurado. Rollo said of the album, "We want to give them something else – something that could breathe." It continued their top 3 chart success in the UK and Europe.

On 23 December 2022, Maxi Jazz died "peacefully in his sleep" at his home in London, England at the age of 65. Seven days later, the band's compilation Forever Faithless re-entered the UK Album Downloads chart at number 7.

In January 2024, Bliss announced that Faithless were returning to the "live arena" after eight years, with the group confirmed for dates including Camp Bestival in Shropshire in August that year. On 12 July 2024, Faithless released the single "Find A Way", which features Suli Breaks. On the same day, they announced the title of their upcoming eighth studio album, Champion Sound. On 30 August 2024, the group released the single "I'm Not Alone (Rest Well Maxwell)" which features Amelia Fox and LSK (musician), in tribute to Maxi Jazz. On the same day, they announced The Champion Sound Tour, which will visit UK and European cities in November and December 2024.

On 25 April 2025, Faithless released the single "Dollars and Dimes", featuring Bebe Rexha. On 4 September 2025, they released a new, promotional single-version of "Find a Way", featuring Suli Breaks and Dido; Dido sings a new verse and chorus on the updated track. Champion Sound was released on 5 September 2025, to positive reviews.

== Other work ==
In between album releases, Faithless also released compilation albums revealing more of their personality and influence including the long-running Back to Mine sessions as well as NME in Association with War Child Presents 1 Love, The Bedroom Sessions and the Renaissance 3D music project, in conjunction with the iconic Renaissance nightclub.

As well as their own studio albums, all three members have actively engaged in other people's work as solo artists.

Sister Bliss is a dance DJ who has also scored numerous TV, film and theatre productions, along with presenting a Bauer Media show on Scala Radio.

Rollo released a solo record in 2019 under the moniker R PLUS called The Last Summer which features Dido. On 13 May 2022 he released WeDisappear, a collaboration album with Amelia Fox. "Makes Me Feel Good" and an edited version of "Let's Really Have Some Fun", released 28 April 2023, were released as singles. On 24 November 2023, the album, For Lovers, Not Killers was released, once again in collaboration with Amelia Fox. Rollo founded the label Cheeky Records and has produced the music of other artists, including his sister Dido's albums, as well as using various monikers to create popular dance music under the names Rollo Goes... (Camping, Mystic and Spiritual), Felix, Our Tribe (with Rob Dougan), and Dusted.

Maxi Jazz also collaborated with Faithless founding member Jamie Catto on his project 1 Giant Leap and released an album with his band Maxi Jazz and the E-Type Boys.

== Band members ==
Current members

- Sister Bliss (studio and live) – keyboards, synthesizers, piano, production, arrangement, mixer, composer, programming (1995–2011; 2015–present)
- Rollo (studio only) – keyboards, drum machine, guitar, bass, production, arrangement, mixer, composer, programming (1995–2011; 2015–present)

Collaborative and touring members

- Amelia Fox – lead vocals (2024–present)
- Nathan Ball – lead vocals (2024–present)
- LSK (musician) – lead and backing vocals (2004–2011; 2015)
- Max Radford – guitar (2024–present)
- Jonathan "Stan" White – bass (2007–present)
- Andy Treacey – drums (1998–2011, 2015–2016, 2024–present)
- Lily Gonzalez – percussion, backing vocals (2015–present)

Former members

- Maxi Jazz – lead vocals, guitar, programmer, production (1995–2011; 2015–2016, died 2022)
- Jamie Catto – lead and backing vocals, guitar, keyboards (1995–1999)
- Dave Randall – guitar (1996–1999 and 2004–2011)
- Aubrey Nunn – bass guitar (1995–2006)
- Sudha Kheterpal – percussion (1998–2011)
- Nemo Jones – guitar (2001–2002)
- Peredur Ap Gwynedd – guitar (2015–2016)

== Discography ==
- Reverence (1996)
- Sunday 8PM (1998)
- Outrospective (2001)
- No Roots (2004)
- To All New Arrivals (2006)
- The Dance (2010)
- All Blessed (2020)
- Champion Sound (2025)

== See also ==
- List of Billboard number-one dance hits
- List of artists who reached number one on the US dance chart
