= Sister Bliss =

British DJ, musician and songwriter (born 1970)

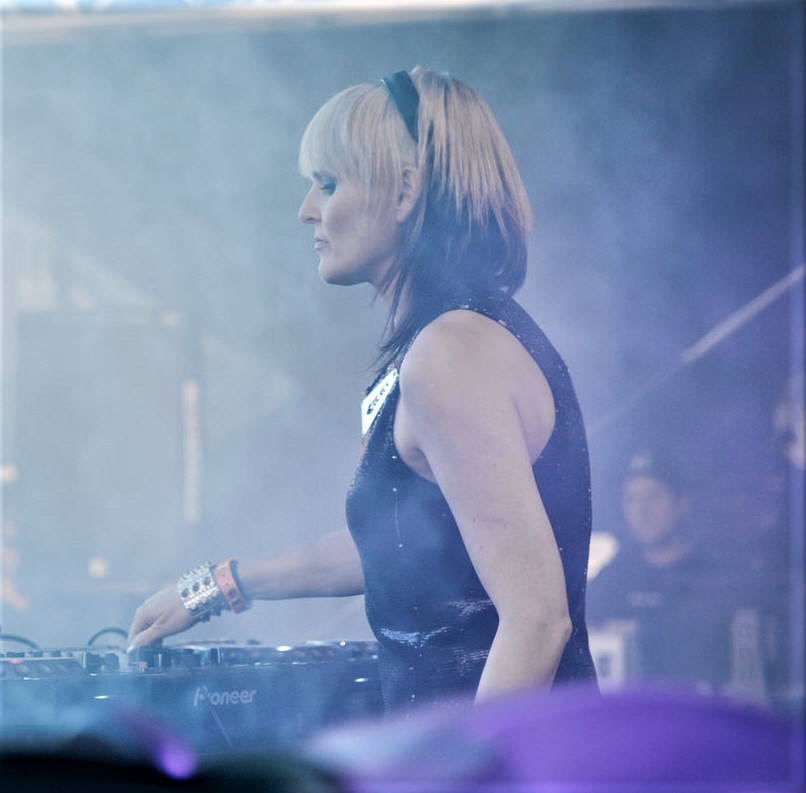
- Sister Bliss as a keyboard/DJ performer with her band Faithless in concert at Palmesus 2013, Kristiansand, Norway

Background information
- Born: Ayalah Deborah Bentovim; 30 December 1970 (age 55); Croydon, London, England
- Genres: House, psychedelic trance, progressive house, electronic, trip hop, trance
- Occupations: Musician, songwriter, record producer, DJ, keyboardist, pianist
- Instruments: Piano, synthesizer, keyboards

Ayalah Deborah Bentovim (born 30 December 1970), known professionally as Sister Bliss, is a British keyboardist, record producer, DJ and songwriter. In the studio, she is best known for her work with Rollo Armstrong as a member of the production duo Rollo & Sister Bliss; and she is particularly known as part of Faithless.

She is the niece of flautist Atarah Ben‑Tovim, who was principal flautist with the Royal Liverpool Philharmonic Orchestra in the 1960s and 1970s.

== Career ==
=== Faithless ===
Sister Bliss formed Faithless in 1995 with Rollo, Jamie Catto and Maxi Jazz. Bliss constructed most of the music of Faithless herself electronically, but also played the piano, violin, saxophone and bass guitar. Various others have been members and collaborators over the years including Zoë Johnston and, frequently, Rollo's sister Dido, who began her musical career providing backing vocals on Rollo's 1994 single 'Give Me Life' (under the pseudonym Mr V). Faithless toured extensively, and while Rollo preferred to stay in the studio, Sister Bliss could be seen on stage with Maxi Jazz. Faithless enjoyed a 17-year career that included 7 albums, including two number ones, and six top 10 singles. As of October 2013, Faithless had sold in excess of 15 million records worldwide and played live to millions across the world.

In 1996, she teamed up with Faithless bandmate Rollo to successfully remix Moby's recording of "That's When I Reach for My Revolver". Moby was so pleased they were asked to remix another song – "Honey".

She released a two-disc compilation entitled Headliners: 02 in 2001.

On 10 September 2006, she gave birth to a son named Nate. The track "Nate's Tune" found on the Faithless album To All New Arrivals is dedicated to him. Later on, Faithless founded their own record label called Nate's Tunes.

She released Nightmoves on 14 July 2008.

=== Post-Faithless ===
==== 2011–2014 ====
Following Faithless' retirement from touring in April 2011, she has concentrated on different projects. She presented a weekly show on Ministry of Sound Radio at 7 pm on Friday evenings.

Sister Bliss has collaborated with Dido, Boy George, Cat Power, Robert Smith (The Cure), The Temper Trap and Example amongst others. A gifted musician and composer, Sister Bliss has written music for film, TV and theatre. Credits include 2012ʼs film Knife Fight starring Rob Lowe, and directed by 2-times Oscar winner, Bill Guttentag, commissions for Sex and the City 2, Danny Boyleʼs The Beach, acclaimed British film The Hide, Crossing The Line and popular TV drama Life Begins. For theatre, Bliss has written music for The Black Album and The Emperor Jones at The National Theatre in London, as well as composing an original piece for the London Sinfonietta, which was performed at Fuse Festival, UK.

The Faithless Sound System – a stripped down live act featuring a live PA from Maxi Jazz, DJ set from Bliss and percussion – appeared at a number of festivals worldwide after the full Faithless band's split. The sets were typically one hour or less in duration. Bliss occasionally appeared at medium-sized clubs in the UK during this period, often as a headline DJ act playing sets of house music.

Junkdog Records, launched in 2013, released Sister Bliss solo singles, her remixing of others' tracks and also independent artists.

On 31 May 2013, she reunited with Maxi Jazz for a Faithless live PA and DJ set at the Electric Brixton nightclub in London. The 1,500 capacity event was in aid of the youth academy for Crystal Palace football club. A similar arrangement of her DJing house tracks between Faithless songs featuring Maxi Jazz on live vocals, was performed at a festival in the United States in March of the same year. The Brixton Electric gig was repeated on 6 June 2014 and was described as an "annual fundraiser", indicating that it would continue to be a once-yearly event.

She released the mid-tempo house track "Dancing Home" under the name of Bliss in 2014. Featuring Dutch vocalist Janne Schra, it was remixed by Tuff City Kids and Yoon.

==== 2022 onwards ====
On 17 March 2022, Bliss released the single "Life is a Melody", in collaboration with Faithless and Hyacinth & Apollo. Speaking about the collaboration, Bliss told NME:

It all started in a South London basement – I first saw Hyacinth & Apollo aka Grammy winner Jinadu & DJ/ producer Jem Haynes perform at a private gig in London I was DJing at – their live set totally blew me away. Following the liberating feeling of playing a huge number of festivals over the summer after multiple postponements due to the pandemic, I wanted to encapsulate that feeling of euphoria and intensity of being back on the road, and the power of music to bring us together once again.

Since 2024, Sister Bliss has been working in Faithless with vocalists Amelia Fox and Nathan Ball.

== Discography ==
=== Albums ===
List of albums
Title	Year	Label
Headliners: 02	2001	Ministry of Sound
Nightmoves	2008	Pieces of Eight

=== Singles ===
List of singles, with selected chart positions
Title	Year	Peak chart positions	
Title	Year	UK	AUS
"Best Thing" (as Miss Bliss)	1993	—	—
"Future Pulse" / "The Future Is Now"	1993	—	—
"Cantgetaman, Cantgetajob (Life's a Bitch!)" (featuring Colette)	1994	31	74
"Oh! What a World"	1995	40	—
"Bad Man"	1996	51	—
"Sister Sister"	2000	34	—
"Deliver Me" (featuring John Martyn)	2001	31	—
"Dancing Home"	2014	—	—
"How Long Can I Wait?" (featuring Wiley)	2018	—	—
"Life Is a Melody" (with Faithless and Hyacinth & Apollo)	2023	—	—
