= Rollo Armstrong =

British record producer (born 1966)

Rollo
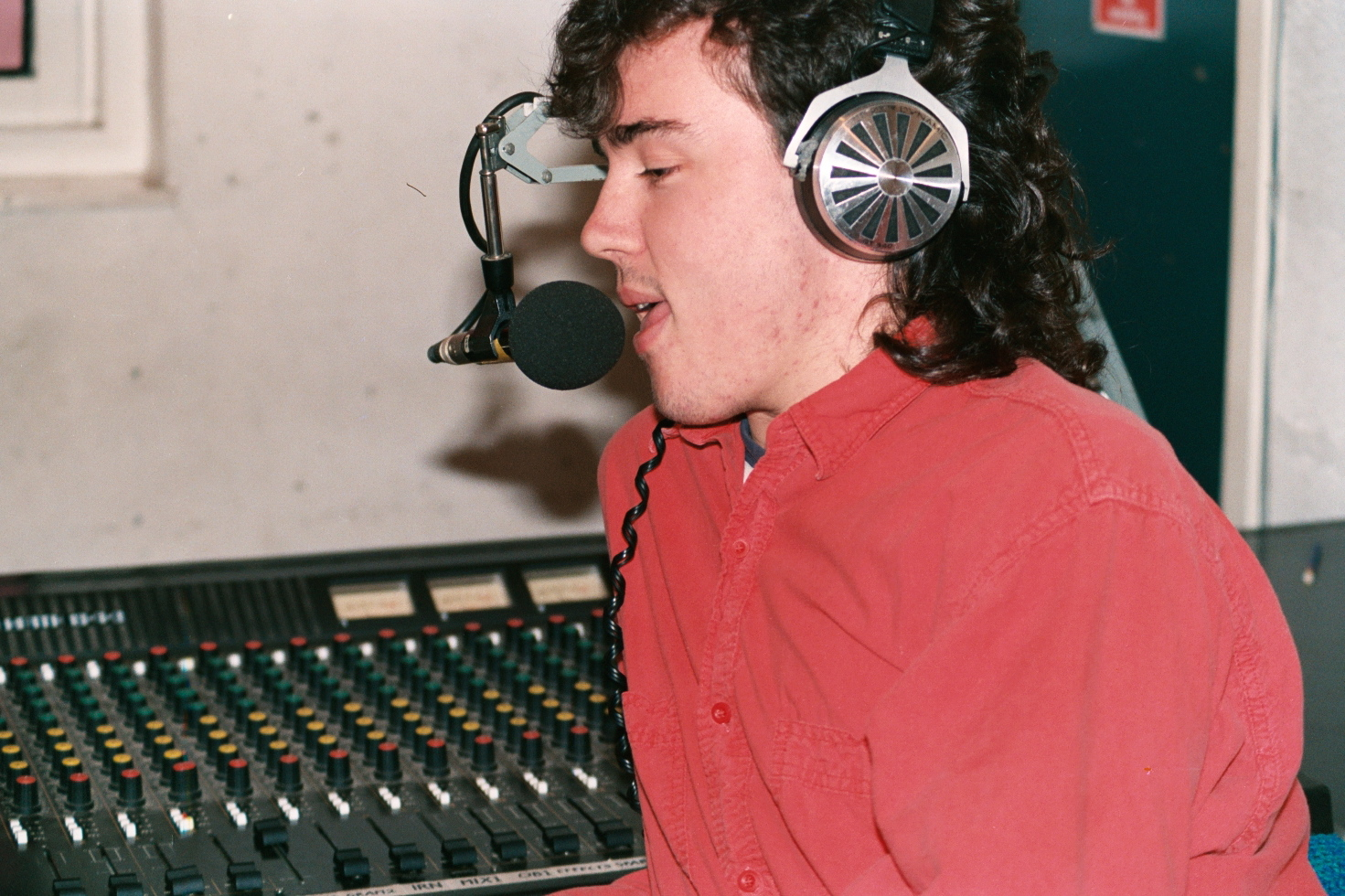
- Rollo in 1987

Background information
- Also known as: R Plus; The OT Quartet; Dignity
- Born: Rowland Constantine O'Malley Armstrong; 8 May 1966 (age 60); Kensington, London, England
- Occupation: Record producer
- Instruments: Keyboards, synthesiser
- Years active: 1991–present
- Label: Cheeky Records/BMG
- Member of: Faithless

Rowland Constantine O'Malley Armstrong (born 8 May 1966), known professionally as both Rollo and R Plus, is an English DJ and music producer. He is a member of the remix/production duo Rollo & Sister Bliss and is a founding, non-touring member of the electronic music group Faithless. He has produced and remixed many tracks for his sister Dido, as well as for Rob Dougan, Pet Shop Boys, Simply Red, R. Kelly, U2, Moby, Grace, Tricky and Suede. He is also known for producing the UEFA Euro 2008 theme, which is also used as UEFA Super Cup, UEFA Women's Championship, and youth tournaments theme since 2017 and also UEFA Women's Europa Cup theme.

== Early life ==
Rollo was born to an Irish publisher and a French-English poet. His younger sister is singer Dido. He studied at the University of York and was an active member of the student radio station URY. Later bandmate Sister Bliss has claimed that Rollo experiences synaesthesia, seeing "music as colours".

== Career ==
Rollo has appeared on a large number of music projects, both within groups and solo, using various monikers, including Faithless (which he formed in 1995 with Sister Bliss, Jamie Catto and Maxi Jazz), Rollo Goes ..., Our Tribe (with Rob Dougan), and Dusted.

In late 1991, Rollo founded Cheeky Records, releasing two singles before the label folded. In 1992 Champion Records stepped in to help with funding and advice, and the label was restarted, with Reverence by Faithless its first album release (it has since been bought out by BMG). In 1992, Rollo co-wrote and co-produced Felix's hit single "Don't You Want Me", which reached number 1 in Finland, Italy, Spain and Switzerland, as well as reaching number 6 on the UK Singles Chart.

In the United States, Rollo is known for his production work on Dido's albums: No Angel (1999), Life for Rent (2003), Safe Trip Home (2008), Girl Who Got Away (2013) and Still on My Mind (2019). Rollo was also a producer on singer-songwriter Kristine W's debut album, Land of the Living.

In 2008, Rollo composed the official melody of the UEFA Euro 2008 competition. and UEFA Euro 2012. He was nominated for an Academy Award in the category of Best Original Song for his work with A.R. Rahman and Dido on "If I Rise", featuring in the 2010 Danny Boyle film 127 Hours.

=== R Plus ===
On 11 October 2019, Rollo released his first solo album, The Last Summer under the alias "R Plus". It charted at No. 96 on the UK Album Sales Chart and at No. 55 on the UK Album Download Chart. On 19 July 2020, The Last Summer (Deluxe Edition) was released, and credited as by both R Plus and Dido.

After moving record labels to Armada Music, Rollo (as R Plus) released a cover of Joy Division's 1980 hit "Love Will Tear Us Apart" on 7 May 2021, and features singer Amelia Fox. Rollo spoke of the remake: "[The song] meant the world to me when I was teenager, and it still does. I stole my first Joy Division T-shirt from a shop in Camden Market, and got to fleetingly meet guitarist Peter Hook years later at a party at the Hacienda in Manchester. It took a long time before I felt brave enough to cover this song, before I felt I knew what I was doing as a producer [...] To introduce Amelia Fox and the new R Plus album to the world, we thought it would be good to start with this cover. We wanted our version to sound like a piece of music found in a time capsule buried under the now empty DJ booth at the Hacienda, and wanted to capture both the sadness of the song and the late-night euphoria of that legendary club." In July 2021, R Plus released "Hey Lover" again featuring Fox.

On 13 May 2022, R Plus released WeDisappear, a collaboration album with Amelia Fox. "Makes Me Feel Good" and an edited version of "Let's Really Have Some Fun", released 28 April 2023, were released as singles. On 24 November 2023, R Plus released the album For Lovers, Not Killers, alongside Fox. Some streaming services erroneously list Faithless as a collaborative artist on R Plus releases, due to Armstrong's involvement in both projects.

== Discography ==
=== Albums ===
- 2000 When We Were Young, as Dusted (with Mark Bates)
- 2005 Safe From Harm (re-release of When We Were Young), as Dusted (with Mark Bates)
- 2005 Instrumentals, as Dusted (with Mark Bates)
- 2019 The Last Summer, as R Plus
- 2020 The Last Summer (Deluxe Edition), as R Plus (with Dido)
- 2022 WeDisappear, as R Plus (with Amelia Fox)
- 2023 For Lovers, not Killers, as R Plus (with Amelia Fox)

=== Singles ===
Dusted
all produced with Mark Bates

- 1997 "Deeper River" (with Pauline Taylor)
- 2000 "Always Remember To Respect And Honour Your Mother"
- 2000 "Childhood/Want You"
- 2001 "Under The Sun"

Rollo & Rob D productions
all produced with Rob Dougan

- 1993 "I Believe In You", as Our Tribe (with Colette)
- 1994 "Love Come Home", as Our Tribe (with Frankie Pharaoh and Kristine W)
- 1994 "High", as O.T. Tunes
- 1994 "Hold That Sucker Down", as The O.T. Quartet (with Colette)
- 1995 "Hold That Sucker Down '95", as The O.T. Quartet (with Colette)
- 1995 "High As A Kite", as One Tribe (with Roger)
- 1995 "What Hope Have I", as Sphinx (with Sabrina Johnston)
- 2000 "Hold That Sucker Down 2000", as The O.T. Quartet (with Colette)
- 2005 "Hold That Sucker Down 2005", as The O.T. Quartet (with Colette)
- 2007 "What Hope Have I (Remixes)", as Sphinx (with Sabrina Johnston)

Rollo Goes...

- 1993 "Get Off Your High Horse", as Rollo Goes Camping (with Sister Bliss and Colette) – UK No. 43
- 1995 "Love, Love, Here I Come", as Rollo Goes Mystic (with Sister Bliss and Pauline Taylor) – UK No. 32
- 1996 "Let This Be A Prayer", as Rollo Goes Spiritual (with Sister Bliss and Pauline Taylor)- UK No. 26
- 1997 "Love, Love, Here I Come '97", as Rollo Goes Mystic (with Sister Bliss and Pauline Taylor)

Other aliases

- 1992 "Hypnotized", as High On Love (with Chris Rushby)
- 1992 "A Million Ways", as Stoned Democracy (with Chris Rushby)
- 1993 "In My World", as High On Love (with Chris Rushby)
- 1993 "Close (Like An Overdose)", as Stoned Democracy (with Chris Rushby)
- 1994 "Give Me Life", as Mr. V (with Rob Villiers)
- 1996 "Help Me Make It", as Huff & Puff (with Ben Langmaid and Sister Bliss)
- 2000 "Born Again", as Huff & Puff (with Ben Langmaid)

R Plus

List of singles as lead artist, showing year released and originating album
Title	Year	Album
"Summer Dress" (featuring Dido)	2019	The Last Summer
"Those Were The Days" (featuring Dido)	2019	The Last Summer
"My Boy" (featuring Dido)	2019	The Last Summer
"Together (In These Times)" (featuring Dido)	2020	Non-album singles
"Love Will Tear Us Apart" (featuring Amelia Fox)	2021	Non-album singles
"Hey Lover" (featuring Amelia Fox)	2021	WeDisappear
"Hold On To Your Heart" (featuring Amelia Fox)	2021	WeDisappear
"This Girl Is Gone" (featuring Amelia Fox)	2022	WeDisappear
"Makes Me Feel Good" (featuring Amelia Fox)	2022	WeDisappear
"U Disappear" (featuring Amelia Fox)	2022	WeDisappear
"Love Makes Me Feel Good" (featuring Amelia Fox)	2022	WeDisappear
"It's Enough (The Last High)" (featuring Amelia Fox)	2023	WeDisappear
"Let's Really Have Some Fun" (featuring Amelia Fox)	2023	WeDisappear

Single production for other artists

- 1992 Felix – "Don't You Want Me" (with Red Jerry)
- 1992 Felix – "It Will Make Me Crazy"
- 1992 Frankë – "Understand This Groove" (with Rob Dougan)
- 1993 Frankë – "We're On A Mission"
- 1993 U.S.U.R.A. – "Tear It Up"
- 1994 Sister Bliss – "Cantgetaman, Cantgetajob (Life's A Bitch!)" (with Colette)
- 1994 Kristine W – "Feel What You Want" (with Rob Dougan)
- 1995 Kristine W – "One More Try" (with Rob Dougan)
- 1995 Kristine W – "Don't Wanna Think" (with Rob Dougan)
- 1995 Sister Bliss – "Oh! What A World" (with Colette)
- 1995 Sunscreem – "Exodus" (Tuff Mix)
- 1996 Kristine W – "Land Of The Living" (with Rob Dougan)
- 1996 Kristine W – "Sweet Mercy Me" (with Rob Dougan)
- 1996 Sister Bliss – "Bad Man" (with Junkdog Howler)
- 1996 Pauline Taylor – "Constantly Waiting" (with Sister Bliss and Matt Benbrook)
- 1998 Pauline Taylor – "The Letter" (with Matt Benbrook)
- 2000 Shawn Christopher – "So Wrong" (with Rob Dougan)
- 2000 Sister Bliss feat. John Martyn – "Deliver Me"
- 2000 Sister Bliss – "Sister Sister"
- 2001 Dido – "Thank You"
- 2003 Dido – "White Flag"
- 2003 Dido – "Life For Rent"
- 2004 Dido – "Don't Leave Home"
- 2004 Dido – "Sand In My Shoes"
- 2008 Dido – "Don't Believe In Love"
- 2009 Dido – "Quiet Times"
- 2013 Dido – "No Freedom"
- 2013 Dido – "End Of Night"
- 2019 Dido – "Take You Home"
- 2019 Dido – "Just Because"

Album production for other artists

- 1996 Kristine W – Land of the Living (with Rob Dougan)
- 1998 Pauline Taylor – Pauline Taylor
- 1999 Pet Shop Boys – Nightlife
- 2000 Dido – No Angel
- 2003 Dido – Life For Rent
- 2003 P*Nut – Sweet As
- 2005 Enigma – The Dusted Variations
- 2008 Dido – Safe Trip Home
- 2013 Dido – Girl Who Got Away
- 2019 Shey Baba – Requiem
- 2019 Dido – Still on my Mind
