= List of songs recorded by Dido =

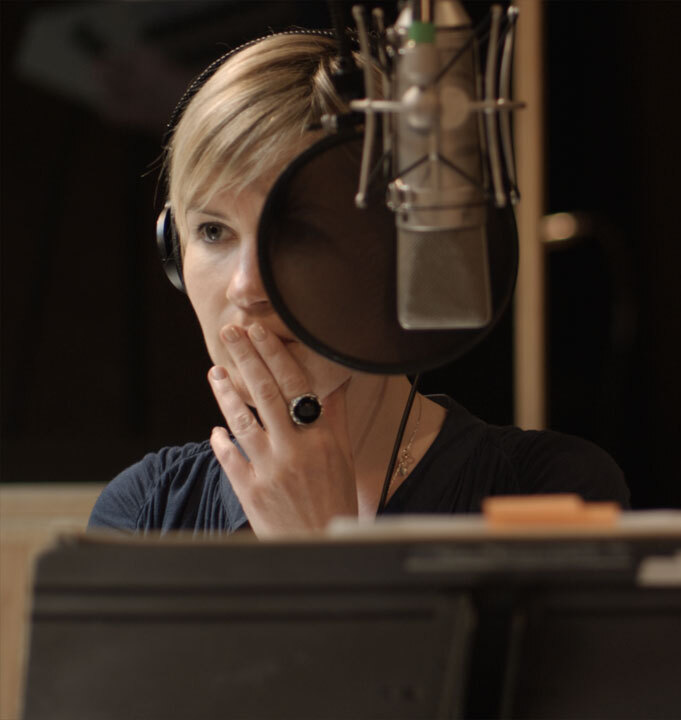
Dido in a recording studio in 2008

English singer-songwriter Dido has recorded songs for her four studio albums and collaborated with other artists for duets and featured songs on their respective albums. After collaborating with her brother, Rollo Armstrong, on his band's successful debut album Reverence (1996), she opted to pursue a solo career, signing a record deal with Arista Records the following year. Her first studio album, No Angel, was released in 1999 in the United States. Initially a modest commercial hit, its sales were boosted after its lead single, "Here with Me", became the theme song of the television series Roswell and its third single, "Thank You", was featured on the soundtrack to Sliding Doors and was sampled by American rapper Eminem in his hit song "Stan". No Angel received critical acclaim, and has sold over 12 million copies, becoming certified platinum twelve times. It topped music charts in thirteen countries and became the best-selling debut by any female British artist.

In 2003, Arista Records released Dido's second album, Life for Rent. It experienced commercial success, and became the fastest-selling album by a female solo artist in UK history. Its lead single, "White Flag", was nominated for the Grammy Award for Best Female Pop Vocal Performance and won the BRIT Award for Best British Single and the Ivor Novello Award for International Hit of the Year.

During a five-year hiatus, Dido moved from London to Los Angeles to write and record her third album, Safe Trip Home, which was released in 2008. It was the first to feature co-producer Jon Brion. Its first official single was "Don't Believe in Love". In 2010, Dido collaborated with composer A. R. Rahman and recorded "If I Rise" for the film 127 Hours, eventually earning an Academy Award nomination for Best Original Song. Dido initially planned to follow up with Safe Trip Home relatively quickly with her fourth studio album, Girl Who Got Away, but a pregnancy delayed its release to 2013.

Dido released her fifth studio album in 2019 entitled Still on My Mind to generally favourable reviews.. It featured the singles "Give You Up", "Take You Home", "Friends" and "Just Because".

== List of songs ==
Key
†	Indicates single release

List of songs recorded by Dido
Song	Artist(s)	Writer(s)	Original release	Year	Ref.
"7 Seconds"	Dido feat. Youssou N'Dour		Live 8	2005	
"All I See"	Dido	Dido	Girl Who Got Away	2013	
"All You Want" †	Dido	Dido; Paul Herman; Rollo Armstrong	No Angel	1999	
"Blackbird"	Dido	Dido; Rollo Armstrong	Girl Who Got Away	2013	
"Burnin Love"	Dido with Citizen Cope	Dido; Clarence Greenwood	Safe Trip Home	2008	
"Christmas Day"	Dido	Dido; Rollo Armstrong	Platinum Christmas	2000	
"Closer"	Dido	Dido; Rollo Armstrong; Rick Nowels	Life for Rent	2003 (hidden track)	
"Day Before We Went to War"	Dido	Dido; Rollo Armstrong; Brian Eno	Girl Who Got Away	2013	
"Do They Know It's Christmas?" †	Dido with Band Aid 20	Bob Geldof; Midge Ure		2004	
"Don't Believe in Love" †	Dido	Dido; Jon Brion; Rollo Armstrong	Safe Trip Home	2008	
"Don't Leave Home" †	Dido	Dido; Rollo Armstrong	Life for Rent	2003	
"Don't Think of Me" †	Dido	Dido; Rollo Armstrong; Pauline Taylor; Paul Herman	No Angel	1999	
"Do You Have a Little Time"	Dido	Dido; Rick Nowels; Mark Bates	Life for Rent	2003	
"Dub Be Good to Me"	Dido	James Harris; Terry Lewis	War Child: 1 Love	2000	
"End of Night" †	Dido	Dido; Greg Kurstin	Girl Who Got Away	2013	
"Everything to Lose" †	Dido	Dido; Rollo Armstrong; Ayalah Bentovim	Girl Who Got Away	2013; Bonus track	
"Feelin Good" †	Faithless feat. Dido	Dido; Sister Bliss; Maxi Jazz; Rollo Armstrong	The Dance	2000	
"Feels Like Fire" †	Santana feat. Dido	Dido; Rollo Armstrong; Klaus Derendorf	Shaman	2002	
"Fire and Rain"	Dido		Sounds Eclectic: The Covers Project	2007	
"For One Day"	Dido	Dido	Safe Trip Home	2008	
"Girl Who Got Away"	Dido	Dido; Rollo Armstrong	Girl Who Got Away	2013	
"Go Dreaming"	Dido	Dido; Rollo Armstrong; Rick Nowels	Girl Who Got Away	2013	
"Grafton Street"	Dido	Dido; Rollo Armstrong; Brian Eno	Safe Trip Home	2008	
"Happy New Year"	Dido	Dido; Greg Kurstin; Rollo Armstrong	Girl Who Got Away	2013	
"Here with Me" †	Dido	Dido; Paul Statham; Pascal Gabriel	No Angel	1999	
"Honestly OK"	Dido	Dido; Matty Benbrook; Rollo Armstrong	No Angel	1999	
"Hunter" †	Dido	Dido; Rollo Armstrong	No Angel	1999	
"If I Rise" †	A. R. Rahman / Dido	A. R. Rahman; Dido	127 Hours: Music from the Motion Picture	2010	
"I Eat Dinner (When the Hunger's Gone)"	Dido / Rufus Wainwright	Kate McGarrigle	Bridget Jones: The Edge of Reason	2004	
"I'm No Angel"	Dido	Dido; Paul Statham; Pascal Gabriel	No Angel	1999	
"Isabel"	Dido	Dido; Rollo Armstrong	No Angel	1999	
"It Comes and It Goes" †	Dido	Dido; Jon Brion; Rollo Armstrong	Safe Trip Home	2008	
"Just Say Yes"	Dido	Dido; Lester Mendez; Rollo Armstrong	Girl Who Got Away	2013; Bonus track	
"Last This Day"	Faithless feat. Dido	Dido; Rollo Armstrong	To All New Arrivals	2006	
"Let Us Move On" †	Dido feat. Kendrick Lamar	Dido; Rollo Armstrong; Jeff Bhasker; Kendrick Lamar; Pat Reynolds	Girl Who Got Away	2013	
"Let's Do the Things We Normally Do"	Dido	Dido; Jon Brion	Safe Trip Home	2008	
"Let's Runaway"	Dido	Dido; Greg Kurstin	Girl Who Got Away	2006; Bonus track	
"Life for Rent" †	Dido	Dido; Rollo Armstrong	Life for Rent	2003	
"Look No Further" †	Dido	Dido; Jon Brion; Rollo Armstrong	Safe Trip Home	2008	
"Lost"	Dido	Dido; Jon Brion; Matt Chamberlain	Girl Who Got Away	2013; Bonus track	
"Love to Blame"	Dido	Dido; Rollo Armstrong; John Harrison; Vera Bohl	Girl Who Got Away	2013	
"Loveless Hearts"	Dido	Dido; Rollo Armstrong	Girl Who Got Away	2013	
"Mary's in India"	Dido	Dido; Rollo Armstrong	Life for Rent	2003	
"Me"	Dido		No Angel	1999; Bonus track	
"My Life"	Dido	Dido; Rollo Armstrong; Mark Bates	No Angel	1999	
"My Lover's Gone"	Dido	Dido; Jamie Catto	No Angel	1999	
"Never Want to Say It's Love"	Dido	Dido; Jon Brion; Rollo Armstrong	Safe Trip Home	2008	
"No Freedom" †	Dido	Dido; Rick Nowels	Girl Who Got Away	2013	
"North Star"	Faithless feat. Dido	Dido; Sister Bliss; Maxi Jazz; Rollo Armstrong	The Dance	2000	
"Northern Skies"	Dido	Dido; Rollo Armstrong	Safe Trip Home	2008	
"One Step Too Far" †	Faithless feat. Dido	Dido; Sister Bliss; Maxi Jazz; Rollo Armstrong	Outrospective	2002	
"Paris"	Dido	Dido; Rick Nowels	White Flag/Paris	2003	
"Quiet Times" †	Dido	Dido	Safe Trip Home	2008	
"Sand in My Shoes" †	Dido	Dido; Rick Nowels	Life for Rent	2003	
"See the Sun"	Dido	Dido	Life for Rent	2003	
"See You When You're 40"	Dido	Dido; Aubrey Nunn; Rollo Armstrong	Life for Rent	2003	
"Sing" †	Annie Lennox feat. Dido and others	Annie Lennox	Songs of Mass Destruction	2007	
"Sitting on the Roof of the World"	Dido	Dido; Rick Nowels; Rollo Armstrong	Girl Who Got Away	2013	
"Slide"	Dido	Dido; Paul Herman	No Angel	1999	
"Smalltown Boy" †	Dido	Bronski Beat	BBC2	2013	
"Stan" †	Eminem feat. Dido	Dido; Paul Herman; Eminem	The Marshall Mathers LP	1999	
"Stoned"	Dido	Dido; Lester Mendez; Rollo Armstrong	Life for Rent	2003	
"Summer"	Dido	Dido	Safe Trip Home	2008	
"Take My Hand"	Dido	Dido; Richard Dekkard	No Angel	1999	
"Thank You" †	Dido	Dido; Paul Herman	No Angel	1999	
"The Day Before the Day"	Dido	Dido; Rollo Armstrong	Safe Trip Home	2008	
"This Land Is Mine"	Dido	Dido; Rick Nowels; Rollo Armstrong	Life for Rent	2003	
"Us 2 Little Gods"	Dido	Dido; Rollo Armstrong; Daisy Gough; Rick Nowels	Safe Trip Home	2008	
"White Flag" †	Dido	Dido; Rick Nowels; Rollo Armstrong	Life for Rent	2003	
"Who Makes You Feel"	Dido	Dido; Rollo Armstrong p*nut	Life for Rent	2003	
"Worthless"	Dido	Dido; Rollo Armstrong; Sister Bliss	No Angel	1999; Bonus track	
