= Dido discography =

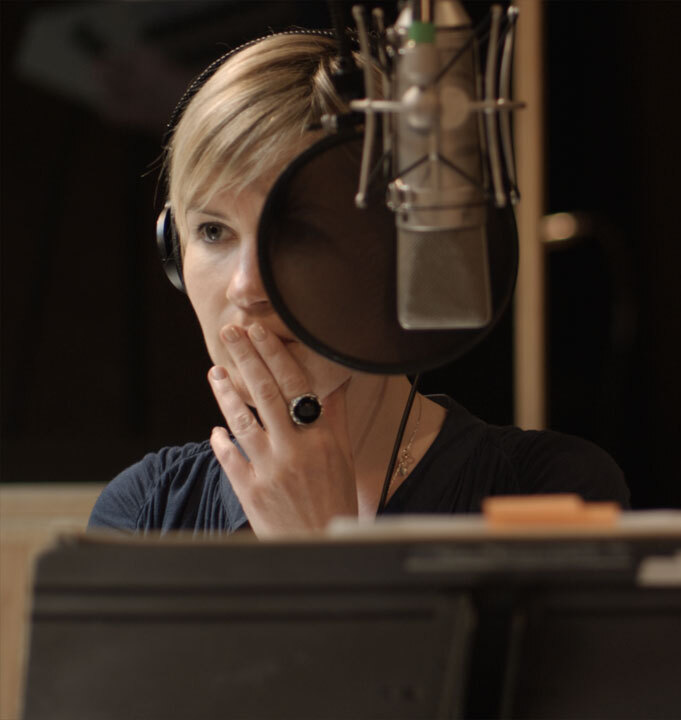
- Dido in the recording studio, 2008
- Studio albums: 6
- Extended plays: 2
- Singles: 31
- Video albums: 1
- Music videos: 24
- Other appearances: 21

The discography of Dido, a British pop singer, consists of six studio albums, one demo album (Odds & Ends), two extended plays, 31 singles, and one video album. She debuted in 1993, performing and touring with trip hop group Faithless. In 1997, she began composing solo material and signed a recording contract with Arista Records in the United States.

No Angel, Dido's debut album, was released in June 1999. The following year, rapper Eminem sampled the song "Thank You" in his song "Stan". "Stan" reached number one in the United Kingdom and was certified platinum. The success of the single introduced Dido and No Angel to a worldwide audience. No Angel, composed of pop, rock and electronica songs, reached number one and was certified platinum ten times in the UK. In the US, the album reached number four and was certified platinum four times. The record experienced international success; it sold over 15 million albums. It produced seven singles, three of which reached the top twenty in the UK. In 2002, the album won a BRIT Award for Best British Album.

Her second album, Life for Rent, was released in September 2003. The album reached number one and went platinum nine times in the UK. It reached number four in the US and was certified double platinum. Life for Rent sold 13 million records and produced four top forty singles. In 2004, the album's lead single "White Flag" won a BRIT Award for Best British Single and an Ivor Novello Award for International Hit of the Year. Safe Trip Home, Dido's third album, was released in November 2008. It reached number two in the UK and number thirteen in the US. "Don't Believe in Love" was released as the lead single from the album in October 2008, becoming a modest hit in the United Kingdom, charting at number 54 on the UK Singles Chart; the song also charted in Austria, Belgium, Italy, the Netherlands and Switzerland.

Girl Who Got Away, Dido's fourth album, was released in March 2013 and reached number five in the UK. "No Freedom" was released as the lead single from the album in January 2013 and peaked at number 51 in the United Kingdom, also charting across mainland Europe. "End of Night" was released as the second single from the album in May 2013, but failed to chart on any major charts. Since 1999, Dido has sold over 40 million albums worldwide. Greatest Hits, Dido's first compilation album, was released in November 2013, it reached number 27 in the UK. The album compiles all of Dido's singles from her four albums No Angel (1999), Life for Rent (2003), Safe Trip Home (2008) and Girl Who Got Away (2013). The album also includes a new track, "NYC", as well as a collection of remixes and collaborations. Dido's fifth studio album, Still on My Mind was released on 8 March 2019 ad charted at number 3 on the Official UK Album chart, number 1 on the UK Indie Album chart and sold over 60,000 copies in that country. In 2020, Dido was co-lead artist on her brother Rollo's project The Last Summer (Deluxe Edition).

== Albums ==
=== Studio albums ===
Title	Details	Peak chart positions										Sales	Certifications
Title	Details	UK	AUS	CAN	FRA	GER	IRL	NLD	NZ	SWI	US	Sales	Certifications
No Angel	Released: 14 June 1999 (UK); Label: Arista; Formats: CD, DVD, LP, cassette, digital download	1	1	4	1	2	1	3	1	2	4	UK: 3,081,716 (Note: Sales as of December 2013); US: 4,200,000 (Note: Sales as of November 2008); World: 15,000,000 (Note: Worldwide sales as of December 2001)	BPI: 10× Platinum; ARIA: 6× Platinum; BVMI: 3× Gold; IFPI SWI: 3× Platinum; MC: 4× Platinum; NVPI: Platinum; RIAA: 4× Platinum; RMNZ: 5× Platinum; SNEP: Diamond
Life for Rent	Released: 29 September 2003 (UK); Label: Arista; Formats: CD, LP, cassette, digital download	1	1	2	1	1	1	1	1	1	4	UK: 2,881,364 (Note: Sales as of December 2013); US: 2,100,000 (Note: Sales as of November 2008); World: 13,000,000 (Note: Worldwide sales as of October 2007)	BPI: 9× Platinum; ARIA: 6× Platinum; BVMI: 3× Platinum; IFPI SWI: 3× Platinum; MC: 3× Platinum; NVPI: Platinum; RIAA: 2× Platinum; RMNZ: 4× Platinum; SNEP: 2× Platinum
Safe Trip Home	Released: 17 November 2008 (UK); Label: Arista; Formats: CD, digital download	2	6	9	3	3	11	8	6	1	13	UK: 285,000 (Note: Sales as of December 2013)	BPI: Gold; ARIA: Gold; BVMI: Gold; IFPI SWI: Platinum; IRMA: Gold; RMNZ: Gold; SNEP: Gold
Girl Who Got Away	Released: 4 March 2013 (UK); Label: RCA; Formats: CD, LP, digital download	5	12	10	3	2	14	8	11	2	32	UK: 90,230 (Note: Sales as of March 2019)	BPI: Silver
Still on My Mind	Released: 8 March 2019; Label: BMG; Formats: CD, LP, digital download	3	14	12	11	6	18	19	31	4	45		BPI: Silver; SNEP: Gold

=== Live albums ===
Title	Details	Peak chart positions			Certifications
Title	Details	AUS	GER	POR	Certifications
Live at Brixton Academy	Released: 21 June 2005 (UK); Label: Arista; Formats: CD, DVD, digital download	53	50	19	ARIA: Platinum

=== Compilation albums ===
Title	Details	Peak chart positions					Certifications
Title	Details	UK	AUS	FRA	IRL	SWI	Certifications
Greatest Hits	Released: 25 November 2013 (UK); Label: RCA; Formats: CD, digital download	27	96	170	41	57	BPI: Gold

=== Demo albums ===
Title	Details
Odds & Ends	Released: 1995; Label: Nettwerk; Formats: CD-R

=== Collaborative albums ===
Title	Details
The Last Summer (with R Plus)	Released: 19 July 2020; Label: BMG; Formats: CD, digital download

== Extended plays ==
Title	Details
The Highbury Fields EP	Released: 1999 (UK); Label: Arista; Formats: CD
Dido Live	Released: 2 June 2005 (UK); Label: Arista; Formats: Digital download

== Singles ==
=== As lead artist ===
Title	Year	Peak chart positions										Certifications	Album
Title	Year	UK	AUS	AUT	FRA	GER	IRL	NLD	NZ	SWI	US	Certifications	Album
"Here with Me"	1999	4	52	9	4	16	8	22	3	6	— (Note: "Here with Me" did not enter the Billboard Hot 100, but peaked at number sixteen on the Bubbling Under Hot 100 Singles chart, which acts as an extension to the Hot 100.)	BPI: Platinum; RMNZ: Platinum; SNEP: Gold	No Angel
"Don't Think of Me"	2000	—	—	—	—	—	—	—	—	—	— (Note: "Don't Think of Me" did not enter the US Billboard Hot 100, but peaked at number 35 on the US Billboard Adult Pop Airplay Chart.)		No Angel
"Thank You"	2000	3	—	25	30	41	5	29	3	16	3	BPI: Platinum; RIAA: Gold; RMNZ: 2× Platinum	No Angel
"Hunter"	2001	17	50	—	45	—	48	73	28	59	— (Note: "Hunter" did not enter the US Billboard Hot 100 Chart, but peaked at number 16 on the US Billboard Adult Pop Airplay Chart and at number 9 on the US Dance Club Songs Chart.)		No Angel
"All You Want"	2001	—	—	—	—	—	—	—	—	—	—		No Angel
"White Flag"	2003	2	1	1	5	1	2	5	12	2	18	BPI: 2× Platinum; ARIA: Gold; BVMI: Gold; IFPI AUT: Gold; IFPI SWI: Gold; RIAA: Gold; RMNZ: 2× Platinum	Life for Rent
"Life for Rent"	2003	8	28	31	24	33	8	24	17	19	—	BPI: Silver	Life for Rent
"Don't Leave Home"	2004	25	—	54	—	67	35	38	—	45	— (Note: "Don't Leave Home" did not enter the US Billboard Hot 100 Chart but peaked at number 22 on the US Billboard Adult Pop Airplay Chart.)		Life for Rent
"Sand in My Shoes"	2004	29	37	57	—	54	27	59	—	95	— (Note: "Sand in My Shoes" did not enter the US Billboard Hot 100, but peaked at number 24 on the US Billboard Adult Pop Airplay Chart, and at number 1 on the US Billboard Dance Club Songs Chart.)		Life for Rent
"Don't Believe in Love"	2008	54	— (Note: "Don't Believe in Love" did not enter the Australian Singles Chart Top 100, but peaked at number 42 on the Australian Physical Singles Chart.)	29	—	—	—	83	—	16	—		Safe Trip Home
"Quiet Times"	2009	—	—	—	—	—	—	—	—	—	—		Safe Trip Home
"Everything to Lose"	2010	—	—	—	—	—	—	—	—	—	—		Sex and the City 2: Original Motion Picture Soundtrack
"No Freedom"	2013	51	—	—	64	59	—	98	—	28	—		Girl Who Got Away
"End of Night"	2013	—	—	—	—	—	—	—	—	—	—		Girl Who Got Away
"Give You Up"	2019	— (Note: "Give You Up" did not enter the UK Singles Chart, but peaked at number 34 on the UK Singles Downloads Chart.)	—	—	—	—	—	—	—	—	— (Note: "Give You Up" did not enter the Billboard Hot 100, but peaked at number 13 on the Adult Contemporary chart and number 1 on the Dance Club Songs chart.)		Still on My Mind
"Take You Home"	2019	—	—	—	—	—	—	—	—	—	—		Still on My Mind
"Friends"	2019	—	—	—	—	—	—	—	—	—	—		Still on My Mind
"Thank You (Not So Bad)" (with Dimitri Vegas & Like Mike, Tiesto and W&W)	2023	50	— (Note: "Thank You (Not So Bad)" did not enter the Australian Singles Chart but peaked at number 18 on the Australia Dance (ARIA))	14	85	16	36	14	—	14	— (Note: "Thank You (Not So Bad)" did not enter the Billboard Hot 100, but peaked at number 12 on the Hot Dance/Electronic Songs chart.)	BPI: Gold; BVMI: Platinum; IFPI AUT: 2× Platinum; IFPI SWI: Platinum; RMNZ: Platinum; SNEP: Gold	Non-album single
"—" denotes releases that did not chart or were not released to that country.

=== As featured artist ===
Title	Year	Peak chart positions										Certifications	Album
Title	Year	UK	AUS	AUT	FRA	GER	IRL	NLD	NZ	SWI	US	Certifications	Album
"Stan" (Eminem featuring Dido)	2000	1	1	1	4	1	1	3	14	1	51	BPI: 4× Platinum; ARIA: 9× Platinum; BVMI: 3× Gold; IFPI AUT: Gold; IFPI SWI: Gold; RIAA: 4× Platinum; RMNZ: 4× Platinum; SNEP: Platinum	The Marshall Mathers LP
"One Step Too Far" (Faithless featuring Dido)	2002	6	21	—	—	48	8	47	—	51	— (Note: "One Step Too Far" did not enter the US Billboard Hot 100, but peaked on the US Billboard Dance Club Songs and Billboard Dance Singles Sales charts at numbers 4 and 14, respectively.)		Outrospective
"Feels Like Fire" (Santana featuring Dido)	2003	—	—	—	—	—	—	—	26	—	—		Shaman
"Do They Know It's Christmas?" (with Band Aid 20)	2004	1	9	15	72	7	1	3	1	7	—	BPI: 2× Platinum	Non-album single
"Sing" (Annie Lennox featuring various artists)	2008	— (Note: "Sing" did not enter the UK Singles Chart Top 100, but peaked at number 161 on the extended chart.)	—	—	—	—	—	—	—	—	— (Note: "Sing" did not enter the US Billboard Hot 100, but peaked on the Billboard Adult Contemporary Chart at number 29, and the Billboard Dance Club Songs at number 18.)		Songs of Mass Destruction
"Feelin' Good" (Faithless featuring Dido)	2010	— (Note: "Sing" did not enter the UK Singles Chart Top 100, but peaked at number 125 on the extended chart.)	—	—	—	—	—	—	—	—	—		The Dance
"Summer Dress" (R Plus featuring Dido)	2019	—	—	—	—	—	—	—	—	—	—		The Last Summer
"Those Days" (R Plus featuring Dido)	2019	—	—	—	—	—	—	—	—	—	—		The Last Summer
"My Boy" (R Plus featuring Dido)	2019	—	—	—	—	—	—	—	—	—	—		The Last Summer
"Together (In These Times)" (R Plus featuring Dido)	2020	—	—	—	—	—	—	—	—	—	—		The Last Summer
"When Love Sucks" (Jason Derulo featuring Dido)	2023	—	—	—	—	—	—	—	—	—	—	SNEP: Gold	Nu King
"—" denotes releases that did not chart or were not released to that country.

=== Promotional singles ===
Title	Year	Peak chart positions		Album
Title	Year	FRA	SK	Album
"Let Us Move On" (featuring Kendrick Lamar)	2012	—	24	Girl Who Got Away
"Hurricanes"	2018	87	—	Still on My Mind
"Friends"	2018	—	—	Still on My Mind
"Chances"	2019	—	—	Still on My Mind
"Still on My Mind"	2019	—	—	Still on My Mind
"Find a Way" (with Faithless & Suli Breaks)	2025	—	—	Non-album single

== Guest appearances ==
Title	Year	Other artist(s)	Album
"Flowerstand Man"	1996	Faithless	Reverence
"Postcards"	1998	Faithless	Sunday 8PM
"Hem of His Garment"	1998	Faithless, Pauline Taylor	Sunday 8PM
"Dub Be Good To Me"	2002	Faithless	NME Presents: 1 Love
"Don't You Trust Me"	2004	2Pac	Loyal to the Game
"No Roots"	2004	Faithless	No Roots
"I Eat Dinner"	2004	Rufus Wainright	Bridget Jones: The Edge of Reason soundtrack
"Time Takes Time"	2005	Dusted	Safe from Harm
"Hurt U"	2005	Dusted	Safe from Harm
"Winter"	2005	Dusted	Safe from Harm
"Last This Day"	2006	Faithless	To All New Arrivals
"Fire and Rain"	2007	none	Sounds Eclectic: The Covers Project
"North Star"	2010	Faithless	The Dance
"If I Rise"	2010	A. R. Rahman	127 Hours: Music from the Motion Picture
"Beside the Sea"	2017	Damien Dempsey	Soulsun
"Together"	2019	R Plus	The Last Summer
"Cards"	2019	R Plus	The Last Summer
"Look Up!"	2019	R Plus	The Last Summer
"Fly to You"	2023	Caroline Polachek, Grimes	Desire, I Want to Turn into You

== Music videos ==
Title	Year	Director(s)
As lead artist
"Here with Me" (version 1)	1999	Big TV!
"Here with Me" (version 2)	2000	Liz Friedlander
"Thank You"	2001	David Meyers
"Hunter"	2001	Matthew Rolston
"All You Want"	2001	Russell Thomas
"White Flag"	2003	Joseph Kahn
"Life for Rent"	2003	Sophie Muller
"Don't Leave Home"	2004	Jake Nava
"Sand in My Shoes"	2004	Alex De Rakoff
"Don't Believe in Love"	2008	AlexandLiane
"Look No Further"	2008	Sally Williams
"It Comes and It Goes"	2008	Tinge Krishnan
"The Day Before the Day"	2008	Cristiana Miranda
"Us 2 Little Gods"	2009	Marcus Prado
"If I Rise" (with A. R. Rahman)	2011	—N/a
"No Freedom"	2013	Ethan Lader
"End of Night"	2013	De La Muerte
"Hurricanes" (lyric video)	2019	Peter Lawrie Winfield
"Give You Up"	2019	Sophie Muller
"Take You Home"	2019	Rankin
As featured artist
"Stan" (Eminem featuring Dido)	2000	Dr. Dre, Philip Atwell
"One Step Too Far" (Faithless featuring Dido)	2002	Liz Friedlander
"Do They Know It's Christmas?" (with Band Aid 20)	2004	Geoff Wonfor
"Feelin' Good" (Faithless featuring Dido)	2010	—N/a
