= Live at Brixton Academy (Dido album) =

Live album by Dido
- Released: 7 June 2005
- Recorded: 17-19 August 2004
- Venues: Brixton Academy, Brixton, London, England
- Genre: Pop
- Length: 91:00 (DVD); 58:00 (audio track)
- Labels: Arista, Cheeky, Sony BMG
- Producer: Jacqui Edenbrow

Dido chronology
Life for Rent (2003)	Live at Brixton Academy (2005)	Safe Trip Home (2008)

Alternative cover
- Cover art for Region 1

Live at Brixton Academy (released as Dido Live on Region 1) is a live album and DVD set by Dido, released in 2005. It was recorded over three nights in August 2004 at Brixton Academy in London during the Life for Rent tour. The DVD release includes a bonus audio CD which contains twelve of the recorded tracks, in a slightly modified order.

== Track listing ==
=== DVD track ===
1. "Stoned" – 5:58
2. "Here with Me" – 4:35
3. "See You When You're 40" – 5:55
4. "Life for Rent" – 3:55
5. "Hunter" – 4:16
6. "Isobel" – 4:48
7. "My Life" – 3:18
8. "Honestly OK" – 7:09
9. "Don't Leave Home" – 4:20
10. "Mary's in India" – 3:30
11. "Take My Hand" – 5:53
12. "Thank You" – 4:09
13. "Sand in My Shoes" – 5:17
14. "White Flag" – 4:16
15. "Do You Have a Little Time" – 2:43
16. "All You Want" – 3:55
17. "See the Sun" – 6:06

=== Bonus audio CD ===
1. "Stoned" – 5:58
2. "Here with Me" – 4:35
3. "See You When You're 40" – 5:55
4. "Life for Rent" – 3:55
5. "Isobel" – 4:48
6. "Honestly OK" – 7:09
7. "Take My Hand" – 5:53
8. "Thank You" – 4:09
9. "Mary's in India" – 3:30
10. "Sand in My Shoes" – 5:17
11. "White Flag" – 4:16
12. "See the Sun" – 6:06

== Personnel ==
- Dido – vocals
- Vini Miranda – guitar
- Keith Golden – bass guitar
- John Deley – keyboards
- Alex Alexander – drums
- Jody Linscott – percussion

== Charts ==
Chart performance for Live at Brixton Academy
Chart (2005)	Peak position
Australian Albums (ARIA)	53
German Albums (Offizielle Top 100)	50
Portuguese Albums (AFP)	19

== Certifications ==
Certifications for Live at Brixton Academy
Region	Certification	Certified units/sales
Australia (ARIA)	Platinum	15,000^{^}
France (SNEP)	Platinum	20,000^{*}
^{*} Sales figures based on certification alone.^{^} Shipments figures based on certification alone.
