= Mi Bebito Fiu Fiu =

Single by Tito Silva Music featuring Tefi C
- Language: Spanish
- English title: "My Little Baby Fiu Fiu"
- Released: May 20, 2022
- Genre: Parody; Latin pop; Latin ballad
- Songwriters: Alberto Antonio Silva; Zully Pinchi (Note: Contains an uncredited sample of "Stan", written by Marshall Mathers, and "Thank You", written by Dido Armstrong and Paul Herman.)
- Producer: Tito Silva Music

Tito Silva Music singles chronology
| "Granito de Mostaza 2" (remix) (2022) | "Mi Bebito Fiu Fiu" (2022) | "Kesezooo (Pintamos Toda la Casa, ¿Qué Es Eso?)" (2022) |

"Mi Bebito Fiu Fiu" (Spanish for "My Little Baby Fiu Fiu") (Note: "Fiu, fiu" is the Spanish-language onomatopoeia for a wolf whistle.) is a parody song by Peruvian DJ and producer Tito Silva Music featuring Peruvian vocalist Tefi C. It was released on May 20, 2022. Its instrumental base is the one in the song "Stan" by American rapper Eminem, which in turn is based on "Thank You" by British singer Dido. The song deals with the alleged romance and political scandal involving former Peruvian president Martín Vizcarra and Zully Pinchi, a candidate for the political party We Are Peru.

"Mi bebito fiu fiu" became a social and internet phenomenon. The song tells the story of Vizcarra's alleged infidelity to his wife, Maribel Díaz Cabello, with Pinchi.

== Background ==
The lyrics of "Mi bebito fiu fiu" were inspired by a series of leaked WhatsApp messages that Zully Pinchi Ramírez, a lawyer and former congressional candidate for the We Are Peru political party, sent to Martín Vizcarra. The conversation between them was revealed in the Peruvian TV show Panorama on 15 May 2022.

The Peruvian prosecutor investigated Vizcarra's trip to Cusco, which included a stay at Belmond Hotel Monasterio. Gossip magazines picked up the story and published leaked messages.

== Composition ==
After the revelation on the Panorama TV show, music producer Tito Silva composed the lyrics by interpolating phrases from the leaked private messages with a 2014 poem written by Pinchi titled "Las noches que te soñé". Tefi C. proposed the idea of creating the song and she provided the vocals.

== Popularity ==
In its first month, the official video clip of the song reached 10 million views on the YouTube Music platform. In June 2022, Tito Silva and Tefi C. performed the song on the program Yo soy de Latina, and appeared on television and radio programs, including 24 Horas on Panamericana Televisión.

The song became popular on TikTok platform, where it was used 84,000 times with more than 552 million views as of 7 July 2022, and went viral worldwide after Puerto Rican singer Bad Bunny mentioned it during a live stream on Instagram. After it became popular, Silva decided to remove it from streaming platforms to avoid legal issues to the composers of the baseline songs.

== Charts ==
Weekly chart performance for "Mi Bebito Fiu Fiu"
| Chart (2022) | Peak position |
|---|---|
| Honduras Pop (Monitor Latino) | 12 |
| Peru Pop (Monitor Latino) | 8 |
