= Odds & Ends (album) =

Demo album by Dido
- Released: 9 October 1995
- Recorded: 1993–1995
- Genre: Pop, trip hop
- Length: 46:32
- Label: Nettwerk
- Producer: Rollo Armstrong

Dido chronology
Odds & Ends (1995)	No Angel (1999)

Odds & Ends is a collection of unfinished tracks and demo recordings by British pop singer, Dido. The collection was put together by her management team, Nettwerk, and released promotionally in late 1995, in order to gain interest from record companies so that Dido could be signed to a major record label. All of the material was recorded between 1993 and 1995. Dido was brought to the attention of Arista Records, who were impressed with her collaborations and songwriting for the UK dance group Faithless, her work with a UK dance act spearheaded by her brother, Rollo Armstrong, and more importantly, the album. Arista Records signed Dido in the United States, eventually forming a deal with her brother Rollo Armstrong's record label, Cheeky Records, allowing her music to be released internationally. The track "Worthless" later appeared on The Highbury Fields EP, a five-track sampler released to promote her debut album, No Angel. "Take My Hand" was included on the album itself, and "Sweet Eyed Baby" was remixed to create another album track, "Don't Think of Me". "Worthless" and "Me" also appeared on the Japanese version of No Angel.

== Track listing ==
1. "Give Me Strength" – 4:17
2. "Reverb Song" – 0:45
3. "Take My Hand" – 6:42
4. "Me" – 2:38
5. "Sweet Eyed Baby" – 4:43
6. "Keep Your Faith in Me" – 4:03
7. "Too Bad" – 2:06
8. "Believe" (Flu Season Mix) – 6:32
9. "Worthless" – 7:52
10. "Hurry Home" – 3:15
11. "River, Run Me Dry" – 4:39
