= No Angel =

- Standard cover (Note: International special and Japanese editions cover features the background in silver rather than black and red. Digital reissue cover features Dido's image inside her name tinged pink, against a grey background. UK limited edition cover also features a grey background, but omits Dido's image from her name. 2025 vinyl reissue cover features photographic films, displaying imagery from the liner notes of No Angel tinged red, behind Dido's name.)

Studio album by Dido
- Released: 1 June 1999
- Recorded: 1995–1999
- Studios: Angel; The Church; Eden; Olympic; Sarm West; Swanyard (London)
- Genres: Folk-pop; folktronica
- Length: 51:51
- Labels: Arista; Cheeky
- Producers: Dido; Rollo; Rick Nowels; Youth; Duncan Bridgeman; Jamie Catto; Sister Bliss

Dido chronology
Odds & Ends (1995)	No Angel (1999)	Life for Rent (2003)

Singles from No Angel
- 1. "Here with Me" Released: 17 May 1999; 2. "Thank You" Released: 18 September 2000; 3. "Hunter" Released: 18 June 2001

No Angel is the debut studio album by English singer-songwriter Dido. It was released on 1 June 1999, by Arista Records and Cheeky Records.

Dido began recording what would become No Angel in 1995, having already written numerous songs, principally based on real-life circumstances at the time. She simultaneously collaborated with her brother Rollo Armstrong's electronic dance band Faithless, attracting the attention of Clive Davis, founder and then-president of Arista. Dido subsequently signed with the label and completed the album, predominantly producing it with Rollo. She wrote all of the album's tracks, exploring lyrical themes such as love, codependency, and introspection. Further collaborators on the record included Rick Nowels, Youth, Jamie Catto, and Sister Bliss, whose contributions resulted with a folk-pop and folktronica musical style experimenting with trip hop, electronica, and dream pop.

Due to contractual reasons, No Angel would not be released outside the US until 16 October 2000, when it was issued in Dido's native UK, being progressively made available worldwide in subsequent months. Upon release, the album received generally mixed to positive reviews from music critics, who complimented its sonic quality and Dido's vocal performance, but criticized the lyricism. Commercially a sleeper hit, the album debuted at low positions in both the UK and the US, before steadily ascending to number one on the UK Albums Chart and in nine other countries, and number four on the US Billboard 200. It became one of the best-selling albums of 2001 worldwide, and won British Album of the Year at the Brit Awards 2002.

No Angel produced three commercial singles—"Here with Me", "Thank You", and "Hunter". "Here with Me" and "Thank You" both reached the top five on the UK Singles Chart, while the latter peaked at number three on the US Billboard Hot 100, after receiving widespread exposure due to being sampled on Eminem's "Stan". To further promote the album, Dido embarked on an extensive world tour. No Angel went on to become one of the best-selling albums of all time in the UK, being certified decuple platinum by the British Phonographic Industry (BPI) for sales of three million units. It was also certified quadruple platinum by the Recording Industry Association of America (RIAA), selling over four million units in the US. The album has sold 15 million copies worldwide.

== Writing and recording ==
Dido began writing songs for what would become No Angel around 1994, as she signed multiple ephemeral management deals, as well as her first publishing deal. Suffering from depression and frequent panic attacks, she wrote "Honestly OK" and "Slide". Soon thereafter, she met the entertainment lawyer Bob Page, with whom she would be in a 12-year relationship. A day after meeting him, she wrote "Here with Me", "Thank You", "I'm No Angel", and "Take My Hand". In 1995, Dido began collaborating with her brother Rollo Armstrong's electronic dance music band Faithless, recording backing vocals for their debut studio album Reverence (1996) and co-writing its track "Flowerstand Man". She simultaneously recorded material for her own album, assembling an 11-track demo collection Odds & Ends, which circulated via Nettwerk Music Group, with whom she had recently signed a management deal. Alongside "Take My Hand", Odds & Ends included "Sweet Eyed Baby", which would later be remixed and retitled "Don't Think of Me", and the tracks "Worthless" and "Me", which would be included as bonus tracks on the Japanese edition of No Angel.

Dido spent 1996 touring with Faithless, recording additional songs while on tour, and signed a publishing deal with Warner Chappell Music that October. She recorded vocals for two tracks on Faithless' second studio album Sunday 8PM (1998), one of which incorporated elements of then-unreleased "My Lover's Gone". Her collaborative work with Faithless attracted attention of Clive Davis, founder and then-president of Arista Records, who instantly offered Dido a record deal with the label after attending their concert in London in 1998. She initially refused, opting to remain signed to Rollo's label Cheeky Records, but eventually accepted the offer after Rollo sold Cheeky to the Bertelsmann Music Group (BMG), Arista's parent company, in 1999, as she was finishing recording No Angel. Dido recorded over 25 songs for the album, 12 of which made the final track listing, at six locations in London—the Angel Recording Studios, The Church Studios, the Eden Studios, the Olympic Studios, Sarm West, and the Swanyard Studios. She wrote all of the album's tracks, and produced all except "Don't Think of Me", which is the sole track produced by Youth. Rollo co-wrote five and produced seven of the album's 12 tracks, while Rick Nowels produced three. Faithless members Jamie Catto and Sister Bliss also contributed to the album, with Catto co-writing and producing "My Lover's Gone", and Sister Bliss producing "Take My Hand" and co-writing and producing the bonus track "Worthless".

== Music and lyrics ==
"Thank You"
On "Thank You", Dido expresses appreciation for her partner, who helps diminish various inconveniences in her life. Christian Ward of NME described the song as reminiscent of The Corrs.

No Angel is, according to critical commentaries, predominantly a folk-pop and folktronica record, (Note: attributed to Natalie Shaw of BBC, Rob Brunner of Entertainment Weekly, Ikram Khasim of Fridae, and Sal Cinquemani of Slant Magazine) incorporating elements of genres such as trip hop and electronica. In The New Rolling Stone Album Guide (2004), journalist Ernesto Lechner further classified the album as a dream pop work. Its lyrical themes primarily encompass love, lust, and complexities of relationships and friendships. John Aizlewood of The Guardian described Dido's vocals as "ice-maiden" while possessing an "undertow of humanising vulnerability". Dido's vocal performance received frequent comparisons to Sarah McLachlan and Sinéad O'Connor, while numerous critics likened the album's musical style to Beth Orton. (Note: attributed to Cinquemani, Shaw, Dave Simpson of The Guardian, Russell Baillie of The New Zealand Herald, Christian Ward of NME, and Richard Leiby of The Washington Post) Further comparisons were made to Faithless, Dolores O'Riordan, Sting, and Peter Gabriel.

No Angel opens with "Here with Me", a "languid" folktronica track driven by "heart-monitor" synths and "dramatic" strings. The song depicts Dido as a woman dependent on her lover, attempting to imagine her life without him, while on "Hunter", she yearns to descend from the unsolicited pedestal he placed her on. String-infused "Don't Think of Me" shows a protagonist angrily scorning her former partner. "All You Want" details romantic loss from the perspective of a fixated lover, as evident in the lines: "I'd like to watch you sleep at night / To hear you breathe by my side" and "Now our bed is oh so cold / My hands feel empty, no one to hold / And I can sleep what side I want." "Thank You" expresses gratitude towards a partner alleviating different inconveniences. Musically, it is a ballad built on an acoustic guitar, congas, a recorder, and a drum machine. Folktronica and trip hop track "Honestly OK" displays a minimalist vocal arrangement against an electronic dub background, and is among the more introspective songs on the album: "I'm so lonely, I don't even want to be with myself anymore". "Slide" and "Isobel" are lyrical encouragements directed towards an anguished and remorseful friend. Syncopated up-tempo titular track "I'm No Angel" is followed by the blues-influenced closing track "My Life", built on "cinematic" strings and a Wurlitzer electronic piano. Lyrically, the latter sees Dido regaining control over her situation, concluding the events of the album's lyrics similarly to a romantic comedy climax, according to Natalie Shaw of BBC.

== Marketing and touring ==
Prior to the completion of No Angel, "Thank You" first appeared on the soundtrack for the 1998 film Sliding Doors. (Note: The 45 King first heard "Thank You" while watching the film, and subsequently produced a tape incorporating a sample from the song. He sent the tape to Interscope Records, through which it reached Eminem, who reinterpreted the lyrics of "Thank You" as written from the perspective of an obsessed fan, rather than an enamoured woman.) As early as the summer of 1998, Arista began distributing samples of the album to journalists, including the five-track The Highbury Fields EP, while some material also appeared on a promotional cassette for the 1998 Lilith Fair. Consequently, various retailers faced high demand for the album in the months preceding its release. No Angel was ultimately released on 1 June 1999, with "Here with Me" released as its lead single two weeks earlier. Dido had begun touring clubs across the US, which commenced in Boston on 10 May, and was slated to perform on five dates of the 1999 Lilith Fair in July. "Here with Me" was soon chosen as the opening theme for the American television series Roswell (1999–2002), and reached number 16 on the US Bubbling Under Hot 100, the Billboard Hot 100's extension chart. "Don't Think of Me" was released as a promotional single on 7 February 2000, before "Thank You" was released as the second single on 18 September, as Dido continued touring the US throughout the year, also serving as an opening act for Sting. She further promoted No Angel with televised performances on shows such as Live with Regis, The Tonight Show with Jay Leno, Late Show with David Letterman, Saturday Night Live, and The Late Late Show with Craig Kilborn.

As Rollo's negotiations regarding the 1999 sale of Cheeky Records to BMG postponed all Cheeky releases for over a year, No Angel was not released outside the US until 16 October 2000, when it was released in Dido's native UK. It was progressively released worldwide within the following six months. The album's release in Europe and Oceania coincided with the release of Eminem's international number-one hit single "Stan", a song which incorporates a sample of the opening verse of "Thank You", and was widely credited with propelling Dido to global prominence and accelerating the sales of No Angel. (Note: attributed to Khasim, Sheryl Garratt of The Guardian, Chris Nettleton of Drowned in Sound, and staff of ABC News) In the UK, the album was reissued as an enhanced CD on 29 January 2001, while "Here with Me" was released as the lead single on 12 February 2001, peaking at number four on the UK Singles Chart, and within the top 10 in 12 additional countries. Prior to the single's relaunch, Dido filmed a second accompanying music video for the song. Dido began touring the UK for the first time in February, followed by shows across Europe throughout the spring, before returning to North America to perform at larger venues throughout the summer. "Thank You" was internationally released on 21 May 2001, peaking at number three on both the UK Singles Chart and the US Billboard Hot 100. "Hunter" was released as the third and final single from No Angel on 18 June, attaining less commercial success than its predecessors by peaking at number 17 on the UK Singles Chart and failing to enter the US Billboard Hot 100.

Dido also promoted No Angel with televised performances in the UK, such as those of "Here with Me" and "Thank You" on Later... with Jools Holland, and separate performances of "Here with Me", "Thank You", and "Hunter" on Top of the Pops in February, June, and September 2001, respectively. In Australia, she performed "Here with Me" at the 2001 ARIA Music Awards on 30 October. Earlier that month, a double-disc special edition of the album was released in Japan and Australia, while a double-disc limited edition, including the previously unreleased "Christmas Day", was released in the UK on 19 November. "All You Want" was also released as a limited 3-inch mini single exclusively in the UK on 10 December. Although she had refused to perform at the Brit Awards 2001, where she was slated to perform "Stan" with Eminem, she performed "Here with Me" at the following ceremony on 20 February 2002.

In November 2008, No Angel was digitally reissued to include "Worthless" and a Deep Dish-produced remix of "Thank You" as bonus tracks. To commemorate the album's 20th anniversary, a six-track extended play (EP), containing remixes originally included on special and limited editions of No Angel, was made available for digital consumption on 31 May 2019. For its 25th anniversary, the album was made available on vinyl worldwide for the first time, alongside additional merchandise, on 19 September 2025. (Note: Prior to the 2025 vinyl release, No Angel was made available on vinyl through a limited-edition pressing for National Album Day, exclusively in Ireland and the UK, on 15 October 2021.)

== Critical reception ==
Professional ratings
Review scores
Source	Rating
AllMusic	4/5 stars
Drowned in Sound	4/10
Entertainment Weekly	B
The Guardian	3/5 stars
Hot Press	8/12
Los Angeles Times	3.5/4 stars
NME	5/10
Q	3/5 stars
The Rolling Stone Album Guide	3.5/5 stars
Slant Magazine	3/5 stars

On release, No Angel received generally mixed to positive reviews from music critics. American journalists, such as those of Elle, Los Angeles Times, and Time, as well as Sal Cinquemani of Slant Magazine, welcomed Dido and her "sparkling", "stylish" and "accomplished" debut. Meanwhile, British journalist Christian Ward of NME opined that Dido failed to match the strength of Eminem's "Stan", which helped introduce her to her native UK market after she had already become prominent in the US.

Jeff Burger from AllMusic and Beth Johnson of Entertainment Weekly both directed predominant praise towards the sonic quality of No Angel, which Burger described as "atmospheric, seductive, and beautifully produced and sequenced". Fridae's Ikram Khasim further called the album "an amalgamation of pop, soul, folk, and trip-hop (thanks to her brother Rollo from the band Faithless) rolled into a pleasing package", while a critic from Interview concluded that it "feels just about perfect". Conversely, Chris Nettleton of Drowned in Sound dismissed the record's sound as commercialised and overproduced, concluding that the album lacks a coherent theme. He nonetheless complimented Dido's vocal performance, as did John Aizlewood of The Guardian. Both Nettleton and Aizlewood commended the album's Faithless-influenced aspects, with Nettleton highlighting "My Lover's Gone" for exhibiting a musical style reminiscent of the band, and Aizlewood accentuating a "template of aggressive lushness" shared between the artists. Burger was, however, ambivalent towards the album's lyricism, which he labelled less adventurous than that of Sinéad O'Connor, to whom Dido received frequent critical comparisons. Ward further criticized the lyricism as "tedious", and Dido's artistry as "music for people who buy one CD a year".

Regardless of the critical polarity, Q listed No Angel as one of the best 50 albums of 2001. At the Brit Awards 2002, the album won British Album of the Year; it would go on to be nominated for British Album of 30 Years at the Brit Awards 2010, but would ultimately lose to (What's the Story) Morning Glory? by Oasis. Internationally, the album won the 2002 NRJ Music Award for International Album of the Year, in addition to being nominated for the 2001 MTV Europe Music Award for Best Album. In The New Rolling Stone Album Guide (2004), Ernesto Lechner reflected on No Angel sounding "surprisingly mature for a debut album", concluding that although Dido's "mellow approach and pretty melodies are a bit too laid-back to qualify as groundbreaking", it would be "cynical to altogether dismiss the chanteuse's sincere intentions and gorgeous voice". In a retrospective review for BBC, journalist Natalie Shaw remarked: "While there's little variation in No Angel's material, its songs do their jobs diligently. But that's exactly the problem – it's all so constructed." Writing for The Independent upon the album's 25th anniversary, journalist Adam White declared it "neither as bland as conventional wisdom suggests it is, nor quite interesting enough to be a secret classic".

== Commercial performance ==
No Angel was a universal sleeper hit. In the US, it debuted at number 50 on the Top Heatseekers chart dated 24 July 1999, after which it fluctuated for a year before reaching the summit on 5 August 2000. On the Billboard 200, the album debuted at number 144 on the issue dated 3 June 2000, and began rapidly ascending the chart in subsequent months, which was attributed to extensive touring, adult contemporary radio exposure, and Eminem's "Stan". In November, No Angel was certified platinum by the Recording Industry Association of America (RIAA), signifying shipments of one million units in the country, and entered the top 40 of the Billboard 200. In January 2001, the album leaped towards the top 10 on the Billboard 200 at number nine, by which point it had already sold two million copies in the country. The album reached its peak position of number four in its 40th week on the Billboard 200, on the chart dated 3 March 2001. On the year-end Billboard 200 for 2001, it was positioned at number 17, having been certified quadruple platinum by the RIAA that July. According to Nielsen SoundScan, No Angel had sold over 4.2 million units in the US by November 2008, and has spent a total of 69 weeks on the Billboard 200. In Canada, the album debuted at number 18 on the Canadian Albums Chart dated 6 January 2001, peaking at number four in its tenth week. For sales of 400,000 copies in the country, it was certified quadruple platinum by the Canadian Recording Industry Association (CRIA) in September 2003.

In the UK, No Angel debuted at number 50 on the UK Albums Chart dated 28 October 2000. Despite not yet being supported by a single in the country, it entered the top 10 at number five in its 14th week, ascending to the summit two weeks later, and sold over 400,000 copies in the country by February 2001. (Note: Sheryl Garratt of The Guardian reported that No Angel had sold 100,000 copies by the end of 2000, while Dave Simpson wrote for the same newspaper, as published on 29 January 2001, that the album had sold 300,000 additional units.) As "Here with Me" was commercially released as the lead single, No Angel remained atop the chart for five further consecutive weeks. On the chart dated 6 October 2001, it returned to the top for a seventh and final week. In the country, the album became the best-selling of 2001, and the second-best-selling of the 2000s, behind James Blunt's Back to Bedlam. With sales exceeding three million units, it is the 26th best-selling album of all time in the UK, and was certified decuple platinum by the British Phonographic Industry (BPI) in July 2013. Across Europe, the album reached number one in Austria, Finland, France, Greece, Ireland, and Norway, as well as on the European Top 100 Albums. It was the best-selling album of 2001 in Europe, and the second-best-selling in Finland, Germany, and Ireland. The following year, it was certified quintuple platinum by the International Federation of the Phonographic Industry (IFPI), for sales of five million units in Europe.

In Australia, No Angel debuted at number 21, rising to number one in its sixth week and spending eight consecutive weeks at the summit. It went on to be certified sextuple platinum by the Australian Recording Industry Association (ARIA) in 2004, denoting shipments of over 420,000 units in the country. In New Zealand, the album debuted at number 17, reaching the summit in its fifth week; it stayed atop the chart for nine non-consecutive weeks. By April 2002, it had sold 75,000 copies and was certified quintuple platinum by the Recording Industry Association of New Zealand (RIANZ). No Angel was the second-best-selling album of 2001 in both countries. With shipments of 8.6 million copies worldwide, it topped Billboard's Global 20 chart for 2001. According to the International Federation of the Phonographic Industry (IFPI), the album was the second-best-selling of 2001 worldwide. As of 2025, it has sold an estimated 15 million copies worldwide.

== Track listing ==
No Angel
No.	Title	Writer(s)	Producer(s)	Length
1.	"Here with Me"	Dido Armstrong; Paul Statham; Pascal Gabriel	Dido; Rick Nowels	4:14
2.	"Hunter"	D. Armstrong; Rollo Armstrong	Dido; Nowels	3:57
3.	"Don't Think of Me"	D. Armstrong; R. Armstrong; Paul Herman; Pauline Taylor	Youth	4:32
4.	"My Lover's Gone"	D. Armstrong; Jamie Catto	Dido; Catto; Duncan Bridgeman	4:27
5.	"All You Want"	D. Armstrong; Herman; R. Armstrong	Dido; Nowels	3:53
6.	"Thank You"	D. Armstrong; Herman	Dido; Rollo	3:38
7.	"Honestly OK"	D. Armstrong; R. Armstrong; Matty Benbrook	Dido; Rollo	4:37
8.	"Slide"	D. Armstrong; Herman	Dido; Rollo	4:53
9.	"Isobel"	D. Armstrong; R. Armstrong	Dido; Rollo	3:54
10.	"I'm No Angel"	D. Armstrong; Statham; Gabriel	Dido; Rollo	3:55
11.	"My Life"	D. Armstrong; R. Armstrong; Mark Bates	Dido; Rollo	3:09
12.	"Take My Hand" (bonus track)	D. Armstrong; Richard Dekkard	Dido; Rollo; Sister Bliss	6:42
Total length:				51:51

Japanese edition
No.	Title	Writer(s)	Producer(s)	Length
13.	"Worthless"	D. Armstrong; R. Armstrong; Ayalah Bentovim	Dido; Rollo; Sister Bliss	7:52
14.	"Me"	D. Armstrong; R. Armstrong; Catto	Dido; Rollo	2:38

=== Notes ===
- "Thank You" is stylized as "Thankyou" on physical pressings.
- UK special edition pressings include the music videos for "Here with Me" and "Thank You", as does the first disc of the UK limited edition.
- Digital reissue includes "Worthless" and Deep Dish vocal mix of "Thank You".
- International special edition pressings include a bonus disc containing Deep Dish vocal and Skinny mixes of "Thank You", Chillin' with the Family and Lukas Burton mixes of "Here with Me", and the Francois K mix of "Hunter".
- UK limited edition pressings include a bonus disc containing the Lukas Burton mix of "Here with Me", Deep Dish vocal mix of "Thank You", MJ Cole remix of and music video for "Hunter", Rollo & Sister Bliss remix of "Take My Hand", "Christmas Day", (Note: written and produced by Dido and Rollo Armstrong) and live videos of "All You Want" and "Honestly OK".

== Personnel ==
Credits are adapted from the liner notes of No Angel.

- Dido – keyboards (tracks 7 and 9), production (tracks 1, 2, and 4–12), recorder (track 6), songwriting (all tracks), vocals (all tracks)
- Bruce Aisher – additional keyboards (track 7), keyboards (track 8)
- Rusty Anderson – electric guitar (tracks 2 and 5)
- Aquila – background vocals (track 8)
- Mark Bates – keyboards (tracks 6, 11, and 12), organ (track 11), piano (tracks 3, 6, 9, and 11), songwriting (track 11), Wurlitzer (track 11)
- Matty Benbrook – live drums (tracks 8, 9, and 11), programming (track 7), songwriting (track 7)
- Duncan Bridgeman – keyboards (track 4), production (track 4), programming (track 4), recording (track 4)
- Phill Brown – mixing (tracks 6–11), recording (tracks 9 and 10)
- Rachael Brown – background vocals (tracks 8 and 11)
- Jamie Catto – production (track 4), songwriting (track 4)
- Tom Coyne – mastering
- Laura de Leon – hair
- Richard Dekkard – songwriting (track 12)
- Geoff Dugmore – live drums (track 3), percussion (track 3)
- Peter Edge – A&R
- Mark Felton – harmonica (track 10)
- Pascal Gabriel – songwriting (tracks 1 and 10)
- Goetz – additional recording (track 9), mixing (tracks 4 and 12), recording (tracks 6–8, 11, and 12)
- Hosh Gureli – A&R
- Paulie Herman – guitar (tracks 3, 6, 8, and 9), harmonica (track 9), songwriting (3, 5, 6, and 8)
- Ash Howes – mixing (tracks 1, 2, and 5), recording (tracks 1, 2, and 5)
- Len Irish – photography
- Sudha Kheterpal – percussion (tracks 8 and 10)
- Peter Leak – management
- Heidi Lee – makeup
- Sheri G. Lee – art direction
- Wil Malone – string arrangement (tracks 1, 3, 11, and 12)
- Martin McCorry – electric guitar (track 9)
- Hugo Nicolson – mixing (track 3), recording (track 3)
- Rick Nowels – acoustic guitar (tracks 1, 2, and 5), chamberlin (tracks 2 and 5), keyboards (tracks 1, 2, and 5), production (tracks 1, 2, and 5)
- Aubrey Nunn – bass guitar (tracks 4, 8, 10, and 12)
- John Pierce – bass (tracks 2 and 5)
- Dave Randall – guitar (tracks 4, 10, and 12)
- Nick "Manasseh" Raphael – additional programming (track 7), dub effects (track 7)
- Jony Rockstar – programming (track 3)
- Rollo – production (tracks 6–12), programming (tracks 6, 8–10, and 12), songwriting (tracks 2, 3, 5, 7, 9, and 11)
- James Sanger – programming (tracks 1, 2, and 5)
- Sister Bliss – keyboards (track 12), production (track 12)
- Mal Hyde Smith – percussion (tracks 6, 9, and 12)
- Andrew Southam – photography
- Paul Statham – keyboards (tracks 1 and 10), piano (track 10), songwriting (tracks 1 and 10)
- Richie Stevens – additional live drums (tracks 2 and 5), additional percussion (track 5)
- Pauline Taylor – additional arrangement (track 8), additional background vocals (tracks 2, 3, and 12), background vocals (tracks 8 and 11), background vocal arrangement (track 11), songwriting (track 3)
- John Themis – electric guitar (tracks 1, 2, and 5), percussion (tracks 1, 2, and 5)
- Peter Vittese – additional programming (track 1), keyboards (track 1)
- Tim Vogt – bass (track 9)
- Randy Wine – engineering (tracks 2 and 5)
- Gavyn Wright – strings (tracks 1, 3, 11, and 12)
- Youth – bass (track 3), production (track 3)
- Basia Zamorska – styling

== Charts ==
=== Weekly charts ===
2000–2001 weekly chart performance
Chart	Peak position
Australian Albums (ARIA)	1
Austrian Albums (Ö3 Austria)	1
Belgian Albums (Ultratop Flanders)	3
Belgian Albums (Ultratop Wallonia)	8
Canadian Albums (Billboard)	4
Danish Albums (Hitlisten)	2
Dutch Albums (Album Top 100)	3
European Top 100 Albums (Music & Media)	1
Finnish Albums (Suomen virallinen lista)	1
French Albums (SNEP)	1
German Albums (Offizielle Top 100)	2
Greek Albums (IFPI)	1
Hungarian Albums (MAHASZ)	16
Irish Albums (IRMA)	1
Italian Albums (FIMI)	4
Japanese Albums (Oricon)	43
New Zealand Albums (RMNZ)	1
Norwegian Albums (VG-lista)	1
Polish Albums (ZPAV)	4
Portuguese Albums (AFP)	2
Scottish Albums (Official Charts)	1
Slovak Albums (IFPI)	6
South African Albums (RISA)	10
Spanish Albums (PROMUSICAE)	6
Swedish Albums (Sverigetopplistan)	2
Swiss Albums (Schweizer Hitparade)	2
UK Albums (Official Charts)	1
US Billboard 200	4

2025 weekly chart performance
Chart	Peak position
German Pop Albums (Offizielle Top 100)	12
UK Physical Albums (OCC)	15
UK Vinyl Albums (OCC)	7

=== Monthly charts ===
2001 monthly chart performance
Chart	Peak position
Argentine Albums (CAPIF)	1

=== Year-end charts ===
2000 year-end chart performance
Chart	Position
Canadian Albums (Nielsen SoundScan)	81
UK Albums (OCC)	135
US Billboard 200	175

2001 year-end chart performance
Chart	Position
Argentine Albums (CAPIF)	16
Australian Albums (ARIA)	2
Austrian Albums (Ö3 Austria)	9
Belgian Albums (Ultratop Flanders)	11
Belgian Alternative Albums (Ultratop Flanders)	5
Belgian Albums (Ultratop Wallonia)	13
Canadian Albums (Nielsen SoundScan)	16
Danish Albums (Hitlisten)	5
Dutch Albums (Album Top 100)	12
European Top 100 Albums (Music & Media)	1
Finnish Albums (Suomen virallinen lista)	2
French Albums (SNEP)	3
German Albums (Offizielle Top 100)	2
Global 20 (Billboard)	1
Irish Albums (IRMA)	2
Italian Albums (FIMI)	7
New Zealand Albums (RMNZ)	2
Spanish Albums (AFYVE)	38
Swedish Albums (Sverigetopplistan)	15
Swiss Albums (Schweizer Hitparade)	4
UK Albums (OCC)	1
US Billboard 200	17
Worldwide Albums (IFPI)	2

2002 year-end chart performance
Chart	Position
Australian Albums (ARIA)	43
Belgian Albums (Ultratop Flanders)	70
Belgian Alternative Albums (Ultratop Flanders)	32
Belgian Albums (Ultratop Wallonia)	57
Canadian Alternative Albums (Nielsen SoundScan)	75
European Top 100 Albums (Music & Media)	24
French Albums (SNEP)	38
UK Albums (OCC)	27

2003 year-end chart performance
Chart	Position
Belgian Albums (Ultratop Flanders)	98
UK Albums (OCC)	89

2004 year-end chart performance
Chart	Position
Belgian Midprice Albums (Ultratop Flanders)	10
Belgian Midprice Albums (Ultratop Wallonia)	11
UK Albums (OCC)	98

2005 year-end chart performance
Chart	Position
Belgian Midprice Albums (Ultratop Flanders)	44

=== Decade-end charts ===
2000s decade-end chart performance
Chart	Position
Australian Albums (ARIA)	24
UK Albums (OCC)	2
US Billboard 200	97

== Certifications ==
Certifications and sales
Region	Certification	Certified units/sales
Argentina (CAPIF)	Platinum	60,000^{^}
Australia (ARIA)	6× Platinum	420,000^{^}
Austria (IFPI Austria)	Platinum	50,000^{*}
Belgium (BRMA)	3× Platinum	150,000^{*}
Brazil (Pro-Música Brasil)	2× Platinum	250,000^{*}
Canada (Music Canada)	4× Platinum	400,000^{^}
Chile (IFPI Chile)	Gold	15,000
Croatia (HDU)	Silver	
Denmark (IFPI Danmark)	Platinum	50,000^{^}
Finland (Musiikkituottajat)	Platinum	50,514
France (SNEP)	Diamond	1,000,000^{*}
Germany (BVMI)	3× Gold	750,000^{^}
Greece (IFPI Greece)	Gold	15,000^{^}
Italy	—	258,000
Japan (RIAJ)	Gold	100,000^{^}
Mexico (AMPROFON)	Platinum	150,000^{^}
Netherlands (NVPI)	Platinum	100,000^{^}
New Zealand (RMNZ)	5× Platinum	75,000^{^}
Norway (IFPI Norway)	Platinum	50,000^{*}
Poland (ZPAV)	Platinum	40,000^{*}
South Africa (RISA)	3× Platinum	150,000^{*}
Spain (Promusicae)	Gold	100,000
Sweden (GLF)	Platinum	80,000^{^}
Switzerland (IFPI Switzerland)	3× Platinum	150,000^{^}
United Kingdom (BPI)	10× Platinum	3,096,728
United States (RIAA)	4× Platinum	4,200,000
Summaries
Europe (IFPI)	5× Platinum	5,000,000^{*}
Worldwide	—	15,000,000
^{*} Sales figures based on certification alone.^{^} Shipments figures based on certification alone.

== Release history ==
Release dates and formats
Region	Date	Edition(s)	Format(s)	Label(s)	Ref.
United States	1 June 1999	Standard	Cassette; CD	Arista; Cheeky	
United Kingdom	16 October 2000	Standard	Cassette; CD	Arista	
Germany	23 October 2000	Standard	CD	BMG	
France	22 January 2001	Standard	CD	BMG	
United Kingdom	29 January 2001	Special	Enhanced CD	Arista	
Argentina	1 February 2001	Standard	CD	BMG	
Australia	12 February 2001	Standard	CD	BMG	
Japan	25 April 2001	Standard	CD	BMG	
Japan	3 October 2001	Special	Double CD	BMG	
Australia	15 October 2001	Special	Double CD	BMG	
United Kingdom	19 November 2001	Limited	Double enhanced CD	Arista	
Various	28 November 2008	Reissue	Digital download	Sony	
Various	19 September 2025	Standard	Vinyl	Sony	

== See also ==
- Dido discography
- List of UK Albums Chart number ones of the 2000s
- List of number-one albums of 2001 (Australia)
- List of best-selling albums
- List of best-selling albums by women
- List of best-selling albums in Europe
- List of best-selling albums in France
- List of best-selling albums in United Kingdom
- List of best-selling albums of the 2000s (decade) in the United Kingdom
