= Take My Hand (Dido song) =

1995 song by Dido Armstrong and Richard Dekkard

Song by Dido

from the album No Angel
- Released: 1 June 1999
- Studio: Swanyard Studios (London, England); The Church Studios (London, England); Olympic Studios (London, England)
- Length: 6:48
- Label: Arista, Cheeky
- Songwriters: Dido Armstrong, Richard Dekkard
- Producers: Dido, Rollo, Sister Bliss

"Take My Hand" is a song written by Dido Armstrong and Richard Dekkard that appears as the closing track on Dido's 1999 debut album, No Angel. Despite not being released as a single from the album, "Take My Hand" reached number one on the US Billboard Dance Club Play chart in 2002. According to Dido, it was one of the first songs she wrote after starting her sex life.

== Charts ==
=== Weekly charts ===
Chart (2002)	Peak position
US Dance Club Songs (Billboard)	1

=== Year-end charts ===
Chart (2002)	Position
US Dance Club Play (Billboard)	24

== Jurgen Vries version ==
"Take My Hand"

Single by Jurgen Vries featuring Andrea Britton
- Released: 7 June 2004
- Length: 3:04
- Label: Direction
- Songwriters: Dido Armstrong, Richard Dekkard
- Producer: Darren Tate

Jurgen Vries singles chronology
"Wilderness" (2003)	"Take My Hand" (2004)

In June 2004, "Take My Hand" was covered by DJ Darren Tate under his Jurgen Vries guise, and it reached number 23 on the UK Singles Chart. The vocals on this track were performed by Andrea Britton.

=== Track listing ===
Catalogue Number – 674993 2
No.	Title	Length
1.	"Take My Hand" (radio edit)	3:19
2.	"Deliverance" (12-inch edit)	5:13
3.	"Take My Hand" (12-inch vocal CD edit)	6:00
4.	"Take My Hand" (Piece Process remix 12-inch edit)	5:22

== See also ==
- List of number-one dance singles of 2002 (U.S.)
