= Feelin' Good (Faithless song) =

Single by Faithless featuring Dido

from the album The Dance
- Released: 29 August 2010
- Recorded: 2010
- Length: 3:16
- Label: Nates Tunes
- Songwriter(s): Rollo Armstrong, Maxwell Fraser, Dido Armstrong

Faithless singles chronology
"Tweak Your Nipple" (2010)	"Feelin' Good" (2010)

Dido singles chronology
"It Comes and It Goes" (2009)	"Feelin' Good" (2010)	"Everything to Lose" (2010)

"Feelin' Good" is a song by Faithless, from their sixth studio album The Dance (2010). The song was released in the United Kingdom as a digital download on 29 August 2010. The song features Rollo's sister Dido on vocals. The song peaked at number 125 on the UK Singles Chart.

== Track listing ==
Digital download
No.	Title	Length
1.	"Feelin' Good" (feat. Dido) (Radio Edit)	3:16

== Chart performance ==
Chart (2010)	Peak position
UK Singles (Official Charts Company)	125

== Release history ==
Region	Date	Format	Label
United Kingdom	29 August 2010	Digital Download	Nates Tunes
