= Rick Nowels =

American songwriter and record producer

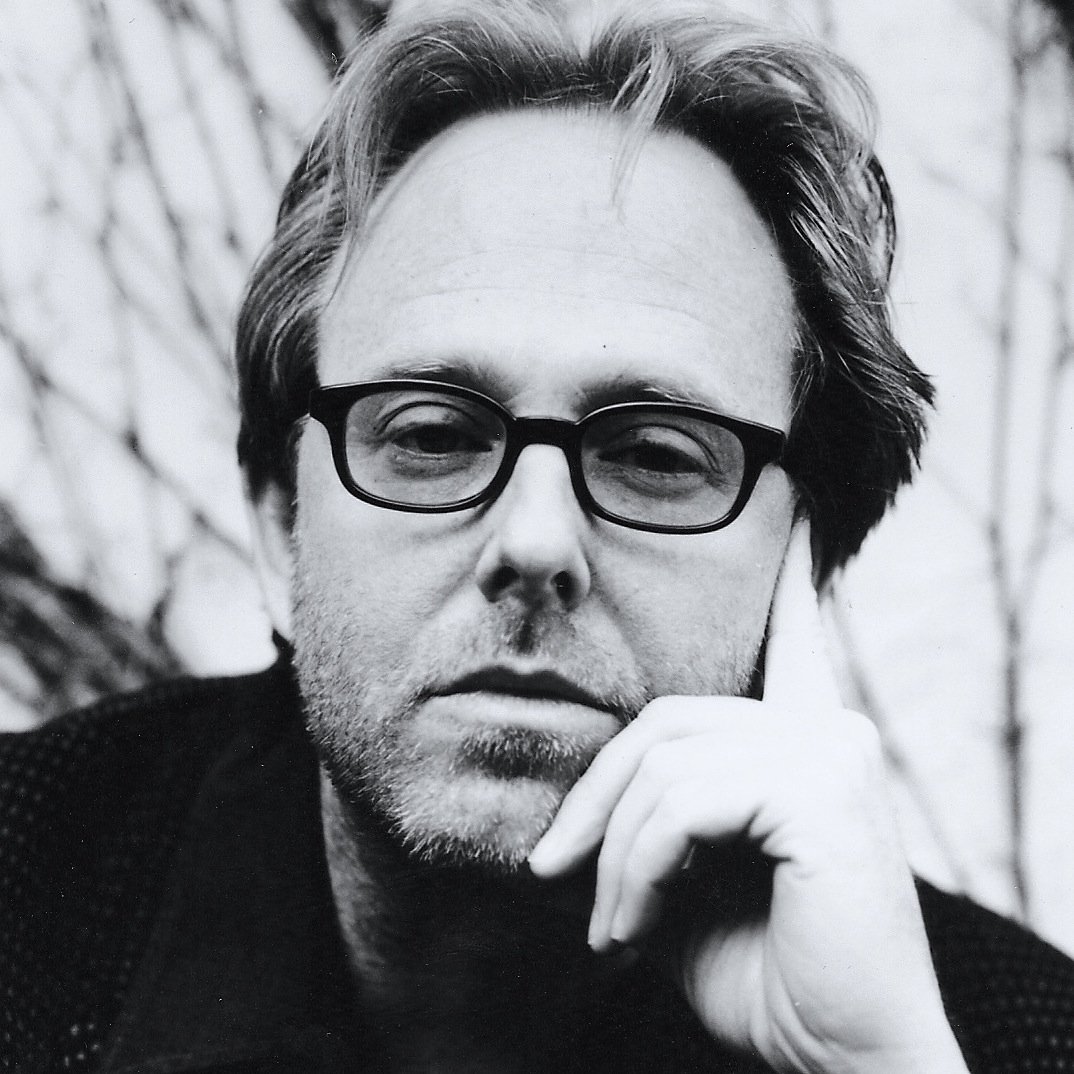

Background information
- Born: Richard Wright Nowels Jr. March 16, 1960 (age 66); San Francisco, California, U.S.
- Origin: Palo Alto, California, U.S.
- Genres: Pop; dream pop; alternative rock; dance; soul
- Occupations: Record producer; songwriter
- Years active: 1985–present
- Label: Virgin
- Website: ricknowels.com

Richard Wright Nowels Jr. (born March 16, 1960) is an American songwriter and record producer from Palo Alto, California. He has co-written and co-produced over 90 hit singles with multiple artists, and albums his songs have appeared on have sold over 250 million copies. His songwriting credits include Belinda Carlisle's "Heaven Is a Place on Earth", Stevie Nicks’s "Rooms on Fire", and Madonna's "The Power of Goodbye". He has also collaborated heavily with Lana Del Rey, co-writing songs including "Summertime Sadness" and "Young and Beautiful". In 2020, he was inducted into the Songwriters Hall of Fame.

== Career ==
In 1985, Stevie Nicks co-wrote "I Can't Wait" with Nowels and recorded the song in Los Angeles, giving Nowels his first major songwriting and production credit. He was later asked to co-produce Nicks' album Rock a Little alongside Jimmy Iovine. The album was released in November 1985 and featured five songs produced by Nowels and one co-written by him ("If I Were You"). "I Can't Wait" peaked at number sixteen for two weeks on the Billboard Hot 100 chart and is one of only four of Nicks' singles to enter the Dance Club Songs chart.

In 1987, Nowels produced Belinda Carlisle's album Heaven on Earth. The album also featured four songs written or co-written by Nowels, including "Heaven Is a Place on Earth" and "Circle in the Sand", which went to number one and number seven, respectively, on the Billboard Hot 100 chart. Nowels co-wrote with Ellen Shipley on that album and on other projects. In 1989, Nowels produced Carlisle's third album, Runaway Horses. Nowels wrote six of the ten songs, including "Leave a Light On", which went to number eleven on the Billboard Hot 100 chart and to number four in the UK.

Nowels co-wrote the title track from Celine Dion's album Falling into You, which won the Grammy Award for Album of the Year in 1997.

Nowels co-wrote and co-produced the hit single "The Game of Love", performed by Santana and Michelle Branch, which won ASCAP Song of the Year in 2004. He also co-wrote the global hit single "White Flag" for Dido, which won the 2004 Ivor Novello Award for International Hit of the Year.

In 2013, Nowels collaborated with Adele on the song "Why Do You Love Me?", released as part of the deluxe version of her album 25. Nowels co-wrote and co-produced the hit single "Out of Love" with Alessia Cara from her sophomore album, The Pains of Growing. In collaboration with R&B singer-songwriter Miguel, Nowels co-wrote the hit single "Lost in Your Light" for Dua Lipa's self-titled debut album. Nowels has been a longtime collaborator of Swedish singer-songwriter Lykke Li. He has co-written songs on 3 of her albums—Wounded Rhymes, I Never Learn, and So Sad So Sexy—including the international hit single "I Follow Rivers", written with Lykke Li and her producer Björn Yttling. Nowels co-wrote the hit single "Loud Places" from In Colour, the solo debut album of Jamie xx.

In 2016, Nowels co-wrote and co-produced the British artist FKA Twigs' single, "Good to Love". The same year, Nowels co-wrote five songs for Tom Odell's third album, Wrong Crowd, along with the hit single, "Magnetized". In 2021, Odell released "Monster", the title track for his fourth album, which was co-written with Nowels.

=== Madonna ===
While Nowels was in New York for the Grammy Awards in 1997, he met Madonna during a shopping expedition at Barneys. She later booked two weeks worth of writing time with Nowels in his Hollywood Hills studio. Together, they wrote "The Power of Good-Bye", "Little Star" and "To Have and Not to Hold", all featured on Madonna's seventh studio album, Ray of Light.

Ray of Light won Best Pop Album at the 1999 Grammy Awards, where Madonna thanked Nowels from the stage during her acceptance speech. The album also won Best Recording Package, Best Dance Recording, and Best Short Form Music Video.

In 2014, Nowels and Madonna collaborated again on a song, "Beautiful Scars", from her thirteenth studio album, Rebel Heart.

=== Dido ===
Nowels met Dido in 1999 during the recording sessions for her debut album, No Angel, under Cheeky Records, an independent label in London. Nowels co-produced three songs on the album, including "Here with Me", "Hunter" and "All You Want", all which were released as singles to promote the album. "Here with Me" became Dido's debut single as an artist, peaking at number four on the UK Singles Chart. No Angel went on to sell 15 million copies worldwide.

In 2002, Nowels and Dido collaborated again to produce her second album Life for Rent. Nowels wrote five songs featured on the album, including singles "White Flag" and "Sand in My Shoes". The album became the seventh best-selling album of the 2000s in the UK, was nominated for a Grammy, won the award for "Best Single" at the 2004 Brit Awards, won "International Hit of the Year" at the 2004 Ivor Novello Awards, and other accolades.

The pair went on to collaborate on Dido's Safe Trip Home album in 2008, her Girl Who Got Away album in 2013, and her 2019 album Still on My Mind.

In an interview with Songwriter Universe in 2015, Nowels discussed working with her: " I met Dido when she was unknown, making her debut album on an indie label in the U.K. It was all very humble…writing in her little flat and her making tea for me. She’s a very smart songwriter and distills everything down to its simple essence. She has Irish roots and writes beautiful, simple folk melodies…right up my alley. I ended up producing on the first album and we had a hit with “Here With Me”. Her album (No Angel) ended up selling 12 million records! On the next album (Life for Rent) I co-wrote five songs. “White Flag” was a huge international hit. We had another single called “Sand In My Shoes”—I always felt that was a big hit, but it didn’t really make it. That album also sold 12 million. Dido sold 25 million records over a four-year period."

=== Lana Del Rey ===
Nowels met Lana Del Rey in the spring of 2011 and has collaborated with her on multiple albums since.

In a three-day writing session they composed "Summertime Sadness", "Dark Paradise", "Lucky Ones", and "TV in Black & White". The first three songs were released on Del Rey's 2012 Born to Die album, peaking at number one in the UK in 2012. The album sold 77,000 copies in the US within the first week and peaked at number two on the Billboard 200, just behind Adele's album, 21. It received gold certification in 2013 and became the fifth best-selling album of 2012, selling 3.4 million copies.

In November 2012, Del Rey released the Paradise Edition of the Born to Die album with three new songs written and produced by Nowels and Del Rey—"Body Electric", "American" and "Cola".

In 2013, Nowels and Del Rey's song, "Young and Beautiful", was featured in Baz Luhrmann's film, The Great Gatsby. The song was featured throughout the film and incorporated into the score by Craig Armstrong. "Young and Beautiful" was released in April 2013. By June 2013 it rose to number three on the chart and has sold over a million copies since its release.

In 2015, Del Rey released her fourth studio album, Honeymoon. The entire album was co-written by Del Rey and Nowels with the exception of the cover, "Don't Let Me Be Misunderstood". Del Rey and Nowels' singles include "High by the Beach", as well as "Music to Watch Boys To". Honeymoon debuted at number two on the Billboard 200 and reached number one in Australia, Greece, Ireland, and number two in the UK.

In 2017, Del Rey released her fifth studio album, Lust for Life. Del Rey and Nowels co-wrote 14 of the songs for the album including the 3 singles, "Love", "Lust for Life" (featuring the Weeknd), and "White Mustang". The album was nominated for a Grammy Award for Best Pop Vocal Album. It debuted at number one on the US Billboard 200, as well as the UK Albums Chart.

=== Dua Lipa ===
Nowels co-wrote "Lost in Your Light", recorded by Dua Lipa featuring Miguel, which was released on 21 April 2017 as the sixth single from the former's self-titled debut studio album.

=== Kim Wilde ===
Nowels first met Kim Wilde in 1991 after hearing her 1981 album "Kids in America" and quickly became a fan. When he went out to Knebworth to meet them, which is where they co-wrote the album "Love Is", he produced three of the eleven songs: "A Miracle's Coming", "I Won't Change the Way that I Feel", and "Love is Holy", which was released as the lead in the album in 1992. The album peaked at number 21 on the UK albums chart.

== Discography ==
=== Notable works ===
- "Body and Soul" by Anita Baker
- "I Turn to You" by Melanie C
- "Northern Star" by Melanie C
- "Fallin' for You" by Colbie Caillat
- "Out of Love" by Alessia Cara
- "Circle in the Sand" by Belinda Carlisle
- "Do You Feel Like I Feel?" by Belinda Carlisle
- "Heaven Is a Place on Earth" by Belinda Carlisle
- "In Too Deep" by Belinda Carlisle
- "La Luna" by Belinda Carlisle
- "Leave a Light On" by Belinda Carlisle
- "Live Your Life Be Free" by Belinda Carlisle
- "Runaway Horses" by Belinda Carlisle
- "(We Want) The Same Thing" by Belinda Carlisle
- "Art Deco" by Lana Del Rey
- "Heroin" by Lana Del Rey
- "High by the Beach" by Lana Del Rey
- "Summertime Sadness" by Lana Del Rey
- "West Coast" by Lana Del Rey
- "Young and Beautiful" by Lana Del Rey
- "Here with Me" by Dido
- "Hunter" by Dido
- "Sand in My Shoes" by Dido
- "Take You Home" by Dido
- "White Flag" by Dido
- "Falling into You" by Celine Dion
- "Everybody Finds Out" by Fleetwood Mac
- "In God's Hands" by Nelly Furtado
- "Cry Baby" by CeeLo Green
- "Scream If You Wanna Go Faster" by Geri Halliwell
- "Standing Still" by Jewel
- "This Way" by Jewel
- "Hunt You Down" by Kesha
- "Green Light" by John Legend
- "I Follow Rivers" by Lykke Li
- "Silver Line" by Lykke Li
- "Lost in Your Light" by Dua Lipa
- "Little Star" by Madonna
- "The Power of Good-Bye" by Madonna
- "To Have and Not to Hold" by Madonna
- "Bubblegum Bitch" by Marina and the Diamonds
- "The World as I See It" by Jason Mraz
- "You Get What You Give" by New Radicals
- "I Can't Wait" by Stevie Nicks
- "Long Way to Go" by Stevie Nicks
- "Rooms on Fire" by Stevie Nicks
- "Thinking of You (I Drive Myself Crazy)" by NSYNC
- "Magnetized" by Tom Odell
- "Wrong Crowd" by Tom Odell
- "The Game of Love" by Santana
- "To Be Human" by Sia
- "Love is Holy" by Kim Wilde
- "Loud Places" by Jamie xx

== Personal life ==
Nowels married singer-songwriter Maria Vidal in 1990. Vidal attended New York University and wrote the dance song, "Body Rock", which charted on the Billboard Hot 100 chart. The couple has a son, Tommy, born in 1993. Nowels is a supporter of TreePeople Los Angeles, The Sierra Club, and the Natural Resources Defense Council (NRDC).

== Awards and nominations ==
Year	Nominated work	Category	Result	Notes
2014	"Young and Beautiful" by Lana Del Rey	Satellite Award for Best Original Song	Won	Co-writer
2004	White Flag	Ivor Novello Award for International Hit of the Year	Won	Co-writer

=== ASCAP Pop Music Awards ===
Year	Nominated work	Category	Result	Notes
2004	"The Game of Love" by Santana ft. Michelle Branch	Song of the Year	Won	Co-writer

=== Grammy Awards ===
Year	Nominee / work	Award	Result	Ref.
2013	"Young and Beautiful"	Best Song Written for Visual Media	Nominated	
2003	"Love One Another"	Best Dance Recording	Nominated	
1997	Falling into You	Album of the Year	Won	
1994	"Body and Soul"	Best R&B Song	Nominated	
