= Don't Think of Me =

2000 single by Dido

Promotional single by Dido

from the album No Angel
- Released: 7 February 2000
- Length: 4:32
- Label: Arista; Cheeky
- Songwriters: Dido Armstrong; Rollo Armstrong; Pauline Taylor; Paul Herman
- Producer: Youth

Audio
- "Don't Think of Me" on YouTube

"Don't Think of Me" is a song recorded by English singer-songwriter Dido for her debut studio album No Angel (1999). It was written by Dido, Rollo Armstrong, Pauline Taylor, and Paul Herman, while being produced by Youth. The song was released as a promotional single on 7 February 2000 by Arista Records and Cheeky Records, peaking at number 35 on the US Billboard Adult Top 40. In 2002, the song charted in Romania, peaking at number 62.

== Credits and personnel ==
Credits are lifted from the US promo CD and the No Angel album booklet.

Studio

- Mastered at Sterling Sound (New York City)

Personnel

- Dido – writing (as Dido Armstrong), all vocals
- Rollo Armstrong – writing
- Pauline Taylor – writing, additional background vocals
- Paul Herman – writing, guitar
- Youth – bass, production
- Mark Bates – piano
- Geoff Dugmore – live drums and percussion
- Wil Malone – string arrangement
- Gavyn Wright – string leader
- Jony Rockstar – programming
- Hugo Nicolson – recording, mixing (album version)
- Tom Lord-Alge – mixing (radio mix)
- Tom Coyne – mastering
- Sheri G. Lee – art direction
- Andrew Southam – photography
- Len Irish – interior photography
- Basia Zamorska – styling
- Laura De Leon – hair
- Heidi Lee – makeup

== Charts ==
Chart (2000–2002)	Peak position
Romania (Romanian Top 100)	62
US Adult Pop Airplay (Billboard)	35
