= Hunter (Dido song) =

2001 single by Dido

Single by Dido

from the album No Angel
- Released: 18 June 2001
- Length: 3:57
- Label: Arista; BMG; Cheeky
- Songwriters: Dido Armstrong; Rollo Armstrong
- Producers: Dido; Rick Nowels

Dido singles chronology
"Stan" (2000)	"Hunter" (2001)	"One Step Too Far" (2002)

Music video
- "Hunter" on YouTube

"Hunter" is a song by British singer Dido from her debut album, No Angel (1999). The song was released as the third single from the album in the United States on 18 June 2001. "Hunter" reached number 17 on the UK Singles Chart and peaked within the top 50 in Australia, France, Greece, Ireland, and New Zealand. In the US, it entered the top 20 on two Billboard charts.

== Music video ==
The video, directed by Matthew Rolston, takes place in the city during a night of the full moon. In the video, Dido is chasing her doppelgänger in the city. Intercut are scenes of Dido singing the song in a balcony, living room and also the underwater amusement park. The video ends with Dido catching up with her lookalike in a tunnel and both hugging and embracing each other.

== Track listings ==
UK CD1

1. "Hunter" – 3:54
2. "Hunter" (MJ Cole remix) – 6:07
3. "Take My Hand" (Rollo & Sister Bliss remix) – 8:03

UK CD2

1. "Hunter" – 3:54
2. "Hunter" (FK-EK vocal mix) – 7:04
3. "Take My Hand" (Brothers in Rhythm remix) – 8:50

UK 12-inch single

A. "Hunter" (MJ Cole remix) – 6:07
B. "Take My Hand" (Rollo & Sister Bliss remix) – 8:03

Australian CD single

1. "Hunter" – 3:56
2. "Hunter" (FK-EK vocal mix) – 7:04
3. "Take My Hand" (Rollo & Sister Bliss remix) – 8:03

== Personnel ==
Personnel are lifted from the UK CD1 liner notes.

- Dido – writing (as Dido Armstrong), vocals, production
- Rollo Armstrong – writing
- Pauline Taylor – additional background vocals
- Rick Nowels – keyboards, acoustic guitar, Wurlitzer, Chamberlin, production
- John Themis – electric guitar, percussion
- Rusty Anderson – electric guitar
- John Pierce – bass
- Richie Stevens – additional live drums
- Ash Howes – recording, mixing
- Randy Wine – additional recording
- James Sanger – programming
- Richard Andrews – artwork design
- Ellen von Unwerth – photography

== Charts ==
=== Weekly charts ===
Chart (2001)	Peak position
Australia (ARIA)	50
Belgium (Ultratip Bubbling Under Flanders)	7
Belgium (Ultratip Bubbling Under Wallonia)	4
Croatia (HRT)	9
Europe (Eurochart Hot 100)	63
France (SNEP)	45
Greece (IFPI)	10
Ireland (IRMA)	48
Netherlands (Dutch Top 40 Tipparade)	1
Netherlands (Single Top 100)	73
New Zealand (Recorded Music NZ)	28
Poland Airplay (Music & Media)	1
Poland (Polish Airplay Charts)	2
Scottish Singles Sales (Official Charts)	17
Switzerland (Schweizer Hitparade)	59
UK Singles (Official Charts)	17
US Adult Pop Airplay (Billboard)	16
US Dance Club Songs (Billboard)	9

=== Year-end charts ===
Chart (2001)	Position
US Adult Top 40 (Billboard)	51

== Release history ==
Region	Date	Format(s)	Label(s)	Ref.
United States	18 June 2001	Hot adult contemporary; triple A radio	Arista; Cheeky	
United States	14 August 2001	Contemporary hit radio	Arista; Cheeky	
Denmark	10 September 2001	CD	Arista; BMG; Cheeky	
Sweden	10 September 2001	CD	Arista; BMG; Cheeky	
United Kingdom	10 September 2001	12-inch vinyl; CD	Arista; BMG; Cheeky	
Australia	3 December 2001	CD	Arista; BMG; Cheeky	
