= Everything to Lose =

Single by Dido

from the album Sex and the City 2: Original Motion Picture Soundtrack
- Released: 7 September 2010
- Genre: Trance; house
- Length: 4:28
- Label: Sony
- Songwriter(s): Dido Armstrong; Rollo Armstrong; Ayalah Bentovim
- Producer(s): Dido; Rollo; Sister Bliss

Dido singles chronology
"Feelin' Good" (2010)	"Everything to Lose" (2010)	"No Freedom" (2013)

"Everything to Lose" is a song released by British singer Dido, as the only single taken from the soundtrack of the motion picture Sex and the City 2 and premiered on Dido's official YouTube channel on 9 May 2010. The song was premiered on radio stations on 4 June 2010. It was officially released as a digital download in the United Kingdom on 7 September 2010, alongside remixes by Armin van Buuren, ATFC and Fred Falke. The song peaked at number 16 on the Italian Singles Chart, number 58 on the Japan Hot 100 and number 84 on the ARIA Singles Chart. No physical CD single was released, and the track wasn't included on her fourth album.

== Track listing ==
Digital download

1. "Everything to Lose" (Armin van Buuren Remix) – 7:58
2. "Everything to Lose" (ATFC Remix) – 8:29
3. "Everything to Lose" (ATFC Dub) – 6:44
4. "Everything to Lose" (Fred Falke Extended Vocal Remix) – 7:48
5. "Everything to Lose" (Fred Falke Dub) – 7:51

== Charts ==
Chart (2010)	Peak position
Italian Singles Chart	16
Japan Hot 100	58
