= Give You Up =

Single by Dido

from the album Still on My Mind
- Released: 22 January 2019
- Studio: RAK Studios (London, England)
- Length: 3:21
- Label: BMG
- Songwriter(s): Si Hulbert; Dee Adam; Denny Thakrar; Rob Agostini
- Producer(s): Si Hulbert; Dee Adam

Dido singles chronology
"End of Night" (2013)	"Give You Up" (2019)	"Take You Home" (2019)

Music video
- "Give You Up" on YouTube

"Give You Up" is a song by English recording artist Dido, as the first single from her fifth studio album Still on My Mind, Dido's first single in six years. The song was released on 22 January 2019. It became Dido's fifth number one on the US Billboard Dance Club Songs chart in June 2019.

== Reception ==
Jon Blistein of Rolling Stone wrote that the song "boasts a simple arrangement that finds Dido crooning over steady piano plunks, while an atmospheric blend of backing vocals, white noise and kick drums provides texture and warmth".

== Chart performance ==
Thanks to an array of remixes, "Give You Up" became Dido's fifth number one on the US Billboard Dance Club Songs chart for the week dated June 22, 2019. This marked Dido's first number one in nearly 15 years, since "Sand in My Shoes" topped the chart in 2004.

== Music video ==
The music video of the song was released on 19 February 2019, directed by Sophie Muller.

== Track listings ==
- Digital download 1
1. "Give You Up" (Edit) – 3:19
- Digital download 2
1. "Give You Up" (Mark Knight Remix) (Edit) – 3:10
2. "Give You Up" (Mark Knight Remix) – 5:57
- Digital download 3
1. "Give You Up" (Laibert Remix) (Edit) – 4:03
2. "Give You Up" (Laibert Remix) – 5:59

== Credits and personnel ==
- Dido – vocals
- Si Hulbert – production, engineering, mixing, programming, instruments
- Dee Adam – production, engineering, mixing, programming, instruments
- Joseph William Bernie – additional vocals
- Miles Showell – mastering

== Charts ==
=== Weekly charts ===
Chart (2019)	Peak position
Scotland (OCC)	39
UK Singles Downloads (OCC)	34
US Adult Contemporary (Billboard)	13
US Dance Club Songs (Billboard)	1

=== Year-end charts ===
Chart (2019)	Position
US Adult Contemporary (Billboard)	33
US Dance Club Songs (Billboard)	9

== See also ==
- List of Billboard number-one dance songs of 2019

== Release history ==
Region	Date	Format	Label
United Kingdom	22 January 2019	Digital download; streaming	BMG
