= All You Want =

2000 single by Dido

Promotional single by Dido

from the album No Angel
- B-side: "Christmas Day"
- Released: 10 December 2001
- Length: 3:53
- Label: Arista; Cheeky
- Songwriters: Dido Armstrong; Paulie Herman; Rollo Armstrong
- Producers: Rick Nowels; Dido

Audio
- "All You Want" on YouTube

"All You Want" is a song recorded by English singer-songwriter Dido for her debut studio album No Angel (1999). The single was released as an exclusive 3-inch mini-disc in the UK, making it ineligible to chart. The track was used at the end of the penultimate episode of the first series of Sky One's Mile High.

== Track listing ==
UK limited-edition mini-CD single

1. "All You Want" (radio edit) – 4:03
2. "All You Want" (Divide & Rule remix) – 7:17
3. "All You Want" (live) – 4:13
4. "Christmas Day" – 4:03

== Credits and personnel ==
Credits are lifted from the UK mini-CD single liner notes and the No Angel album booklet.

Studio

- Mastered at Sterling Sound (New York City)

Personnel

- Dido – writing (as Dido Armstrong), all vocals
- Paulie Herman – writing
- Rollo Armstrong – writing
- Rick Nowels – acoustic guitar, keyboards, Wurlitzer, Chamberlin, production
- Rusty Anderson – electric guitar
- John Themis – electric guitar, percussion
- John Pierce – bass
- Richie Stevens – additional live drums and percussion
- James Sanger – programming
- Ash Howes – recording, mixing
- Randy Wine – US recording engineer
- Tom Coyne – mastering
