= Thank You (Dido song) =

2000 single by Dido

Single by Dido

from the album Sliding Doors (Music from the Motion Picture) and No Angel
- Released: 18 September 2000
- Studio: The Church (London, England)
- Genre: Soft pop
- Length: 3:44
- Label: Arista; BMG; Cheeky
- Songwriters: Dido Armstrong; Paul Herman
- Producers: Rollo; Dido

Dido singles chronology
"Here with Me" (1999)	"Thank You" (2000)	"Stan" (2000)

Audio sample
- Dido's "Thank You" from No Angel: file; help

Music video
- "Thank You" on YouTube

"Thank You" is a song written and performed by English singer-songwriter Dido. The song made its first appearance in 1998 on the soundtrack of the movie Sliding Doors. It was later included on Dido's 1999 debut album, No Angel, and was released as a single on 18 September 2000. The same year, American rapper Eminem sampled the track for his hit single "Stan", which helped propel "Thank You" and No Angel to mainstream success.

"Thank You" peaked at number three on the US Billboard Hot 100 chart in April 2001—becoming Dido's first and only top-10 single in the United States—and topped four other Billboard charts. In the United Kingdom, "Thank You" reached number three, becoming the singer's second solo top-five hit in the United Kingdom. It topped Canada's airplay charts and peaked at number one in both Croatia and Portugal, entering the top 40 in at least 15 countries worldwide.

== Background and composition ==
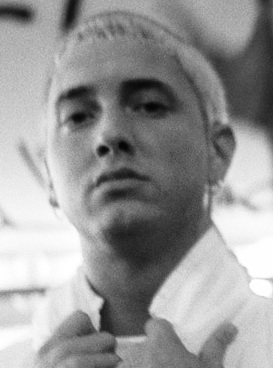
"Thank You" received significant success following its sampling in "Stan" by American rapper Eminem.

Dido wrote the song about her boyfriend at the time, Bob Page, who she had met in 1995. Lyrically, the song focuses on themes of depression, but lines such as "your picture on the wall reminds me that it's not so bad" suggests that love and romance can bring reassurance and encouragement during dark periods for individuals. The song first appeared during the end credits of the 1998 movie Sliding Doors. A year following the song's inclusion in the soundtrack for the movie, it was included on Dido's debut album, No Angel.

In 2000, American rapper Eminem sampled the opening verse of "Thank You" on his single "Stan" after he heard the song on the soundtrack album for Sliding Doors, which was given to him by one of his associates. As a result of this early success, by 2001, Dido was credited as being "the world's best-selling female music star".

The song is classified as a soft pop song with pop elements. The song's verses are written in the key of G♯ minor with a tempo of 80 beats per minute in common time and a chord progression of G♯m – Emaj7 – F♯ – B – F♯/A♯. Dido's vocals span from F♯_{3} to B_{4} in the song.

=== Legal dispute ===
In 2004, Dido sued Eminem for unpaid royalties of £1,000,000 (US$1,800,000)

== Release ==
"Thank You" was first released in the United States, where it was serviced to triple-A radio on 18 September 2000. It was then sent to adult contemporary (AC) radio on 6 November 2000, followed by a release to contemporary hit radio (CHR) on 9 January 2001. It was also available as a digital download when the Bertelsmann Music Group (BMG) launched its downloads site on 10 October 2000. On 21 May 2001, "Thank You" was released in various European countries, including Dido's native United Kingdom. In the UK, it was issued across three formats: a 12-inch vinyl single, a CD single, and a cassette single. The CD single contains the album version of "Thank You" as well as remixes from both Deep Dish and Skinny. The cassette includes only the Deep Dish remix while the 12-inch single features the vocal version of the remix on side A and the dub version on side B. The same 12-inch vinyl was issued in the United States, along with a CD that includes the album version, the Skinny remix, and both versions of the Deep Dish remix. In Europe, a similar maxi-CD was issued that replaces the Deep Dish dub with an enhanced element that features the song's music video.

== Critical reception ==
"Thank You" received widespread acclaim from music critics, who thought the ballad was very "touching and soft" and an instant standout to the album. Jeff Burger from AllMusic had highlighted "Thank You" as an album standout. Christian Ward from NME wrote, "'Thank You', which, far from conjuring up images of lunatic fan-worship, (Note: Referring to the plot of the Eminem song "Stan", which notably samples "Thank You".) is more reminiscent of the Corrs. Now that really is sick."

== Commercial performance ==
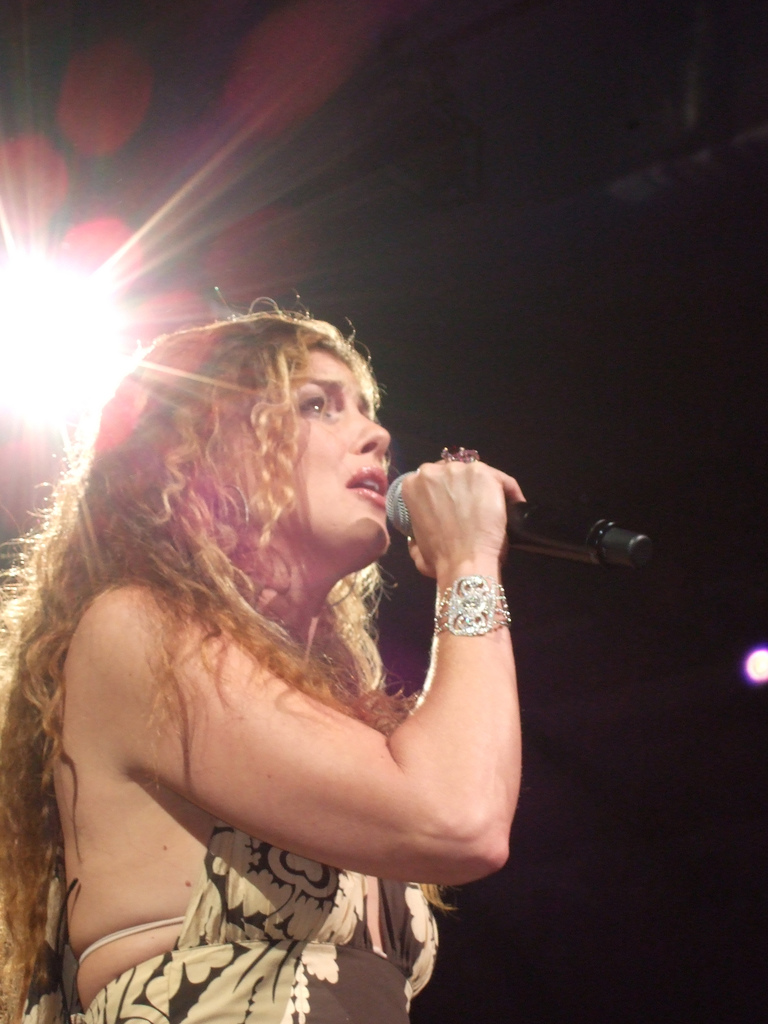
"Thank You" tied "There You'll Be" by Faith Hill (pictured in 2006) at number one on the US Adult Contemporary chart in September 2001. Billboard utilised three tiebreakers to determine the number-one single.

"Thank You" entered the US Billboard Hot 100 chart at number 80 on 13 January 2001. Fifteen weeks later, on 28 April, the single rose to its peak of number three, giving Dido her highest-charting single in the US. It held its peak for three weeks before falling to number six on 19 May. The song spent a total of 39 weeks on the Billboard Hot 100 and ended 2001 as the United States' eighth-most-successful hit. It additionally reached number one on the Billboard Adult Contemporary, Adult Top 40, Dance Club Play, and Maxi-Singles Sales charts. On the Adult Contemporary chart, "Thank You" experienced a chart first when it tied Faith Hill's "There You'll Be" at number one on the week of 1 September 2001. Because the same number of radio stations were airing the two tracks, and because both songs had lost detections that week, a third tiebreaker was invoked: the smallest decrease in radio plays. "Thank You" lost 15 plays compared to the 125 plays that "There You'll Be" lost, so "Thank You" ascended to the top spot. On other Billboard charts, "Thank You" peaked at number three on the Triple-A chart and number two on the Mainstream Top 40. In June 2006, the Recording Industry Association of America (RIAA) awarded the song a gold certification for selling over 500,000 digital copies in the US alone.

"Thank You" was the third-most-played radio hit in Canada, topping the country's all-format and CHR charts and peaking at number two on the AC ranking. On the Canadian Singles Chart, which tracked physical sales only, it peaked at number 10 and was the 60th-best-selling single of 2001 according to Nielsen SoundScan. In the United Kingdom, the song peaked at number three on the UK Singles Chart, number two on the Scottish Singles Chart, and number five on the UK Dance Singles Chart. On the UK Singles Chart, it became Dido's second solo top-10 hit as well as her highest-charting solo hit until "White Flag" in 2003. It stayed in the UK top 100 for 10 weeks and came in at number 78 on the UK year-end chart for 2001. The British Phonographic Industry (BPI) awarded the track a platinum certification in November 2023 for sales and streaming figures exceeding 600,000 units. In Ireland, "Thank You" debuted and peaked at number five on the chart dated 24 May 2001. It remained within the top 50 of the Irish Singles Chart for a total of eight weeks and was Ireland's 83rd-most-successful hit of 2001.

In mainland Europe, "Thank You" topped the charts of Croatia and Portugal. It entered the top 10 of the Eurochart Hot 100, peaking at number 10, and also reached the top 10 in Poland and Spain. In Austria, Belgium (Flanders and Wallonia), France, the Netherlands, Norway, and Switzerland, it was a top-30 hit. Elsewhere in Europe, the song peaked at number 41 in both Germany and Italy, number 42 in Sweden, and number 89 in Moldova (in 2025). In New Zealand, "Thank You" debuted at number 47 on the RIANZ Singles Chart on 24 December 2000 and went on to peak at number three for three weeks in February and March 2001. It is Dido's joint-highest-charting hit in New Zealand (along with "Here with Me") as well as her longest-charting song, remaining within the top 50 for 25 nonconsecutive weeks. It ended the year at number 14 on New Zealand's year-end chart and was certified double platinum by Recorded Music NZ (RMNZ) for sales and streams of over 60,000 units. The single was not released in Australia, but it became a hit in dance clubs, reaching number two on the Australian Club Chart. "Thank You" also achieved success in Brazil, where it was the second-most-successful hit of 2001 according to Crowley Broadcast Analysis.

== Music video ==
Dido as she appears in the music video

The video was directed by Dave Meyers, and was released in January 2001. It follows the result of Dido having not paid her bills, with the government coming to demolish down her house as a result. The police put an eviction notice on her door and movers start moving her furniture out. Dido is seen singing the song. In contrast, it could also be suggested that Dido is being evicted as a result of construction work ongoing surrounding her home, as the video shows her house situated within a construction site with high rise buildings beside it, appearing out of place.

During the first chorus of the song, Dido has a cup of tea whilst movers pile her belongings by an outside wall, and a mover steps on flowers in her front yard. In the end, she is escorted out of her home, her home is demolished, she leaves behind most of her belongings, and walks away with just her shoulder bag, an umbrella, and a hair dryer.

By the end of the video, it confirms that her house is actually being demolished for redevelopment, and not because she has not paid her bills as was initially suggested at the beginning of the video. The confirmation that her home is being demolished as a result of regeneration and construction work comes from the fact her home is sandwiched between two large skyscrapers. VEVO released an acoustic version of the song in December 2012, and a live concert version was released in August 2016.

== Track listings ==
- UK CD single
1. "Thank You" (album version) – 3:39
2. "Thank You" (Deep Dish vocal) – 9:29
3. "Thank You" (Skinny mix) – 3:20
- UK and US 12-inch single

A. "Thank You" (Deep Dish vocal) – 9:29
B. "Thank You" (Deep Dish dub) – 10:29 (10:40 on US pressings)

- UK cassette single and European CD single
1. "Thank You" (album version) – 3:39
2. "Thank You" (Deep Dish vocal) – 9:29
- European maxi-CD single
1. "Thank You" (album version) – 3:39
2. "Thank You" (Deep Dish vocal) – 9:29
3. "Thank You" (Skinny mix) – 3:20
4. "Thank You" (enhanced video version)
- US CD single
1. "Thank You" (album version) – 3:39
2. "Thank You" (Skinny remix) – 3:19
3. "Thank You" (Deep Dish vocal) – 4:10
4. "Thank You" (Deep Dish dub) – 10:40

== Credits and personnel ==
Credits are lifted from the UK CD single liner notes and the No Angel album booklet.

Studios

- Recorded and mixed at The Church Studios (London, England)
- Mastered at Sterling Sound (New York City)

Personnel

- Dido – writing (as Dido Armstrong), all vocals, recorder production
- Paul Herman – writing, guitar
- Mark Bates – piano, keyboards
- Mal Hyde-Smith – percussion
- Rollo – production, programming
- Goetz – recording
- Phill Brown – mixing
- Tom Coyne – mastering
- Richard Andrews – artwork design
- Simon Emmett – photography

== Charts ==
=== Weekly charts ===
Weekly chart performance for "Thank You"
Chart (2001–2002)	Peak position
Australian Club Chart (ARIA)	2
Austria (Ö3 Austria Top 40)	25
Belgium (Ultratop 50 Flanders)	22
Belgium (Ultratop 50 Wallonia)	29
Canada (Nielsen SoundScan)	10
Canada Radio (Nielsen BDS)	1
Canada AC (Nielsen BDS)	2
Canada CHR (Nielsen BDS)	1
Croatia (HRT)	1
Europe (Eurochart Hot 100)	10
France (SNEP)	30
Germany (GfK)	41
Ireland (IRMA)	5
Italy (FIMI)	41
Netherlands (Dutch Top 40)	18
Netherlands (Single Top 100)	29
New Zealand (Recorded Music NZ)	3
Norway (VG-lista)	17
Poland (PiF PaF)	8
Portugal (AFP)	1
Scottish Singles Sales (Official Charts)	2
Spain (Promusicae)	9
Sweden (Sverigetopplistan)	42
Switzerland (Schweizer Hitparade)	16
UK Singles (Official Charts)	3
UK Dance (Official Charts)	5
US Billboard Hot 100	3
US Adult Alternative Airplay (Billboard)	3
US Adult Contemporary (Billboard)	1
US Adult Pop Airplay (Billboard)	1
US Dance Club Songs (Billboard)	1
US Dance Singles Sales (Billboard)	1
US Pop Airplay (Billboard)	2

2025 weekly chart performance for "Thank You"
Chart (2025)	Peak position
Moldova Airplay (TopHit)	89

=== Year-end charts ===
2001 year-end chart performance for "Thank You"
Chart (2001)	Position
Brazil (Crowley)	2
Canada (Nielsen SoundScan)	60
Canada Radio (Nielsen BDS)	3
Ireland (IRMA)	83
New Zealand (RIANZ)	14
UK Singles (OCC)	78
US Billboard Hot 100	8
US Adult Contemporary (Billboard)	4
US Adult Top 40 (Billboard)	2
US Dance Club Play (Billboard)	40
US Mainstream Top 40 (Billboard)	16
US Triple-A (Billboard)	7

2002 year-end chart performance for "Thank You"
Chart (2002)	Position
US Adult Contemporary (Billboard)	6
US Maxi-Singles Sales (Billboard)	9

== Certifications ==
Certifications and sales for "Thank You"
Region	Certification	Certified units/sales
Denmark (IFPI Danmark)	Gold	45,000^{‡}
New Zealand (RMNZ)	2× Platinum	60,000^{‡}
Spain (Promusicae)	Gold	30,000^{‡}
United Kingdom (BPI)	Platinum	600,000^{‡}
United States (RIAA)	Gold	500,000^{*}
^{*} Sales figures based on certification alone.^{‡} Sales+streaming figures based on certification alone.

== Release history ==
Release dates and formats for "Thank You"
Region	Date	Format(s)	Label(s)	Ref.
United States	18 September 2000	Triple A radio	Arista; Cheeky	
United States	10 October 2000	Digital download	Arista; Cheeky	
United States	6 November 2000	Hot adult contemporary radio	Arista; Cheeky	
United States	9 January 2001	Contemporary hit radio	Arista; Cheeky	
Finland	21 May 2001	CD	Arista; BMG; Cheeky	
Norway	21 May 2001	CD	Arista; BMG; Cheeky	
Sweden	21 May 2001	CD	Arista; BMG; Cheeky	
United Kingdom	21 May 2001	12-inch vinyl; CD; cassette	Arista; BMG; Cheeky	

== Cover versions, remixes, and samples ==
=== Eminem's "Stan" ===
Eminem's critically acclaimed number-one single "Stan" samples the first verse of the song for its chorus. Dido herself appears in the music video for "Stan" (alongside Devon Sawa) as the pregnant girlfriend of the titular obsessed, suicidal and homicidal Eminem fan, and has made appearances on Eminem's tours to perform the song. When Eminem performed "Stan" live at the 2001 Grammy Awards, Elton John sang the Dido sample as he played keyboard during the performance. The sampling usage helped bring mainstream attention to "Thank You" and its parent album.

=== Deep Dish version ===
House music duo Deep Dish remixed the song. It won a Grammy Award for Best Remixed Recording in 2002.

=== Vize and Felix Jaehn version ===
On 6 February 2020, Vize and Felix Jaehn released version of the song titled "Thank You [Not So Bad]". The vocals are by the singer Leony. The song charted in several European countries and was later included in Jaehn's album, Breathe, released on 1 October 2021.

==== Charts ====
Weekly chart performance for "Thank You [Not So Bad]"
Chart (2020)	Peak position
Austria (Ö3 Austria Top 40)	62
Finland (Suomen virallinen lista)	44
Germany (GfK)	71
Sweden (Sverigetopplistan)	61

==== Certifications ====
Certifications for "Thank You [Not So Bad]"
Region	Certification	Certified units/sales
Australia (ARIA)	Gold	35,000^{‡}
Brazil (Pro-Música Brasil)	Gold	20,000^{‡}
Canada (Music Canada)	Gold	40,000^{‡}
Denmark (IFPI Danmark)	Gold	45,000^{‡}
Germany (BVMI)	Gold	200,000^{‡}
Poland (ZPAV)	Gold	25,000^{‡}
^{‡} Sales+streaming figures based on certification alone.

=== Other notable versions ===
- In 2016, Barbadian singer Rihanna interpolated "Thank You" on her song "Never Ending" from her eighth album Anti.
- In 2016, Puerto Rican singers Kendo Kaponi and Anuel AA released the single "Me contagié", which covers the chorus of "Thank You" and partially adapted the lyrics in Spanish, sung by Anuel AA.
- In 2022, Peruvian DJ Tito Silva Music and singer Tefi C. released a parody of "Thank You" and "Stan" called "Mi Bebito Fiu Fiu", related to an alleged case of infidelity of former President Martín Vizcarra. On 8 July 2022, Tito Silva took down his parody from his YouTube channel and streaming platforms at the behest of the copyright owners due to its political tone.
- In 2023, Belgian DJ duo Dimitri Vegas & Like Mike, Dutch DJ Tiësto and Dutch DJ duo W&W released a remake of Dido's song called "Thank You (Not So Bad)".

== Legacy ==
In an interview on BBC Radio 3 in 2005, The Duchess of Kent, who worked as a classical music teacher after relinquishing royal duties, chose "Thank You" as one of her favourite pieces.

In April 2007, it was also voted number 57 in the BBC's list of the "Most Annoying Pop Songs We Hate to Love".

== See also ==
- List of Billboard Adult Contemporary number ones of 2001
