= Here with Me (Dido song) =

1999 single by Dido

Single by Dido

from the album No Angel
- Released: 17 May 1999
- Studio: Swanyard (London, England)
- Genre: Pop
- Length: 4:15 (album version); 4:05 (radio edit)
- Label: Arista; BMG; Cheeky
- Songwriters: Dido Armstrong; Paul Statham; Pascal Gabriel
- Producers: Rick Nowels; Dido

Dido singles chronology
"Here with Me" (1999)	"Thank You" (2000)

Music videos
- "Here with Me" on YouTube; "Here with Me" (alternative version) on YouTube

"Here with Me" is a song by English singer-songwriter Dido. It was the first single she released from her 1999 debut studio album, No Angel. The song was written about her then-boyfriend Bob Page. The single was released on 17 May 1999 in the United States but was not released in the United Kingdom until February 2001, serving as Dido's debut single in her home country. In other territories, it was issued as the album's second single, following "Thank You". Shortly after its release, "Here with Me" was used as the theme song for the American science fiction television programme Roswell (1999–2002).

"Here with Me" peaked at number four on the UK Singles Chart, becoming Dido's second consecutive top-five single, following "Stan", a collaboration with Eminem that incorporated, in sample form, the first verse of "Thank You". The single also became a top-five hit in France, Hungary, New Zealand, and Portugal, and it peaked at number 16 on the US Billboard Bubbling Under Hot 100 chart in October 2000. In Australia, the track reached number one on the ARIA Hitseekers Chart following Dido's live performance at the 2001 ARIA Awards.

== Music videos ==
Two distinct music videos were produced for the track. The first version was filmed in 1999, and released to the American market. The American version was directed by Big TV! and uses footage of the singer rendered in sepia tones. Dido later stated that she hoped to record a new video for international release.

The second version, shot in full colour and directed by Liz Friedlander, was released in May 2000. This became the video released to the British and European markets; the music video for the international version was filmed in downtown Toronto, Ontario, Canada.

=== Synopsis ===
The synopsis for the second version of the video begins with Dido wearing all blue clothing shooting a scene in all blue coloured bedroom set. After finishing filming she cleans herself up and takes a long walk on the streets in Downtown, Toronto. After stopping at a coffee shop to buy herself some coffee Dido immediately drops it and continues walking the streets alone thus dropping her coat in the process.

The video ends with Dido letting herself in at an apartment, where she finds a man asleep and then lies next to him in his bed before the shot zooms out to reveal itself to be a photograph with Dido back in her blue clothes and bedroom set again holding it, then turns it over and pushes it against her chest.

== Track listings ==
UK, Australian, and New Zealand CD single

1. "Here with Me" (radio edit) – 4:05
2. "Here with Me" (Lukas Burton mix) – 3:55
3. "Here with Me" (Chillin' with the Family mix) – 5:16
4. "Here with Me" (Parks & Wilson Homeyard dub) – 6:02

UK cassette single and European CD single

1. "Here with Me" (radio edit) – 4:05
2. "Here with Me" (Lukas Burton mix) – 3:55

US DVD single

1. "Here with Me" (video)
2. "Thank You" (live)
3. Photo gallery

Japanese maxi-CD single

1. "Here with Me" (radio edit)
2. "Here with Me" (Lukas Burton mix)
3. "Here with Me" (Chillin' with the Family mix)
4. "Here with Me" (Parks & Wilson Homeyard dub)
5. "Thank You" (Deep Dish dub)

== Credits and personnel ==
Credits are lifted from the UK CD single liner notes and the No Angel album booklet.

Studios

- Recorded and mixed at Swanyard Studios (London, England)
- Mastered at Sterling Sound (New York City)

Personnel

- Dido – writing (as Dido Armstrong), all vocals, production
- Paul Statham – writing, keyboards, initial pre-production and programming
- Pascal Gabriel – writing, initial pre-production and programming
- Rick Nowels – acoustic guitar, keyboards, production
- John Themis – electric guitar, percussion
- Peter-John Vettese – additional keyboards and programming
- Wil Malone – string arrangement
- Gavyn Wright – string leader
- James Sanger – programming
- Ash Howes – recording, mixing
- Tom Coyne – mastering
- Richard Andrews – artwork design
- Simon Emmett – photography

== Charts ==
=== Weekly charts ===
Chart (2000–2001)	Peak position
Australia (ARIA)	52
Austria (Ö3 Austria Top 40)	9
Belgium (Ultratop 50 Flanders)	7
Belgium (Ultratop 50 Wallonia)	25
Canada (Nielsen SoundScan)	23
Denmark (Tracklisten)	12
Europe (Eurochart Hot 100)	10
Finland (Suomen virallinen lista)	6
France (SNEP)	4
Germany (GfK)	16
Hungary (Mahasz)	5
Ireland (IRMA)	8
Italy (FIMI)	35
Netherlands (Dutch Top 40)	14
Netherlands (Single Top 100)	22
New Zealand (Recorded Music NZ)	3
Norway (VG-lista)	8
Poland Airplay (Music & Media)	3
Poland (Polish Airplay Charts)	8
Portugal (AFP)	2
Scottish Singles Sales (Official Charts)	4
Spain (Promusicae)	7
Sweden (Sverigetopplistan)	19
Switzerland (Schweizer Hitparade)	6
UK Singles (Official Charts)	4
UK Airplay (Music Week)	1
US Bubbling Under Hot 100 (Billboard)	16
US Adult Pop Airplay (Billboard)	21

=== Year-end charts ===
Chart (2000)	Position
US Adult Top 40 (Billboard)	49

Chart (2001)	Position
Belgium (Ultratop 50 Flanders)	36
Belgium (Ultratop 50 Wallonia)	94
Canada (Nielsen SoundScan)	106
Europe (Eurochart Hot 100)	39
France (SNEP)	34
Germany (Media Control)	84
Ireland (IRMA)	80
New Zealand (RIANZ)	13
Switzerland (Schweizer Hitparade)	44
UK Singles (OCC)	48
UK Airplay (Music Week)	6

== Certifications ==
Region	Certification	Certified units/sales
France (SNEP)	Gold	250,000^{*}
New Zealand (RMNZ)	Platinum	30,000^{‡}
United Kingdom (BPI)	Platinum	600,000^{‡}
^{*} Sales figures based on certification alone.^{‡} Sales+streaming figures based on certification alone.

== Release history ==
Region	Date	Format(s)	Label(s)	Ref.
United States	17 May 1999	Modern rock; triple A radio	Arista	
United States	7 June 1999	Hot adult contemporary; modern adult contemporary radio	Arista	
United States	27 July 1999	Contemporary hit radio	Arista	
United States	8 August 2000 (re-release)	Contemporary hit radio	Arista	
United Kingdom	12 February 2001	CD	Arista; BMG; Cheeky	
Sweden	19 February 2001	CD	Arista; BMG; Cheeky	
France	23 April 2001	CD	Arista; BMG; Cheeky	
Australia	11 June 2001	CD	Arista; BMG; Cheeky	
Japan	20 June 2001	CD	Arista; BMG	

== In popular culture ==
- "Here with Me" was featured as the opening song of the TV series Roswell. A cover was featured in the final scene of the first season of the rebooted series Roswell, New Mexico.
- The song was prominently featured in the 2003 romantic comedy Love Actually during a scene where one of the characters has finally, but unintentionally, revealed his love for his best friend's new wife by filming her secretly. The track appears on the movie's soundtrack album.
- "Here with Me" has been used as the haunting music featured in Victorian WorkSafe campaign advertisements, advocating safer workplaces for the sake of families.
