= Pauline Taylor =

British singer

Pauline Taylor is a British singer and songwriter who came to recognition as the lead vocalist on the singles "Love Love Love, Here I Come" by Rollo Goes Mystic and "Let This Be a Prayer" by Rollo Goes Spiritual. Both groups are pseudonyms for producer Rollo Armstrong, a member of the band Faithless.

Pauline Taylor was one of the primary lead female vocalists for Faithless. She also performed guest vocals on both of Dido's albums, and has written for a variety of artists including Melanie C, Paolo Nutini and One Eskimo.

In 1999, her song "Addicted", originally released as solo B-side track to her single "Come Down", was reworked by Faithless. The new version retained Taylor's vocal performance while adding a new rap by Maxi Jazz. The song was renamed "Addictive" and featured in both the film and soundtrack of Cruel Intentions.

Taylor released a self-titled solo album in 1999 on Cheeky Records, which spawned the underground club hit single "Constantly Waiting". The track was remixed by Rollo Armstrong and Sister Bliss. In 2005, she self-released an album of new material, A Simple Life, which included the track "Solo Flying Mystery Man", which also featured on the Faithless' Back to Mine compilation album.

Taylor was signed to the independent record label Fred, and recorded and released her third album, Up, in 2007, which contained the single of the same name.
