= Dido (singer) =

English singer (born 1971)

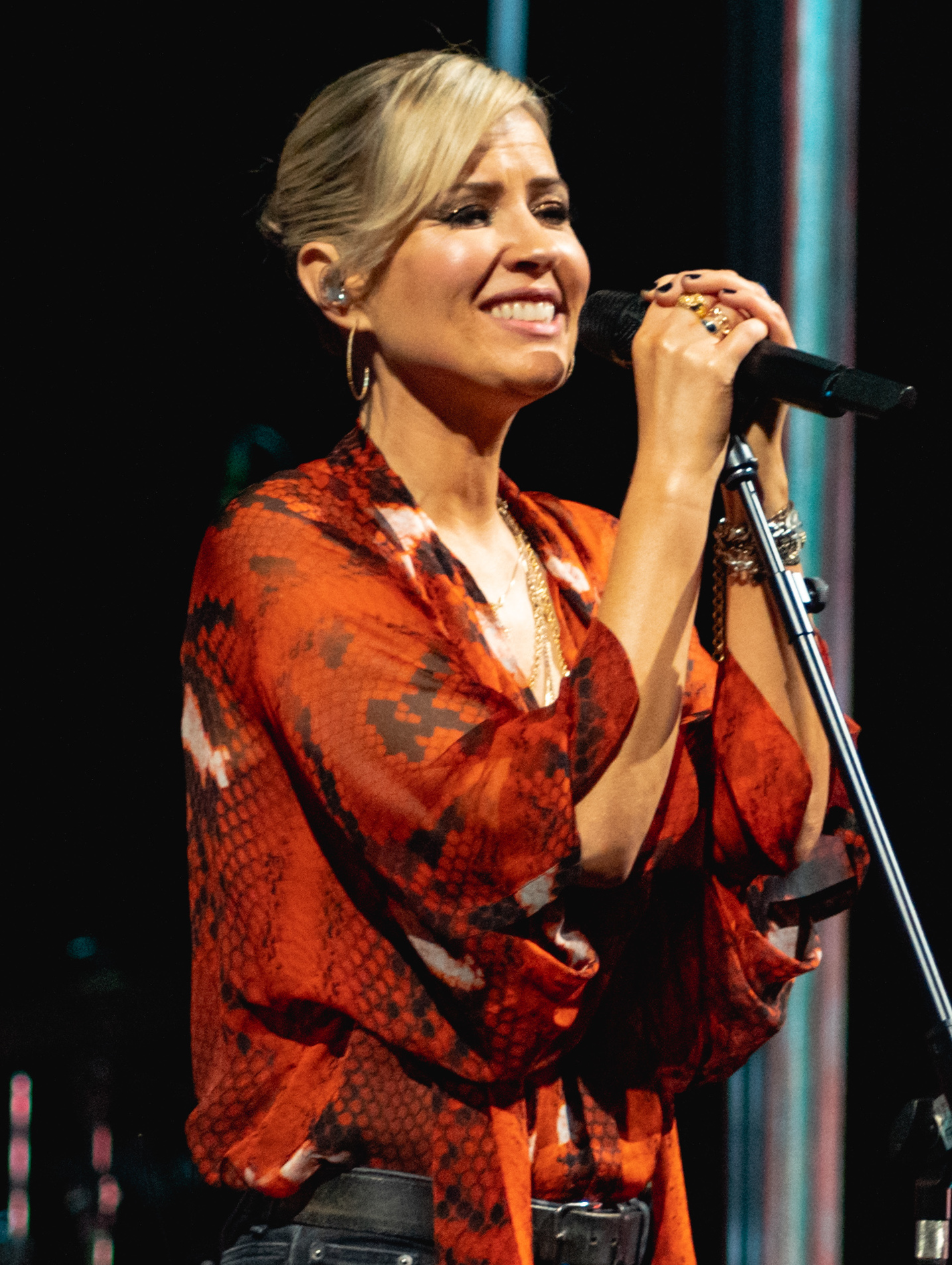
- Dido performing in 2019
- Born: 25 December 1971 (age 54); Kensington, London, England
- Citizenship: United Kingdom; Ireland
- Occupations: Singer; songwriter
- Years active: 1995–present
- Works: Discography; songs recorded
- Spouse: Rohan Gavin (m. 2010)
- Awards: Full list
- Musical career
- Genres: Electropop; downtempo; trip hop; folktronica
- Instrument: Vocals
- Labels: RCA; Cheeky; Arista; Sony Music; Legacy; BMG; Warner Chappell Music
- Website: didomusic.com

Dido Florian Cloud de Bounevialle O'Malley Armstrong (born Florian Cloud de Bounevialle Armstrong, 25 December 1971), known mononymously as Dido (/ˈdaɪdoʊ/ DY-doh), is an English singer and songwriter. She attained international success with her debut album No Angel (1999); hit singles from the album include "Here with Me" and "Thank You". It sold over 21 million copies worldwide and won her several awards, including two Brit Awards; additionally, she won Best British Album and Best British Female as well as the MTV Europe Music Award for Best New Act. The first verse of "Thank You" is sampled in "Stan", a critically acclaimed collaboration with American rapper Eminem. Her next album, Life for Rent (2003), continued her success with the hit singles "White Flag" and "Life for Rent". In 2004, Dido performed with other British and Irish artists in the Band Aid 20 version of the charity single "Do They Know It's Christmas?".

Dido's first two albums are among the best-selling albums in UK chart history, and both are in the top 10 best-selling albums of the 2000s in the UK. Her third studio album, Safe Trip Home (2008), received critical acclaim but failed to achieve the commercial success of her previous efforts. Dido was ranked No. 98 on the Billboard Decade-End artists of the 2000s (2000–2009). In 2011, Dido's duet with A. R. Rahman, "If I Rise", was nominated for the Academy Award for Best Original Song at the 83rd Academy Awards.

Dido made a comeback in 2013, releasing her fourth studio album, Girl Who Got Away, which reached the top 5 in the UK. Having taken time out of the music industry to raise her son, she reappeared on stage at the 2013 Reading and Leeds festival where she reunited with Eminem. Dido released her fifth studio album, Still on My Mind, on 8 March 2019 and embarked on her first tour in 15 years in support of the new album. In May 2019, Dido received the Ivor Novello Award for Outstanding Song Collection from the British Academy of Songwriters, Composers, and Authors. In 2020, Dido co-released The Last Summer, a collaborative studio album with her brother R Plus (Rollo Armstrong).

== Early life ==
Dido was born Florian Cloud de Bounevialle Armstrong at St Mary Abbots Hospital in Kensington, London, on 25 December 1971. As she was born on Christmas Day, she also celebrates an "official birthday" on 25 June, following the example of Paddington Bear. Her mother, Clare (née Collins), is a poet of French ancestry, and her father, William O'Malley Armstrong (1938–2006), was an Irish publisher and former managing director of Sidgwick & Jackson. Her elder brother, Rowland Constantine O'Malley Armstrong, is better known as record producer Rollo, part of the British electronica trio Faithless.

Despite their birth names, the pair were known from childhood by the names Dido and Rollo. Dido considers this to be her real name, not simply a stage name or nickname. As a child, she had to deal with her birth name's ambiguous and unusual nature, which led to her being bullied and even to her pretending to have an ordinary name. In a 2001 interview, she said "To be called one thing and christened another is actually very confusing and annoying. It's one of the most irritating things that my parents did to me. ... Florian is a German man's name. That's just mean. To give your child a whole lot of odd names. They were all so embarrassing. ... I thought it was cruel to call me Dido and then expect me to just deal with it." The name Dido derives from the legendary Queen of Carthage.

Dido was educated at Thornhill Primary School in Islington, Dallington School, City of London Girls' and Westminster School, where she was taught by the contemporary musician and Head of Academic Music, Sinan Savaskan. After she stole a recorder from school at the age of five, her parents enrolled her at the Guildhall School of Music and Drama in London. At age nine she had toured Yugoslavia with a recorder orchestra. By the time she reached her teens, she had learned to play the piano, recorder, and violin. She read law at Birkbeck, University of London, while working as a literary agent. She didn't finish the degree, deciding instead to take up music full-time.

== Career ==
=== 1995–1996: Early recordings ===
In 1995, Dido began recording 10 demo tracks which were put together on a collection entitled Odds & Ends and sent out by Nettwerk management. Nettwerk had signed her after she was brought to their attention by her collaborations with Faithless, the UK dance act spearheaded by her brother, Rollo Armstrong (Dido co-wrote and provided vocals for album tracks, such as "Flowerstand Man" and "Hem of His Garment"). The collection was released by Nettwerk on CD-R and acetate disc in 1995 and featured a mixture of finished productions and demo versions, which she later considered for release on her 1999 debut album, No Angel. Odds & Ends brought her to the attention of A&R Peter Edge at Arista Records, who signed her in the US in late 1996, and negotiated a co-sign deal with her brother's independent record label, Cheeky Records. Of the tracks included on Odds & Ends, "Take My Hand" was included on all editions of No Angel as a bonus track; "Sweet Eyed Baby" was remixed and renamed to "Don't Think of Me", while "Worthless" and "Me" were released exclusively on the Japanese edition. Peter Leak became Dido's manager during the recording of No Angel after Edge played some of the in-progress recordings and was "blown away" by them.

=== 1998–2002: No Angel and breakthrough ===
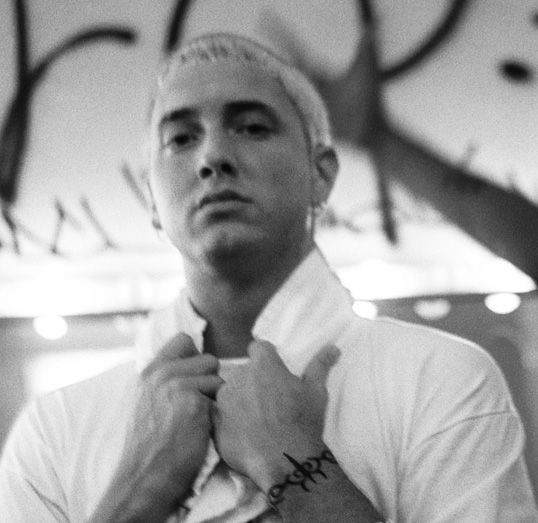
Her single "Thank You" received significant airplay and success following a sample used in "Stan" by American rapper Eminem

In 1998, the music producer for the film Sliding Doors selected her track "Thank You" for the soundtrack. Cheeky Records, to which Dido was signed, was sold to BMG records in 1999. This delayed the release of the album No Angel in the United Kingdom, but also allowed her to concentrate on promoting No Angel in the United States, including a slot on Sarah McLachlan's Lilith Fair tour. Through touring, both before and after the album was available, Dido's music began to receive more exposure. The first official single chosen by Dido and her label, "Here with Me", initially struggled to make an impact on radio, but while the label were considering switching to an alternative track, the song made a breakthrough as a result of its use in television programme Roswell. The song was used as the theme music of the show, but it was actually when it was played in its entirety during the season finale that it really made an impact with audiences.

Manager Peter Leak told HitQuarters that sales jumped from 2,000 to 9,000 units during the week of the show's transmission. It was this as well as the airplay on MTV throughout Europe of the single's video, which brought her mass attention. Subsequently, the song was used in the British romantic comedy Love Actually. No Angel was released in 1999, and Dido toured extensively to promote the record.

American rapper Eminem helped introduce Dido to a US audience in 2000 when he received permission from Dido herself to sample the first verse of "Thank You" in his hit single "Stan". Dido also appeared in the music video as Stan's pregnant girlfriend. She did not want to do the video at first, as she was uncomfortable with the scene in the video where she had to be tied up and have her mouth covered with duct tape, but later agreed to it and got along well with Eminem and the crew on set. In North America, the video usually aired with the trunk scene censored. Interest soared in her debut album, leading it to hit charts in Europe on import sales alone, charting in the top five on the UK Albums Chart before its official UK re-release.

No Angel went on to become the top-selling album of 2001 worldwide, debuting at, and returning to, number one in the official UK Albums Chart many times throughout the year. It spawned two top ten hit singles, "Here with Me" and "Thank You", a further top twenty hit, "Hunter" and a fourth and final single release "All You Want", which reached the top 25. It was certified platinum in over thirty-five countries, and is estimated to have sold over 21 million copies worldwide. In America, "Don't Think of Me" was released as the second single, peaking at number 35 on the US Billboard Adult Top 40 in May 2000.

Dido's widely emulated hairstyle at this time became known as the "Dido flip". Her sold-out worldwide tour featured hip-hop artist Pete Miser as her live band's DJ. No Angel claimed No. 97 according to the Decade-end Album Chart by Billboard.

=== 2003–2005: Life for Rent and Live 8 ===
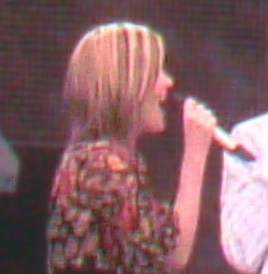
Dido performing "7 Seconds" at Live 8 in Hyde Park

Life for Rent was released in 2003. Produced by her brother Rollo Armstrong and American songwriter Rick Nowels, work on the album began in mid-2002. It was certified 9× Platinum by the BPI, and sold over 12 million copies worldwide, making it the fourth best-selling album worldwide of 2003. The album became the seventh best-selling album of the 2000s in the United Kingdom, making Dido the only singer to have two albums in the top 10 list. Preceded by the hit single "White Flag", the album sold over 152,000 copies in the first day alone in the UK, and went on to sell over 400,000 in the first week. Three further singles—"Life for Rent", "Don't Leave Home" and "Sand in My Shoes"—were lifted from the album, with Dido embarking on a worldwide tour in support of the album (a DVD of footage from the tour was released in 2005 entitled Live at Brixton Academy). As of 2015, Life for Rent is the 34th best-selling album in UK chart history. In 2019 it was listed the 15th best-selling album of the 21st century in the UK.

Following her sold-out world tour of 2004, Dido was asked to perform at three of the Live 8 concerts on 2 July 2005—performing in London, then at the Eden Project in Cornwall, before flying over to Paris, performing both solo ("White Flag") and duetting with Youssou N'Dour ("Thank You" and "Seven Seconds"). Also in 2005, Dido provided vocals for her brother's side project Dusted on the album Safe from Harm. She sings on the tracks: "Time Takes Time", "Hurt U" and "Winter", and she co-wrote three tracks on the album: "Always Remember to Respect & Honour Your Mother, Part 1", "The Biggest Fool in the World" and "Winter".

=== 2006–2008: Safe Trip Home and hiatus ===
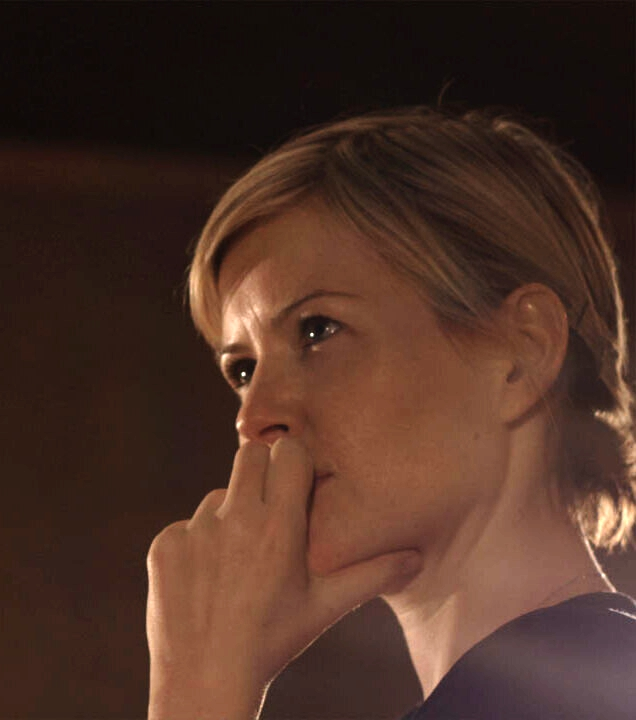
Dido in the recording studio, 2008

Dido's third album, Safe Trip Home, was released in November 2008. The album, which Dido began work on in October 2005, was produced by Jon Brion and Dido herself and features contributions from Brian Eno, Questlove, Mick Fleetwood, Rollo Armstrong, and Matt Chamberlain. Recording sessions were held at London's Abbey Road and at Jon Brion's home studio in Los Angeles. During production of the album, Dido attended evening classes in music and English at the University of California, Los Angeles. The first single from the album, "Don't Believe in Love", was released in October 2008, and a track titled "Look No Further" was made available to download from her official website for a limited time. The album failed to sell as well as No Angel or Life for Rent, and Dido opted not to tour in support of the album due to her difficulties with performing the material that was written about the death of her father. It was nominated for a Grammy Award in the category Best Engineered Album, Non-Classical.

In December 2008, Dido's Safe Trip Home song "Let's Do the Things We Normally Do", was criticised by Gregory Campbell, MP for East Londonderry and Minister for Sports, Arts and Leisure for Northern Ireland, for referencing lyrics from a song, "The Men Behind the Wire", which was written in the aftermath of the introduction of detention without trial for persons accused of being members of paramilitary groups. Campbell described "The Men Behind the Wire" as "written about people who were murderers, arsonists and terrorists", and suggested "she [Dido] should clarify her position so that her fans and the wider public knows where she stands on these things". The album's artwork features a photograph of astronaut Bruce McCandless II during a spacewalk, as part of space shuttle mission STS-41-B; McCandless sued Dido, Sony Music Entertainment, and Getty Images Inc for unauthorised use of this photo in September 2010. The case was settled under undisclosed terms on 14 January 2011.

=== 2009–2018: Girl Who Got Away and Greatest Hits ===
Shortly after the release of Safe Trip Home, Dido returned to the studio to start recording new material for inclusion on her fourth studio album. In July 2009, Dido said that the album would have an electronic approach, in an attempt to take it in a totally different direction to her previous albums. In September 2010, Dido released the single "Everything to Lose" via digital download, following its appearance on the soundtrack of the film Sex and the City 2 (released in May 2010).

In January 2011, Dido released "If I Rise", a collaboration with producer A.R. Rahman, for which an official music video was released. "If I Rise" was written for 127 Hours, a thriller film directed by Danny Boyle. The soundtrack features a mix of electric guitars with orchestral arrangements and sound loops, and "If I Rise" is featured in the climax of the film. The song was nominated for Satellite Award, Houston Film Critics Society Awards and Las Vegas Film Critics Society Award, as well as the 83rd Academy Award for Original Song. It won the Broadcast Film Critics Association Award for Best Song.

Dido's fourth album, Girl Who Got Away, was released by Sony Music Entertainment in March 2013. "No Freedom" was released as the album's lead single in January 2013. The album was recorded in London and California and features production from Rollo Armstrong, Sister Bliss, Lester Mendez, A. R. Rahman, Rick Nowels, Greg Kurstin, Brian Eno, and Jeff Bhasker. Dido appeared on the second series of the televised singing competition The Voice UK in May 2013, serving as an advisor to coach Danny O'Donoghue during the show's battle rounds.

In November 2013, Dido released the album Greatest Hits, a compilation of previous material and remixes that also included a new track, "NYC". The release of Greatest Hits completed Dido's contractual obligations with RCA Records, and she spoke of her plans to release her music independently. By late 2013, she was writing material for a fifth studio album.

=== 2018–present: Still on My Mind and The Last Summer ===
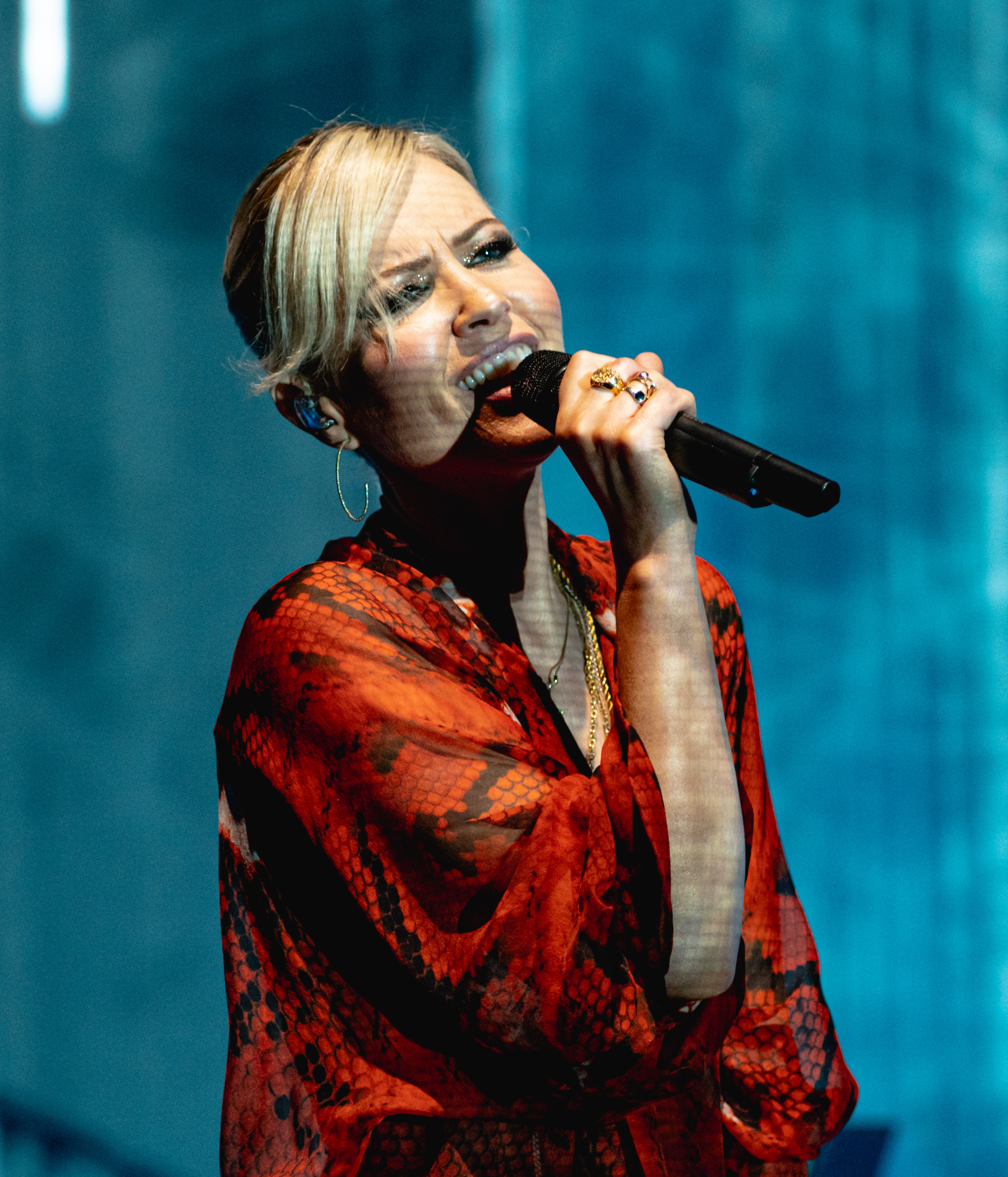
Dido performing in 2019

Dido signed to BMG to release her fifth album in early 2019. Dido worked with her brother and long-time collaborator Rollo Armstrong, along with Rick Nowels and Ryan Louder. On 9 November 2018, Dido announced her new album's title, Still on My Mind, along with its cover. It was released on 8 March 2019 and charted at number 3 on the UK Albums chart, number 1 on the UK Indie Album chart and sold over 60,000 copies in the UK. The teaser single "Hurricanes" was released on 12 November 2018. The official lead single "Give You Up" was premiered 22 January 2019 on BBC Radio 2. The single peaked at number 32 on the UK Singles Download chart. It peaked at number 1 on the US Dance Club Songs chart. "Give You Up" was followed by edited versions of "Take You Home" (released 5 April 2019) and "Friends" (released 22 July 2019) as singles. Dido toured in support of the album from May 2019, making it her first world tour in 15 years. The deluxe edition of the album was released on 15 November 2019 but failed to chart, despite the release of another single, "Just Because".

Dido was featured on her brother Rollo's The Last Summer album, which was released on 11 October 2019, under the alias "R Plus". The album charted at number 96 on the UK Album Sales Chart. Dido featured on the singles "Summer Dress", "Those Were The Days" and "My Boy", with another feature appearing on "Together (In These Times)" and alternate version of The Last Summer album track "Together". The deluxe version of The Last Summer was credited to both R Plus and Dido.

In February 2023, Dido appeared on American singer-songwriter Caroline Polachek's album Desire, I Want to Turn Into You on the track "Fly to You" alongside Polachek and singer Grimes, and is credited as a co-writer. On May 18, 2023, Jason Derulo released the single "When Love Sucks", which samples "Thank You", and includes a feature credit for Dido. On 15 November 2023, it was announced that Dido had signed with Warner Chappell Music, to distribute her discography catalogue and future music releases. In December 2023, Belgian-Greek DJ duo Dimitri Vegas & Like Mike released "Thank You (Not So Bad)" alongside Dido, Tiësto and W&W, which was a reimagining of Dido's "Thank You"; she re-recorded her vocals for the remake. It peaked at number 50 on the UK Singles Chart, and became Dido's first song to place on the main UK singles chart since "No Freedom" in 2013 and her highest charting song since 2004's "Sand In My Shoes".

On 4 September 2025, Dido was featured on a new, promotional single-version of "Find a Way" by Faithless, also featuring Suli Breaks; Dido sings a new verse and chorus on the updated track.

== Other work ==
In addition to her solo work, Dido has co-written and provided vocals for tracks with Faithless, including "One Step Too Far"—which was released in the UK as a limited edition single, where it debuted at number six—and "No Roots", the title track of the fourth Faithless album. Rollo—Dido's brother—co-writes and co-produces much of Dido's solo material, including many tracks on No Angel, Life for Rent and Safe Trip Home.

She provided guest vocals for each of the six studio albums by Faithless, from 1996's Reverence to 2010s The Dance. Dido worked with her brother on a CD to accompany the children's book he wrote with Jason White, Safe from Harm; the CD is also titled Safe from Harm and the artist is listed as "Dusted". She co-wrote Britney Spears's worldwide number one hit "I'm Not a Girl, Not Yet a Woman", and co-wrote the song "Never Ending" on Rihanna's 2016 album Anti, which also samples Dido's "Thank You".

Dido has provided guest vocals for songs by other artists including "Feels Like Fire" for Carlos Santana's 2002 album, Shaman, and a duet with Rufus Wainwright entitled "I Eat Dinner (When the Hunger's Gone)" for the Bridget Jones: The Edge of Reason soundtrack. A sample of the Dido track "Do You Have a Little Time" is used on the song "Don't You Trust Me?" by Tupac, on the posthumous album Loyal to the Game, which was almost entirely produced by Eminem in 2004.

Dido joined Annie Lennox and 21 other female artists to raise awareness of the issue of mother-to-child transmission of HIV to unborn children in Africa. The collaborative single "Sing" was released on World Aids Day on 1 December 2007, in conjunction with Lennox's appearance at the Nelson Mandela 46664 concert in South Africa.

== Personal life ==
After releasing No Angel in 1999, and after much time spent promoting the album, Dido broke up with her fiancé, entertainment lawyer Bob Page, after a twelve-year relationship.

Dido married author Rohan Gavin in 2010. They have one son, who was born in July 2011.

Dido says she is a "diehard" lifelong supporter of Premier League football club Arsenal.

She holds dual British-Irish citizenship by virtue of having an Irish father.

== Discography ==
- No Angel (1999)
- Life for Rent (2003)
- Safe Trip Home (2008)
- Girl Who Got Away (2013)
- Still on My Mind (2019)
- The Last Summer (with R Plus) (2020)

== Tours ==
- No Angel Tour (1999–2001)
- Life for Rent Tour (2004)
- Still on my Mind Tour (2019)

== See also ==
- List of British Grammy winners and nominees
