= Greatest Hits (Dido album) =

Greatest hits album by Dido
- Released: 22 November 2013
- Recorded: 1999–2013
- Length: 76:21
- Label: RCA
- Producer: Dido; Rollo; Rick Nowels; John Harrison; Mike Hedges; Jon Brion; The Ark; Brian Eno; Sister Bliss; Greg Kurstin; The 45 King; A. R. Rahman

Dido chronology
Girl Who Got Away (2013)	Greatest Hits (2013)	Still on My Mind (2019)

Greatest Hits is a greatest hits album by British singer-songwriter Dido released in 2013. The album compiles all of Dido's singles since her first album No Angel (1999), through to her then latest studio album, Girl Who Got Away (2013). The two-disc collection was released on 22 November 2013 in Ireland, and includes a new track, "NYC", as well as a collection of remixes and collaborations. The track listing was confirmed on 9 October 2013.

== Track listing ==
Credits adapted from the album's liner notes

Greatest Hits – Standard edition
No.	Title	Writer(s)	Producer(s)	Length
1.	"Here with Me" (from No Angel, 1999)	Dido Armstrong; Paul Statham; Pascal Gabriel	Dido; Rick Nowels	4:16
2.	"Thank You" (from No Angel)	D. Armstrong; Paulie Herman	Dido; Rollo	3:37
3.	"Hunter" (from No Angel)	D. Armstrong; Rollo Armstrong	Dido; Nowels	3:57
4.	"White Flag" (from Life for Rent, 2003)	D. Armstrong; R. Armstrong; Nowels	Dido; Rollo; John Harrison	4:01
5.	"Life for Rent" (from Life for Rent)	D. Armstrong; R. Armstrong	Dido; Rollo	3:42
6.	"Don't Leave Home" (from Life for Rent)	D. Armstrong; R. Armstrong	Dido; Rollo; Mike Hedges	3:48
7.	"Sand in My Shoes" (from Life for Rent)	D. Armstrong; Nowels	Dido; Rollo	5:00
8.	"Don't Believe in Love" (from Safe Trip Home, 2008)	D. Armstrong; R. Armstrong; Jon Brion	Brion	3:54
9.	"Quiet Times" (from Safe Trip Home)	D. Armstrong	Dido; The Ark	3:18
10.	"Grafton Street" (from Safe Trip Home)	D. Armstrong; R. Armstrong; Brian Eno	Dido; The Ark	5:56
11.	"Everything to Lose" (from Sex and the City 2: Original Motion Picture Soundtrack, 2010)	D. Armstrong; R. Armstrong; Ayalah Bentovim	Dido; Rollo; Sister Bliss	4:33
12.	"Let Us Move On" (featuring Kendrick Lamar, from Girl Who Got Away, 2013)	D. Armstrong; R. Armstrong; Kendrick Lamar; Jeff Bhasker; Pat Reynolds	Dido; Rollo	4:11
13.	"No Freedom" (from Girl Who Got Away)	D. Armstrong; Nowels	Dido; Rollo	3:17
14.	"End of Night" (from Girl Who Got Away)	D. Armstrong; Greg Kurstin	Kurstin	3:59
15.	"One Step Too Far" (radio edit) (Faithless featuring Dido, from Outrospective, 2001)	D. Armstrong; R. Armstrong; Bentovim; Maxwell Fraser	Rollo; Bliss	3:26
16.	"Stan" (Eminem featuring Dido, from The Marshall Mathers LP, 2000)	D. Armstrong; Herman; Marshall Mathers	The 45 King; Eminem^{[a]}	6:45
17.	"If I Rise" (with A. R. Rahman, from 127 Hours: Music from the Motion Picture, 2010)	D. Armstrong; R. Armstrong; A. R. Rahman	Rahman	4:39
18.	"NYC"	D. Armstrong; R. Armstrong; Daisy Armstrong; Kurstin	Kurstin	4:01
Total length:				1:16:21

Greatest Hits – Deluxe edition (bonus disc)
No.	Title	Writer(s)	Producer(s)	Length
1.	"Here with Me" (Chillin' with the Family Mix)	D. Armstrong; Statham; Gabriel	Dido; Rollo	5:16
2.	"Thank You" (Deep Dish Radio Edit)	D. Armstrong; Herman	Dido; Rollo; Dubfire^{[b]}^{[c]}	4:11
3.	"Hunter" (MJ Cole Remix)	D. Armstrong; R. Armstrong	Dido; Nowels; MJ Cole^{[b]}	6:08
4.	"White Flag" (Timbaland Remix)	D. Armstrong; R. Armstrong; Nowels	Dido; Rollo; Harrison; Timbaland^{[b]}	3:30
5.	"Life for Rent" (Skinny 4 Rent Mix)	D. Armstrong; R. Armstrong	Dido; Rollo; Matty^{[b]}	4:55
6.	"Sand in My Shoes" (Above & Beyond Radio Edit)	D. Armstrong; Nowels	Dido; Rollo; Above & Beyond^{[b]}	3:21
7.	"Don't Leave Home" (Gabriel & Dresden Radio Mix)	D. Armstrong; R. Armstrong	Dido; Rollo; Hedges; Josh Gabriel^{[b]}^{[c]}; Dave Dresden^{[b]}^{[c]}	4:14
8.	"Don't Believe in Love" (Dennis Ferrer's Objektivity Radio Mix)	D. Armstrong; R. Armstrong; Brion	Brion; Dennis Ferrer^{[b]}^{[c]}	4:32
9.	"No Freedom" (DJ Cobra Mix)	D. Armstrong; Nowels	Dido; Rollo; Peter Agyagos^{[b]}^{[c]}	6:20
10.	"End of Night" (Cedric Gervais Remix)	D. Armstrong; Kurstin	Kurstin; Cedric Gervais^{[b]}^{[c]}	5:53
11.	"Go Dreaming" (Mantronix Remix)	D. Armstrong; R. Armstrong; Nowels	Dido; Rollo; Kurtis Mantronik^{[b]}^{[c]}	4:31
12.	"Blackbird" (Moguai Remix)	D. Armstrong; R. Armstrong	Dido; Rollo; André Tegeler^{[b]}^{[c]}	6:46
13.	"Northern Skies" (Rollo Remix)	D. Armstrong; R. Armstrong	Dido; The Ark; Brion; Rollo^{[b]}	5:53
Total length:				2:21:51

Notes

- ^{^[a]} signifies a co-producer
- ^{^[b]} signifies a remixer
- ^{^[c]} signifies an additional producer

== Chart performance ==
Chart (2013)	Peak position
Australian ARIA Albums Chart	96
Belgian Albums (Ultratop Flanders)	81
Belgian Albums (Ultratop Wallonia)	61
China Albums Chart Sino Chart	18
Croatian International Albums Chart	11
French Albums (SNEP)	170
Irish Albums (IRMA)	41
Scottish Albums Chart	38
South Korea (Gaon International Album Chart)	31
Spanish Albums (PROMUSICAE)	85
Swiss Albums (Schweizer Hitparade)	57
Taiwan International Albums Chart (G-Music)	7
UK Albums (OCC)	27
Chart (2019)	Peak position
Scottish Albums (OCC)	29

== Certifications ==
Region	Certification	Certified units/sales
United Kingdom (BPI)	Gold	100,000^{‡}
^{‡} Sales+streaming figures based on certification alone.

== Release history ==
Region	Date	Format	Label
Ireland	22 November 2013	Standard, deluxe	RCA
United Kingdom	25 November 2013	Standard, deluxe	RCA
