= Peter Edge =

British music executive

- Born: England
- Citizenship: English-American
- Education: Coventry Polytechnic
- Occupations: Record executive, chairman and CEO of RCA Records
- Years active: 1985 - present
- Board member of: Arms Around the Child
- Awards: Billboard Power 100 (consecutive years 2012-2026)
- Website: rcarecords.com

Peter Edge is an English-American record executive. He is the chairman and CEO of RCA Records.

== Early life and education ==
Edge was born near Coventry, England. Fueled in part by his sister's record collection – which included influential records by Aretha Franklin, Otis Redding, and Marvin Gaye—he developed an early passion for music. As a university student at Coventry Polytechnic, Edge dj’d at local radio stations, clubs and parties and formed a friendship with 2 Tone and The Special AKA founder, Jerry Dammers. He graduated with honors and earned a degree in Communication Studies, which required coursework in film, art, psychology and sociology.

== Career ==
=== Switch, Chrysalis Music Publishing, Cooltempo ===
Following his graduation, Edge moved to London, where he was hired as a music researcher for Channel Four's television series Switch. He booked up-and-coming artists such as Sade and Grace Jones for Switch, and was hired by Simon Fuller to work a side gig as an A&R representative for Chrysalis Music Publishing. As he gained recognition for his “ears,” he was invited to meet with Doug D’arcy, then the head of Chrysalis Records. Edge had planned to pitch D’Arcy on creating another music program for television, but was instead recruited to start a label. In 1985, the label, Cooltempo, was launched as an imprint of Chrysalis Records, where, by then, Fuller also worked. A reflection of his own taste in music as well as the burgeoning house and hip hop scene of the mid-80s, the Cooltempo roster was anchored by pioneering hip hop artists including Doug E. Fresh, Erik B and Rakim, EPMD, The Real Roxanne, and Monie Love, as well as house artist Adeva. Edge worked in partnership with producer Danny D of D Mob, and with a string of best-selling albums and hit singles including Paul Hardcastle's "19," Monie Love's "Grandpa's Party," and Adeva's "Respect," Cooltempo became the preeminent dance label of the time.

A reflection of his own taste in music as well as the house and hip hop scene of the mid-80s, the Cooltempo roster included hip hop artists such as Doug E. Fresh, Erik B and Rakim, EPMD, The Real Roxanne, and Monie Love, as well as house artist Adeva. Edge worked in partnership with producer Danny D of D Mob, and with a string of best-selling albums and hit singles including Paul Hardcastle's "19," Monie Love's "Grandpa's Party," and Adeva's "Respect," Cooltempo became a prominent dance label of the time.

=== Warner Bros. Records, Alicia Keys, Arista Records ===
Edge began working at Warner Bros. Records in 1991, after he met Benny Medina and Lenny Waronker, who then ran the label. Over his five-year tenure at Warner Bros., he signed Monie Love to a US contract and signed and worked closely with Meshell Ndegeocello and the artists associated with Native Tongues, including the Jungle Brothers. He moved to New York in 1993.

In 1996 Edge was introduced to the then 14-year-old Alicia Keys by her manager, Jeff Robinson. Later that year, he met Clive Davis, who hired him as vice president of A&R at Arista Records. Robinson and Edge set up showcases for Keys, but the timing was off, and as Edge transitioned from Warner Brothers to Arista, Keys was signed by Columbia Records.

At Arista, Edge continued to focus on dance and pop music, notably signing the trip hop trio Faithless, who went on to sell more than 10 million records worldwide. Along with Sister Bliss and Maxi Jazz, Faithless included Rollo Armstrong, whose sister, Dido, sang on several of the group's tracks. Impressed, Edge signed Dido to Arista, and oversaw the recording of her first album, No Angel, which sold 21 million records worldwide. Edge also signed Angie Stone, a three-time Grammy nominee, in addition to others, and in 1998 was reunited with Keys, who had been released from her contract at Columbia. Edge served as the executive producer on her debut album, Songs in A Minor.

=== J Records, RCA Music Group ===
In 2000, with $150 million in funding from BMG, Davis founded J Records and brought Edge and other key executives from Arista to the newly formed label. Keys' Songs in A Minor was released on J, and entered the Billboard charts at #1. It earned five Grammy Awards, and as of 2015 had sold more than 13 million albums. Keys' catalogue has exceeded 75 million in global sales.

With Edge running A&R, J released multi-platinum records from Luther Vandross, and Jamie Foxx, among others, as well as Mario's self-titled debut album, which was certified gold. Two years after it was launched, BMG bought a majority stake in J, and it was folded into the RCA Music Group; in 2004, as the result of a joint venture between BMG and Sony, the label operated as part of the Bertelsmann Music Group. Subsequently, Edge was appointed executive vice president of A&R at RCA, and in 2007, he was named president of A&R for RCA Music Group. He continued to work with Keys—her second album, The Diary of Alicia Keys, surpassed 15 million in sales—and served as the A&R executive on Dido's multi-platinum records Life for Rent and White Flag.Edge had additional success with records by Jamie Foxx, Jazmine Sullivan and Mario, who had a worldwide hit with "Let Me Love You."

=== RCA Records ===
Following a series of sales, mergers and reorganizations between 2007 and 2011, Sony Music became the parent company of RCA Music Group, which then included Jive Records, Arista, J, and RCA. In 2011, Doug Morris, formerly the chairman of Universal Music, was named chairman of Sony Music Entertainment and, with an acknowledged focus on a&r and artist development, appointed Edge RCA Records chief executive officer. Shortly thereafter, the Jive, Arista, and J label imprints were folded into RCA Records.

Edge has remained involved in the process of making records at RCA, and works with A&R executives including Keith Naftaly, Mark Pitts, and Tunji Balogun. Under his auspices, RCA has released hit records by Christina Aguilera, Chris Brown, Kelly Clarkson, Miley Cyrus, D’Angelo, Foo Fighters, Kings of Leon, Ray LaMontagne, P!nk, Mark Ronson, Britney Spears, Justin Timberlake, Shakira, and Usher, among others, and achieved breakthrough success with artists including A$AP Rocky, A$AP Ferg, G-Eazy, Childish Gambino, H.E.R., Khalid, Miguel, Pentatonix, Bryson Tiller, SZA, and Sia.

Edge has been included on Billboard's "Power 100" list for 14 consecutive years, beginning in 2012.

== Philanthropy ==
Edge has been involved in the charitable organization Keep a Child Alive since it was established in 2003. Founded by Alicia Keys and Leigh Blake, a longtime AIDS activist, the organization provides HIV treatment, care, food and support services to children and families affected by HIV in Kenya, Rwanda, South Africa, Uganda and India. He serves on the Global Board of Directors for Arms Around The Child, an outgrowth of Keep A Child Alive, which provides housing, medical treatment, education and additional services to children who have lost their parents or are living in adversity. Edge was honored for his work with the charity in 2013 at the inauguration of The Other Ball, an annual fundraiser for Arms Around The Child.

In June 2016, both Edge and Tom Corson, then the president and COO of RCA, were presented with the music visionary of the year award by the UJA, the United Jewish Appeal. An annual award for professionals in the music industry, Corson and Edge were honored for demonstrating leadership and philanthropy, both at work and in the community. $1.2 million was raised at the 2016 event to support a network of nearly 100 nonprofits that serve 4.5 million people in New York and in 70 countries around the world through programs that provide food, medicine, job training and more to people in need.

== Discography ==
Year	Album	Artist	Credit
2016	Mind of Mine	ZAYN	A&R
2015	Love Stuff	Elle King	A&R
2015	Reality Show	Jazmine Sullivan	Producer
2015	Nina Revisited: A Tribute to Nina Simone		Producer, executive producer
2014	JHUD	Jennifer Hudson	Executive producer
2014	Shakira	Shakira	A&R
2012	Girl on Fire	Alicia Keys	A&R
2012	New Life	Monica	Producer
2012	Perfectly Imperfect	Elle Varner	Producer
2012	Two Eleven	Brandy	Executive producer
2011	Late Nights & Early Mornings	Marsha Ambrosius	Producer
2011	The Essential Whitney Houston	Whitney Houston	A&R
2010	Love & War	Daniel Merriweather	A&R, executive producer
2010	31 Minutes to Takeoff	Mike Posner	A&R
2010	Best Night of My Life	Jamie Foxx	Executive producer, producer
2010	Love Me Back	Jazmine Sullivan	Producer
2010	What Did You Think Was Going to Happen?	2AM Club	A&R
2009	D.N.A.	Mario	Producer
2009	Impossible	Daniel Merriweather	A&R
2009	The Element of Freedom	Alicia Keys	Executive producer
2009	Throwing Bricks Instead of Kisses	Inward Eye	A&R
2008	Fearless	Jazmine Sullivan	Executive producer
2008	Intuition	Jamie Foxx	Executive producer
2008	Safe Trip Home	Dido	A&R
2007	As I Am	Alicia Keys	Executive producer
2007	Go	Mario	Executive producer
2006	Blue Collar	Rhymefest	Executive Producer
2006	Defected in the House: Eivissa 06	Various artists	Executive producer
2006	East Side Story	Emily King	Executive producer
2006	MTV2 My Block: Chicago	Various artists	Executive producer
2005	Dido Live	Dido	A&R
2005	Greatest Hits Live	Angie Stone	Executive producer
2005	Stone Hits: The Very Best of Angie Stone	Angie Stone	Executive producer
2005	Unplugged	Alicia Keys	Executive producer
2005	Unpredictable	Jamie Foxx	Executive producer
2004	Don't Leave Home	Dido	A&R
2004	If I Ain't Got You	Alicia Keys	Executive producer
2004	Stone Love	Angie Stone	Executive Producer
2004	Turning Point	Mario	Executive producer
2003	Life for Rent	Dido	A&R
2003	The Diary of Alicia Keys	Alicia Keys	Executive producer
2003	White Flag/Paris	Dido	A&R
2002	How Come You Don't Call Me	Alicia Keys	Executive producer
2002	Learning From Falling	Lamya	Producer
2002	Mario	Mario	Executive producer
2002	No Fear	Abra Moore	A&R
2001	Fallin' (German CD)	Alicia Keys	A&R, executive producer
2001	Fine	Whitney Houston	A&R
2001	Luther Vandross	Luther Vandross	A&R
2001	Mahogany Soul	Angie Stone	Executive producer
2001	Olivia	Olivia	A&R
2001	Songs in A Minor	Alicia Keys	Executive producer
2001	Thank You	Dido	A&R
2000	The Greatest Hits	Whitney Houston	A&R
1999	Black Diamond	Angie Stone	Executive producer
1999	No Angel	Dido	A&R
1997	Money Talks soundtrack album	Various artists	A&R
1994	Natural Thing	Juliet Roberts	Executive producer
1994	Ambushed	Da Bush Babees	A&R
1993	In a Word or 2	Monie Love	Executive producer
1993	The Voice	Mavis Staples	Executive producer

Preceded by Barry Weiss (RCA/Jive Label Group)	Chief Executive Officer and Chairman of RCA Records; July 2011-present	Succeeded by incumbent
