= List of awards and nominations received by Dido =

English singer Dido has won numerous awards and nominations throughout her career.

== Academy Awards ==
Year	Award	Nominee	Result
2011	Best Original Song	"If I Rise"	Nominated

== Billboard Music Awards ==
Year	Nominee	Award	Result
2001	Dido	Top Female Artist	Nominated
2001	Dido	Top Billboard 200 Artist - Female	Nominated
2004	Dido	Top Adult Contemporary Artist	Won
2004	"White Flag"	Top Hot Adult Contemporary Track	Won
2004	"Stoned" (Deep Dish Remix)	Top Hot Dance Club Play Single	Nominated

== BRIT Awards ==
Year	Award	Nominee	Result
2001	Dido	Best British Female Artist	Nominated
2002	Dido	Best British Female Artist	
2002	Dido	Best British Female Artist	Won
2002	No Angel	Best British Album	Won
2002	"Thank You"	Best British Video	Nominated
2004	Dido	Best British Female Artist	Won
2004	"White Flag"	Best British Single	Won
2004	Life for Rent	Best British Album	Nominated
2010	No Angel	BRITs Album of 30 Years	Nominated

== Grammy Awards ==
Year	Nominee/Work	Award	Result
2004	"White Flag"	Best Female Pop Vocal Performance	Nominated
2010	Safe Trip Home	Best Engineered Album, Non-Classical	Nominated

== Ivor Novello Awards ==
Year	Nominee/Work	Award	Result
2002	Dido	Songwriter of the Year	Won
2002	"Thank You"	Most Performed Work	Nominated
2002	"Thank You"	Best Contemporary Song	Nominated
2004	"White Flag"	Best Song Musically and Lyrically	Nominated
2004	"White Flag"	International Hit of the Year	Won
2019	Dido	Outstanding Song Collection	Won

== MTV Video Music Awards ==
Year	Award	Nominee	Result
2001	"Thank You"	Best Female Video	Nominated
2001	"Stan" (with Eminem)	Video of the Year	Nominated
2001	"Stan" (with Eminem)	Best Rap Video	Nominated
2001	"Stan" (with Eminem)	Best Male Video	Nominated
2001	"Stan" (with Eminem)	Best Direction	Nominated
2001	"Stan" (with Eminem)	Best Cinematography	Nominated

== MTV Europe Music Awards ==
Year	Award	Nominee	Result
2001	Dido	Best New Act	Won
2001	Dido	Best Female	Nominated
2001	No Angel	Best Album	Nominated
2001	"Stan"	Best Song	Nominated
2004	Life for Rent	Best Album	Nominated

== NRJ Music Awards ==
Year	Nominee / work	Award	Result
2002	Herself	International Revelation of the Year	Won
2002	No Angel	International Album of the Year	Won
2004	Life for Rent	International Album of the Year	Won
2004	Herself	International Female Artist of the Year	Won

== World Music Awards ==
Year	Award	Nominee	Result
2002	Dido	World's Best-Selling Adult Contemporary Artist	Won
2002	Dido	World's Best-Selling Pop Female Artist	Won
2002	Dido	World's Best-Selling British Artist	Won
2003	Dido	World's Best-Selling British Artist	Nominated
2004	Dido	World's Best-Selling British Artist	Won

== Žebřík Music Awards ==
Year	Nominee / work	Award	Result	Ref.
2001	Dido	Best International Surprise	Nominated	
2001	Dido	Best International Female	Nominated	
2002	Dido	Best International Female	Nominated	
2003	Dido	Best International Female	Won	
2005	Dido	Best International Female	Nominated	

== Others ==
Year	Award	Category	Nominee	Result
2001	Blockbuster Entertainment Awards	Favorite Female: New Artist	Dido	Nominated
2001	Q Awards	Best New Act	Dido	Nominated
2001	Teen Choice Awards	Choice Female Artist	Dido	Nominated
2001	Teen Choice Awards	Choice Breakout Artist	Dido	Nominated
2001	Teen Choice Awards	Choice Music: Album	No Angel	Nominated
2001	IFPI Hong Kong Top Sales Music Awards	Top 10 Best Selling Foreign Albums	No Angel	Won
2001	Top of the Pops Awards	Best Album	No Angel	Nominated
2001	Top of the Pops Awards	Best Newcomer	Dido	Nominated
2001	BET Awards	Video of the Year	"Stan" (with Eminem)	Nominated
2001	NME Awards	Best Single	"Stan" (with Eminem)	Nominated
2001	Billboard Music Video Awards	Best Hip-Hop/Rap Video of the Year	"Stan" (with Eminem)	Nominated
2001	Much Music Video Awards	Best International Artist Video	"Stan" (with Eminem)	Won
2002	ASCAP Pop Music Awards	Song of the Year	"Thank You"	Won
2002	Golden Raspberry Awards	Worst Original Song	"I'm Not a Girl, Not Yet a Woman"	Won
2002	Silver Clef Award	Silver Clef Award	Dido	Won
2002	Meteor Ireland Music Awards	Best International Female	Dido	Nominated
2002	ECHO Awards	Best International Female	Dido	Won
2002	Danish Music Awards	Foreign Newcomer of the Year	Dido	Won
2003	Bambi Awards	Best International Pop	Dido	Won
2003	GAFFA Awards	Årets Udenlandske Sangerinde	Dido	Won
2003	IFPI Hong Kong Top Sales Music Awards	Top 10 Best Selling Foreign Albums	Life for Rent	Won
2003	Top of the Pops Awards	Album of the Year	Life for Rent	Nominated
2004	Hungarian Music Awards	Best Foreign Pop Album	Life for Rent	Nominated
2004	Danish Music Awards	Best International Hit	"White Flag"	Won
2004	MTV Asia Awards	Favorite Female Artist	Dido	Nominated
2005	International Dance Music Awards	Best Dance Artist Solo	Dido	Nominated
2005	Groovevolt Music and Fashion Awards	Best Pop Album - Female	Life for Rent	Nominated
2007	ASCAP London Awards	Songwriter of the Year	Dido	Nominated
2010	ASCAP London Awards	Songwriter of the Year	Dido	Won
2010	Houston Film Critics Society Awards	Best Original Song	"If I Rise"	Nominated
2010	Denver Film Critics Society Award	Best Original Song	"If I Rise"	Won
2010	Las Vegas Film Critics Society Awards	Best Original Song	"If I Rise"	Nominated
2010	Satellite Awards	Best Original Song	"If I Rise"	Nominated
2011	Academy Awards	Best Original Song	"If I Rise"	Nominated
2011	World Soundtrack Awards	Best Original Song Written Directly for a Film	"If I Rise"	Nominated
2011	Broadcast Film Critics Association Awards	Best Song	"If I Rise"	Won
2011	Gold Derby Awards	Best Original Song	"If I Rise"	Nominated
2011	Online Film & Television Association Awards	Best Original Song	"If I Rise"	Nominated
