= Still on My Mind =

Studio album by Dido
- Released: 8 March 2019
- Studio: RAK Studios, London
- Genre: Electro-folk
- Length: 45:27
- Label: BMG
- Producer: Dido; Rollo; Si Hulbert; Dee Adam; Ryan Louder

Dido chronology
Greatest Hits (2013)	Still on My Mind (2019)

Singles from Still on My Mind
- 1. "Give You Up" Released: 22 January 2019; 2. "Take You Home" Released: 5 April 2019; 3. "Friends" Released: 22 July 2019

Still on My Mind is the fifth studio album by English singer Dido, released on 8 March 2019 through BMG. It is her first studio album since 2013's Girl Who Got Away. The album was supported by singles "Give You Up", "Take You Home", "Friends" and "Just Because".

== Recording ==
Dido wrote and recorded the album in the UK with her brother Rollo. She said she "only wanted to make another album if it was with him", and called the recording process simple and an "absolutely magical experience", saying it was "made in such an easy way, all the vocals recorded on the sofa, a lot of it recorded at home".

Dido said she inadvertently made the album very similar to No Angel. Dido felt no one would ever hear No Angel at the time of its release and that the feeling that no one would hear her album crept into Still on My Mind because she had a good time recording it.

Dido learned a lot about production while making the album on songs like "Hell After This" and "Mad Love". She described her style of production as less professional, haphazard, and a mess compared to her brother, Rollo Armstrong, as she records everything in one take and is constantly deleting stuff. The final track on the album, "Have to Stay", was recorded in its first take as she was writing it. The person Dido was writing with, Ryan Laubscher, doesn't move chords for the first two verses of the song because he's getting to grips with what she's singing as she's singing it for the first time. Dido said she loved the feel of it so much that when she came in to record it properly, it never felt the same, so she kept the first recording.

== Music ==
The album is said to display Dido's "love of hip hop and her folk roots", and feature "a dance and electronic music sensibility". According to Neil Z. Yeung of AllMusic, Still on My Mind is essentially an electro-folk album with a "hip hop heartbeat" and elements of electro-pop, synth-pop, disco and new age.

== Critical reception ==
Professional ratings
Aggregate scores
Source	Rating
Metacritic	70/100
Review scores
Source	Rating
AllMusic	4/5 stars
Consequence of Sound	B
The Irish Times	3/5 stars
The Observer	2/5 stars
Pitchfork	6.6/10
PopMatters	8/10
musicOMH	4.5/5 stars
Mojo	3/5 stars
Q	3/5 stars
The Skinny	4/5 stars

Still on My Mind received generally positive reviews from music critics. At Metacritic, which assigns a normalized rating out of 100 to reviews from mainstream critics, the album has an average score of 70 based on 11 reviews, indicating "generally favourable reviews".

== Promotion ==
Dido first announced the single "Give You Up" while answering fan questions on Twitter, and also revealed the title of "Chances". Dido later stated in an interview with the Evening Standard that the final track on the album would be a song about parenthood titled "Have to Stay".

Dido performed "Give You Up" live on The Jonathan Ross Show, which aired on 9 March 2019.

Despite releasing a total of four singles from the album, Dido failed to promote the last three at all, due to being on tour.

== Track listing ==
Standard edition
No.	Title	Writer(s)	Producer(s)	Length
1.	"Hurricanes"	Dido Armstrong; Rollo Armstrong; Rick Nowels	Dido; Rollo	5:17
2.	"Give You Up"	Si Hulbert; Dee Adam; Rob Agostini; Denny Thakrar^{[a]}	Hulbert; Adam	3:21
3.	"Hell After This"	D. Armstrong; Ryan Laubscher	Dido; Rollo	3:27
4.	"You Don't Need a God"	D. Armstrong; R. Armstrong	Dido; Rollo	3:31
5.	"Take You Home"	D. Armstrong; R. Armstrong; Nowels	Dido; Rollo	5:05
6.	"Some Kind of Love"	D. Armstrong; R. Armstrong	Dido; Rollo	4:42
7.	"Still on My Mind"	D. Armstrong; Laubscher	Dido; Rollo; Adot Skitz^{[b]}	3:04
8.	"Mad Love"	D. Armstrong; R. Armstrong	Dido; Rollo	2:52
9.	"Walking By"	D. Armstrong; Laubscher	Dido; Ryan Louder	4:31
10.	"Friends"	D. Armstrong; Laubscher; Matt Hales	Dido; Rollo	3:23
11.	"Chances"	D. Armstrong; R. Armstrong; Adam; Guy Sigsworth	Dido; Rollo	3:31
12.	"Have to Stay"	D. Armstrong; Laubscher	Dido; Louder	2:43
Total length:				45:27

Japanese edition bonus track
No.	Title	Writer(s)	Producer(s)	Length
13.	"What Am I Doing Here"	D. Armstrong; Laubscher	Dido; Rollo	3:58
Total length:				49:20

Vinyl edition bonus track
No.	Title	Writer(s)	Producer(s)	Length
12.	"What Am I Doing Here"	D. Armstrong; Laubscher	Dido; Rollo	3:53
Total length:				46:37

Deluxe edition bonus disc
No.	Title	Writer(s)	Producer(s)	Length
1.	"Just Because"	D. Armstrong; R. Armstrong; Laubscher; Pete Miser	Dido; Rollo	4:09
2.	"This Is Love"	D. Armstrong; R. Armstrong; Laubscher	Dido; Rollo	2:59
3.	"What Am I Doing Here"	D. Armstrong; Laubscher	Dido; Rollo	3:58
4.	"Hurricanes" (live acoustic)	D. Armstrong; R. Armstrong; Nowels
5.	"Thank You" (live acoustic)	D. Armstrong; Paul Herman
6.	"White Flag" (live acoustic)	D. Armstrong; R. Armstrong; Nowels
7.	"Give You Up" (Mark Knight remix)	Hulbert; Adam; Agostini; Thakrar^{[a]}	Hulbert; Adam; Mark Knight^{[c]}
8.	"Take You Home" (Undercatt remix)	D. Armstrong; R. Armstrong; Nowels	Dido; Rollo; Luca Luperini^{[c]}; Elia Crecchi^{[c]}
Total length:				78:00

Notes

- ^{^[a]} Denny Thakrar is incorrectly credited as D. Thaker
- ^{^[b]} signifies an additional producer
- ^{^[c]} signifies a remixer

== Charts ==
=== Weekly charts ===
Chart (2019)	Peak position
Australian Albums (ARIA)	14
Austrian Albums (Ö3 Austria)	5
Belgian Albums (Ultratop Flanders)	10
Belgian Albums (Ultratop Wallonia)	12
Canadian Albums (Billboard)	12
Czech Albums (ČNS IFPI)	22
Dutch Albums (Album Top 100)	19
French Albums (SNEP)	11
German Albums (Offizielle Top 100)	6
Hungarian Albums (MAHASZ)	27
Irish Albums (IRMA)	18
Italian Albums (FIMI)	27
New Zealand Albums (RMNZ)	31
Polish Albums (ZPAV)	17
Portuguese Albums (AFP)	20
Scottish Albums (OCC)	3
Slovak Albums (ČNS IFPI)	28
Spanish Albums (PROMUSICAE)	11
Swiss Albums (Schweizer Hitparade)	4
UK Albums (OCC)	3
UK Independent Albums (OCC)	1
US Billboard 200	45
US Independent Albums (Billboard)	1

=== Year-end charts ===
Chart (2019)	Position
French Albums (SNEP)	185
Swiss Albums (Schweizer Hitparade)	94
UK Albums (OCC)	97

== Certifications ==
Certifications for Still on My Mind
Region	Certification	Certified units/sales
France (SNEP)	Gold	50,000^{‡}
United Kingdom (BPI)	Silver	60,000^{‡}
^{‡} Sales+streaming figures based on certification alone.

== Release history ==
Release dates and formats for Still on My Mind
Region	Date	Version	Format	Ref.
Various	8 March 2019	Standard	digital download; streaming	
Various	15 November 2019	Deluxe	digital download; streaming	
