= Girl Who Got Away =

Studio album by Dido
- Released: 4 March 2013
- Recorded: 2009–2012
- Studio: RAK Studios (London, England); The Green Building (Santa Monica, CA); Ark Studios (Liverpool, England); Strongroom Studios (London, England); Angel Recording Studios (London, England); Enormous Studios (Los Angeles, CA); Westlake Recording Studios (Hollywood, CA); Echo Studios (Los Angeles, CA); Ho House East (New York, NY); Ocean Way Recording (Los Angeles, CA)
- Genre: Electropop
- Length: 43:00
- Label: RCA
- Producer: Dido; Jeff Bhasker; Jon Brion; Greg Kurstin; Pete Miser; Rick Nowels; Plain Pat; P*Nut; Rollo; Sister Bliss

Dido chronology
Safe Trip Home (2008)	Girl Who Got Away (2013)	Greatest Hits (2013)

Singles from Girl Who Got Away
- 1. "No Freedom" Released: 18 January 2013; 2. "End of Night" Released: 5 May 2013

Girl Who Got Away is the fourth studio album by English recording artist Dido, released in Europe on 4 March 2013, and in North America on 26 March 2013 by RCA Records. The album followed 2008's Safe Trip Home. Recording began in 2009 and ended in 2012, at studios in London and California. Dido co-produced the album, helped by producers including Jeff Bhasker, Jon Brion, Greg Kurstin, Rick Nowels, Plain Pat, Rollo. The album features pop with elements of electropop and trip hop.

Girl Who Got Away received generally positive reviews from music critics, who complimented "folky midtempo melody" and Dido's vocal performances, while others stated that the album didn't "break any new ground". The album fared well commercially: it debuted at number five in the United Kingdom, Dido's fourth album to do so. The album peaked at number one on the Swiss Romandie album charts, at number two on the Swiss and German album charts and at number thirty two on the US Billboard 200. The album also charted within the top twenty of the Australian, Irish and New Zealand charts.

The album was preceded by promotional single "Let Us Move On" featuring Kendrick Lamar, whilst the album's lead single "No Freedom" was released in January 2013 and charted at number fifty-one on the UK Singles Chart. The second single "End of Night" was released in May 2013, however the single failed to chart at all in the United Kingdom but did make appearances on the Belgium charts. To further promote the album Dido did a series of live performances and radio shows making appearances on Jimmy Kimmel Live!, Heart London, Magic Radio, and BBC Radio 2.

== Background ==
Dido revealed shortly after the release of Safe Trip Home that she had been in the studio recording new material, slated for inclusion on her fourth studio album. In July 2009, Dido revealed that the album would have an electronic approach, in an attempt to take it in a totally different direction to her previous albums. In September 2010, Dido unveiled her brand new single, "Everything to Lose", and the track was released via digital download, having previously appeared on the Sex and the City 2 soundtrack. In January 2011, Dido unveiled a second brand new track, "If I Rise", teaming up with producer A.R. Rahman for the track, for which an official music video was released. Dido announced via her official website that the recording of the album had taken place in both London and California, and that some of the material had been recorded in her own hotel room, with a keyboard and a microphone. She also described the album as a "big, fun, electronic extravaganza".

== Music and songs ==
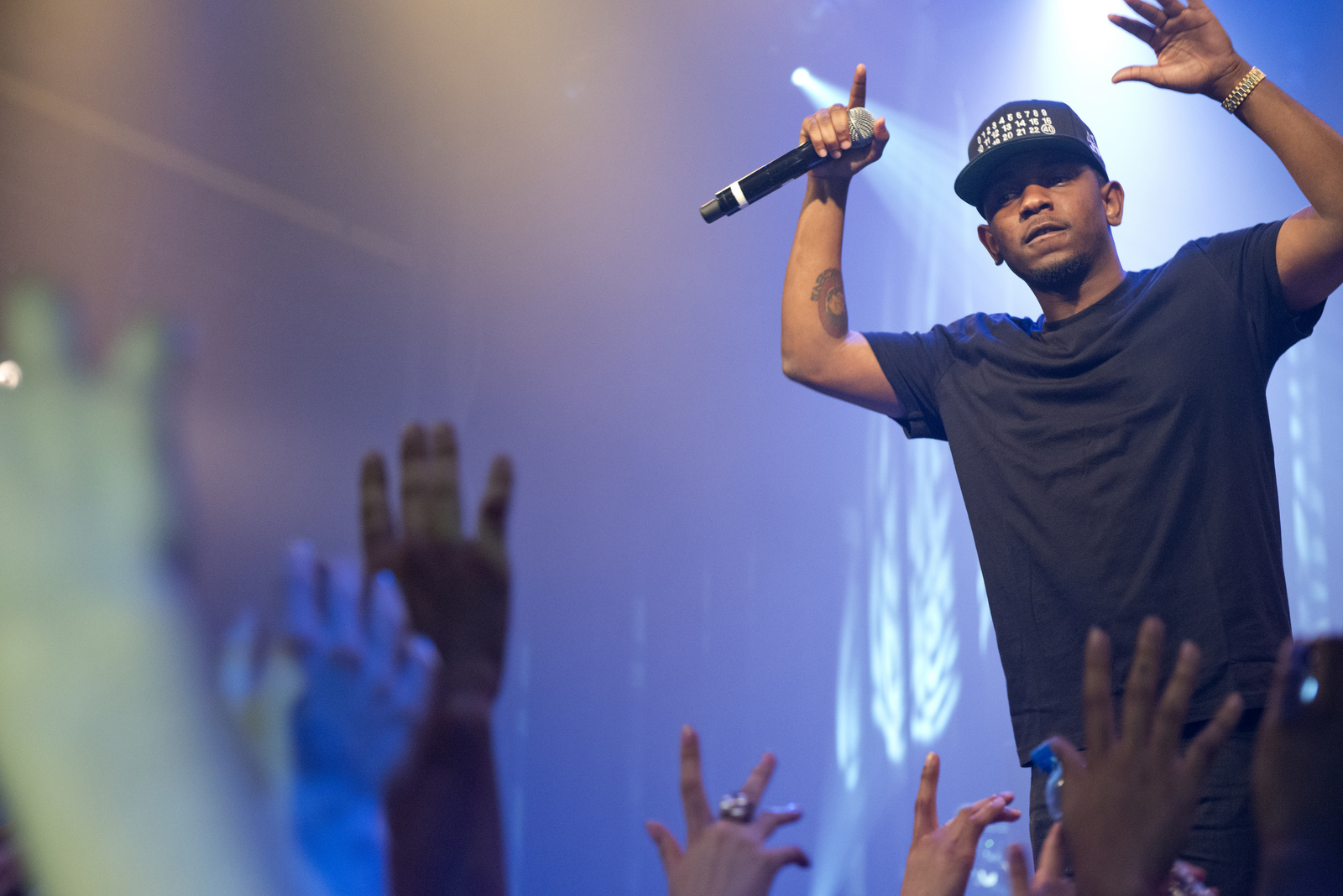
"Let Us Move On" features guest vocals from rapper Kendrick Lamar.

The opening track and lead single "No Freedom" opens with plaintive acoustic guitar and was penned with Rick Nowels, who previously wrote the major hit "White Flag" (2003). Guitars strum gently, the tempo is mid-pace, and Dido informs her man that their relationship cannot flourish unless she is free to wander. On the title track, synthesizer chords puff gentle syncopations as Dido wishes she could be "the girl who got away", shifting and twirling in a slow dance through electronic caresses and the subtlest touches of strings. In the chorus, she sings, "I wanna move with the seasons/And go with the flow". Dido finds guests to keep her current, like Kendrick Lamar, whose rap tears through the conciliatory "Let Us Move On", a spooked trip hop song. The looping intro and muted snares on "Blackbird" are leveled off by her detached vocal and reassuringly familiar lyrics about the darker side of love ("Why do I bring you love, when all you give me back is pain?", she sings). While "End of Night", co-written by Greg Kurstin, has a chorus that echoes out through a flittering line of synth thrills, with Kurstin sending electropop keyboards percolating through the bitter kiss-off to a past lover.

"Sitting on the Roof of the World" carried by folky guitar picking, reflects on sudden pop success and "not knowing how I got there or how to leave," insisting that she'd rather just "fit in" to everyday life. It offers a sobering moment of reflection, and a host of possible allusions to Dido's experiences within the music industry: "Everyone says I was lucky to have got there/ as not many can/ I'd be lying if I said I didn't miss it now and then." "Love to Blame" features a bouncy electric bassline and "finger-clicking brass" and it includes the line "there's time enough for new things yet," over "pleasingly wobbly low end", a smart instrumental section and all manner of odd bleeping effects. "Go Dreaming", which vows to rise above bullying, moves with a rubbery bassline pushing the track forward as it falls deeper into a well of electronica., while "Happy New Year" features descending bass line and trip hop backbeat, with the singer missing an ex who may be absent or dead, and "Loveless Heart" is epitomised by a vast, sweeping scope, and talks about creeping up and under the defences we’ve put around our feelings, all in an effort to cope in a hectic, modern world. And in "Day Before We Went to War," with keyboards from Brian Eno, Dido sets personal moping aside to come up with a genuine enigma: an eerily pretty vision of mass destruction.

== Marketing ==
The album's official artwork was released on 9 January 2013. On 17 December 2012 Dido released "Let Us Move On" featuring Kendrick Lamar as the first and only promotional single from the album. "No Freedom" was unveiled as the lead single from Girl Who Got Away on BBC Radio 2 at 11.30 am GMT on 11 January 2013. The music video for the song was directed by Ethan Lader. The single was released on 18 January. "End of Night" was released as the official second single from the album on 5 May 2013.

In December 2012, Dido gave an acoustic performance of songs from the album and her older material for Live from Abbey Road. The following month, Dido performed for a select crowd of record label executives and media in Mayfair. On 20 February 2013, Dido performed "No Freedom" and "White Flag" on Jimmy Kimmel Live!. A day later, Dido appeared on Nic Harcourt's KCRW radio show "Morning Becomes Eclectic". In late February, Dido appeared on numerous British radio programs promoting the album such as Heart London, Magic Radio, and BBC Radio 2. On 27 February, the full album was available for streaming on Digital Spy. Dido also appeared on Norwegian-Swedish television talk show Skavlan and British daytime television programme This Morning.

== Critical reception ==
Professional ratings
Aggregate scores
Source	Rating
Metacritic	59/100
Review scores
Source	Rating
AllMusic	3.5/5 stars
Digital Spy	4/5 stars
Entertainment Weekly	B+
The Guardian	3/5 stars
The Independent	2/5 stars
Mojo	3/5 stars
musicOMH	4/5 stars
The Observer	3/5 stars
PopMatters	4/10
Uncut	2.5/5 stars

At Metacritic, which assigns a normalized rating out of 100 to reviews from mainstream critics, the album received an average score of 59 based on 12 reviews. Stephen Thomas Erlewine of AllMusic gave the album 4 (out of 5 stars), writing that, "while her last album, Safe Trip Home, was tailored for domesticity, Girl Who Got Away is a soundtrack for a night out," praising Dido for "adapting to her gently shifting surroundings, feeling perfectly at home in this neon-streaked production, savouring how it swings from understated but insistent beats to a soft acoustic bed. Perhaps it's lifestyle music, designed to reflect the aspirations and desires of her audience, but it's impeccably executed and slyly seductive lifestyle music." Robert Copsey of Digital Spy gave the album four out of five stars praising the "pleasantly folky midtempo melody and sleepy vocal" as well as the album's "unexpected and – whisper it – dancier direction". Caroline Sullivan of The Guardian called "a Dido album that doesn't induce a desire to listen to something else," calling it "surprisingly interesting."

Laurence Green of musicOMH wrote that, "As an album, it doesn't break any new ground --it doesn't try to. What it does do though is sweep itself up in a groundswell of beautiful, heart-tugging nostalgia so strong it's as if 2003 lies just beyond the window again, shimmering in the haze of the morning dew." Nick Levine of BBC Music gave a favourable review, writing that, "Admittedly, the album contains the odd soporific song like No Freedom, but these turns are outweighed by tracks with a strong tune or an unexpected hint of sadness. Certainly, there's enough going on here to make the naysayers feel guilty for blurting out that b-word." Andy Johnson of PopMatters gave the album 4 (out of 10 stars), writing that Dido's new moves on the album, "tend to feel half-baked, under-exploited or, in the case of Kendrick Lamar's appearance on 'Let Us Move On', just a bit hackneyed." For Andy Gill of The Independent, "it ticks along unremarkably on smudges of synthesiser and shuffling drum programmes, augmented by acoustic guitar or synthetic brass stabs."

== Commercial performance ==
Girl Who Got Away made it into the top 5 of seven album charts, being Dido's fourth album to do so in the United Kingdom. On the UK Albums Chart, the album debuted at number 5, becoming her fourth top-five album, but her lowest charting album (all of her previous albums, peaked inside the top-three). In France, the album charted higher, debuting and peaking at number 3, matching the same position of her previous album, Safe Trip Home, (2008). In Germany, the album debuted and peaked at number 2, her highest since Life for Rent, (2003). The album also peaked at number 2 on the Swiss Albums Chart, however it broke her strike of consecutive number-one albums (with Life for Rent and Safe Trip Home), becoming her only album to not reach the number-one position, alongside her debut album, No Angel, (1999). Nevertheless, the album peaked at number 1 in the French-speaking part of Switzerland (Romandie).

In Australia, the album only managed to peak at number 12, becoming her only album to miss the top ten. In Canada, it peaked at number 10, becoming her fourth consecutive top-ten album, but also her lowest charting album. In the United States, the album only peaked at number 32, becoming her first album to miss the top-twenty and, subsequently, her lowest charting album.

== Track listing ==
Credits adapted from the album's liner notes.

Girl Who Got Away – Standard edition
No.	Title	Writer(s)	Producer(s)	Length
1.	"No Freedom"	Dido Armstrong; Rick Nowels	Dido; Rollo; Nowels	3:16
2.	"Girl Who Got Away"	D. Armstrong; Rollo Armstrong	Dido; Rollo	3:23
3.	"Let Us Move On" (featuring Kendrick Lamar)	D. Armstrong; R. Armstrong; Jeff Bhasker; Kendrick Lamar; Pat Reynolds	Dido; Rollo	4:10
4.	"Blackbird"	D. Armstrong; R. Armstrong	Dido; Rollo	4:09
5.	"End of Night"	D. Armstrong; Greg Kurstin	Kurstin	3:58
6.	"Sitting on the Roof of the World"	D. Armstrong; R. Armstrong; Nowels	Dido; Rollo	3:18
7.	"Love to Blame"	D. Armstrong; R. Armstrong; John Harrison; Vera Bohl	Dido; Rollo; Harrison	4:36
8.	"Go Dreaming"	D. Armstrong; R. Armstrong; Nowels	Dido; Rollo	4:24
9.	"Happy New Year"	D. Armstrong; R. Armstrong; Kurstin	Kurstin	3:29
10.	"Loveless Hearts"	D. Armstrong; R. Armstrong	Dido; Rollo	3:05
11.	"Day Before We Went to War"	D. Armstrong; R. Armstrong; Brian Eno	Dido; Rollo	5:12
Total length:				43:00

Deluxe edition bonus tracks
No.	Title	Writer(s)	Producer(s)	Length
12.	"Let Us Move On" (Jeff Bhasker and Plain Pat remix)	D. Armstrong; R. Armstrong; Bhasker; Lamar; Reynolds	Bhasker; Plain Pat	4:32
13.	"All I See" (featuring Pete Miser)	D. Armstrong; Pete Ho	Dido; Rollo; Pete Miser	3:44
14.	"Just Say Yes"	D. Armstrong; R. Armstrong; Lester Mendez	Dido; Rollo	3:35
15.	"Let's Runaway"	D. Armstrong; Kurstin	Kurstin	4:23
16.	"Everything to Lose" (Armin Van Buuren remix)	D. Armstrong; R. Armstrong; Ayalah Bentovim	Dido; Rollo; Sister Bliss	5:55
17.	"Lost"	D. Armstrong; Jon Brion; Matt Chamberlain	Brion	4:17

iTunes Store bonus track
No.	Title	Length
18.	"No Freedom" (Benny Benassi remix)	5:58

Amazon MP3 and Japanese bonus track
No.	Title	Length
18.	"No Freedom" (Tom Swoon remix)	5:58

== Personnel ==
Credits adapted from the standard version of the album's liner notes.

- Dido Armstrong – vocals, keyboards, additional keyboards, bass, writer, production, mixing, programming, vocals recording
- Rollo Armstrong – production, writer, mixing, programming, drum programming
- Rick Nowels – production, writer, guitar, keyboards
- Greg Kurstin – production, mixing, engineering, programming, keyboards, bass, guitar
- Jeff Bhasker – writer, background vocals, instruments
- Kendrick Lamar – vocals, writer
- Pat Reynolds – writer, drum programming
- John "P*Nut" Harrison – writer, production, bass
- Vera Bohl – writer
- Brian Eno – writer, keyboards
- Ash Howes – mixing, additional organ and bass
- Tom Elmhirst – mixing
- Manny Maroquin – mixing
- Kieron Menzies – engineering, recording
- David Pye – engineering, additional vocal recording, chorus vocals
- Pawel Sek – engineering
- Jesse Shatkin – additional engineering
- Mike Horner – digital engineering and editing
- Richard Woodcraft – vocals recording, mixing
- Jim Scott – vocals recording
- UTRB – additional drum programming
- Sister Bliss – keyboards, additional keyboards
- Davide Rossi – string arrangement and performance
- Sally Herbert – string arrangement and performance
- David Richard Campbell – string arrangement and performance
- Tom Coyne – mastering
- Everton Nelson – violin
- Warren Zielinski – violin
- Ali Dods – violin
- Julia Singleton – violin
- Natalia Bonner – violin
- Lucy Wilkins – violin
- Rick Koster – violin
- Gareth Griffiths – violin
- Guillon Cameron – violin
- Ian Belton – violin
- Joel Derouin – violin
- Charlie Bisharat – violin
- Mario De Leon – violin
- Armen Garabedian – violin
- Julian Hallmark – violin
- Alyssa Park – violin
- Sara Parkins – violin
- Michele Richards – violin
- Bruce White – viola
- Rachel Robson – viola
- Claire Orsier – viola
- Roland Kato – viola
- Karen Elaine – viola
- Matt Funes – viola
- Ian Burdge – cello
- Chris Worsey – cello
- Sophie Harris – cello
- Larry Corbett – cello
- Daniel Smith – cello
- Richard Pryce – double bass
- Michael Valerio – double bass
- Martin Waugh – guitar
- Oli Dacombe – drums
- Jodie Linscott – percussion
- Ash Soan – drum fill
- Suzie Katayama – contractor
- Craig Logan – management
- Guy Aroch – photography
- Roma Martyniuk – art direction
- Teo Connor Studio – design

Notes

- "Love to Blame" contains a sample from "Sex Tonight" by Brian Martin

== Chart performance ==
=== Weekly charts ===
Chart (2013)	Peak position
Australian Albums (ARIA)	12
Austrian Albums (Ö3 Austria)	6
Belgian Albums (Ultratop Flanders)	14
Belgian Albums (Ultratop Wallonia)	7
Canadian Albums	10
Croatian International Albums	4
Croatian Overall Albums	19
Czech Republic Albums	12
Danish Albums (Hitlisten)	23
Finnish Albums (Suomen virallinen lista)	45
French Albums (SNEP)	3
German Albums (Offizielle Top 100)	2
Greek Albums	16
Hungarian Albums (MAHASZ)	3
Irish Albums (IRMA)	14
Italian Albums (FIMI)	24
Mexican Albums Chart	56
Netherlands (MegaCharts)	8
New Zealand Albums (RMNZ)	11
Norwegian Albums (VG-lista)	8
Polish Albums (ZPAV)	5
Scottish Albums Chart	6
South Korea Albums Chart	46
South Korea International Albums Chart	6
Spanish Albums (Promusicae)	13
Swedish Albums (Sverigetopplistan)	20
Swiss Albums (Schweizer Hitparade)	2
Swiss Albums (Romandie Charts)	1
UK Albums (OCC)	5
US Billboard 200	32

=== Year-end charts ===
Chart (2013)	Position
Belgian Albums (Ultratop Flanders)	133
Belgian Albums (Ultratop Wallonia)	93
French Albums (SNEP)	121
Hungarian Albums (MAHASZ)	76
Swiss Albums (Schweizer Hitparade)	76
UK Albums (OCC)	111

== Certifications ==
Region	Certification	Certified units/sales
Poland (ZPAV)	Gold	10,000^{*}
United Kingdom (BPI)	Silver	60,000^{*}
^{*} Sales figures based on certification alone.

== Release history ==
Region	Date	Format	Label
United Kingdom	4 March 2013	CD; deluxe edition; digital download	RCA
