= No Freedom =

Single by Dido

from the album Girl Who Got Away
- Released: 18 January 2013
- Recorded: 2009–12
- Studio: RAK Studios (London); The Green Building (Santa Monica); Ark Studios
- Genre: Pop, folktronica
- Length: 3:18
- Label: Sony Music Entertainment; RCA Records
- Songwriters: Dido Armstrong; Rick Nowels
- Producers: Dido; Rollo; Rick Nowels

Dido singles chronology
"Everything to Lose" (2012)	"No Freedom" (2013)	"End of Night" (2013)

Music video
- "No Freedom" on YouTube

"No Freedom" is a song by English recording artist Dido. The song was released on 18 January 2013 as the lead single from her fourth studio album Girl Who Got Away (2013). The song was written and produced by Dido Armstrong and Rick Nowels, while Rollo Armstrong co-produced it. "No Freedom" is an acoustic ballad, with folk pop influences.

Lyrically, the song reflects on the necessity of allowing people to have freedom within the confines of a relationship. "No Freedom" received generally favorable reviews from music critics, who praised the smooth, simple, but gorgeous sound. The song has peaked to number 51 on the UK Singles Chart, the song has also charted in Belgium, France, Germany, Netherlands and Switzerland.

== Background ==
"No Freedom" was written and produced by Dido and Rick Nowels, who has previously worked with her on the hit 'White Flag', while Rollo Armstrong co-produced it. The song was written when Dido was pregnant at the time with her first son, Stanley, and recorded her vocals right up until the day he was born. She recorded the song in Los Angeles, United States at Rick Nowels studio and finished the song at home with her brother Rollo Armstrong.

Prior to the release of the single, snippets from the DJ COBRA Remix were leaked into the Internet. The melody is substantially different from the original. Later on, Dido explained on her official Twitter account that DJ Cobra - Peter Agyagos - was mistakenly sent an old demo to remix instead the final cut of the song.

Lyrically, "No Freedom" talks about a painful story of heartbreak. According to Dido, it is more about love in general, in all its forms. The refrain, "No freedom without love", has been adopted by rebel groups in Syria. Dido told BBC News that after its release, she was getting many "letters from people who are in the middle of a war." The song is a folky, acoustic guitar-based, reggae tinged, midtempo song, featuring Dido's sleepy vocals.

== Critical reception ==
Critical reception was largely positive. Bernard Perusse of Montreal Gazette called it "simple, but gorgeous." Elliot Robinson of So So Gay wrote that the song represents the album as a whole, calling it "pleasingly catchy and enjoyably smooth." Caroline Sullivan of The Guardian was more negative, writing that "Guitars strum gently, the tempo is mid, and Dido has never sounded more listless as she wanly informs her man that their relationship can't flourish unless she's free to wander."

Chuck Campbell of Knoxville.com praised "Dido’s knack for gorgeous melody," writing that the song is a "simple, acoustic-driven opening track, that rolls out under her deliberate restraint as she sings." Nick Levine of BBC Music called it "an odd soporific song." Tim Ferrar of Recording Connection called it "one of the most subdued tracks on the record."

== Chart performance ==
On 3 March 2013 the song entered the UK Singles Chart at number 69 and climbed 18 places to number 51 the following week. On 10 March 2013 the song entered the Swiss Singles Chart at number 47, climbing to number 28 in its second week. On 16 March 2013 the song entered the French Singles Chart at number 64. The song entered the German Singles Chart at number 64, climbing to number 59 the following week. On 9 March 2013 the song entered the Dutch Singles Chart at number 98, dropping to number 100 the following week. The song has also charted in Belgium.

== Music video ==
=== Background ===
A music video to accompany the release of "No Freedom" was first released onto YouTube on 4 March 2013 at a total length of three minutes and fifteen seconds. The music video was directed by Ethan Lader and filmed in downtown Los Angeles on 9 December 2012. She is wearing a turquoise leather coat.

=== Synopsis ===
The video shows Dido standing on an empty city street surrounded by confetti. The video also features montage of old-fashioned footage from the United States and Dido sitting in the back of a vintage Chevrolet Bel Air convertible.

== Live performances and cover versions ==
In February 2013 she performed the song live on American late-night talk show Jimmy Kimmel Live!, where she also performed "White Flag". On 1 March 2013 she performed the song live on Norwegian-Swedish television talk show Skavlan. On 7 March 2013 she performed the song live on British daytime television programme This Morning.

On 3 October 2017 Miley Cyrus and Adam Sandler performed the song live on The Tonight Show Starring Jimmy Fallon as a tribute for the 2017 Las Vegas shooting victims.

== Track listing ==
Digital download
No.	Title	Length
1.	"No Freedom"	3:18
2.	"No Freedom" (Benny Benassi Remix)	6:01
3.	"No Freedom" (Tom Swoon Remix)	5:48
4.	"Quiet Times" (Live Acoustic, Abbey Road)	3:09

== Credits and personnel ==
- Written by Dido Armstrong and Rick Nowels
- Produced by Rollo, Dido and Rick Nowels
- Mixed by Ash Howes, Rollo and Dido
- Engineering and recording by Kieron Menzies
- Digital engineering by Mike Horner
- Vocals recorded by Richard Woodcraft
- Recorded at RAK recording Studios, London, The Green Building, Santa Monica, Ark Studios
- Vocals by Dido
- Guitar and keyboards by Rick Nowels
- Programming by Rollo
- Additional drum programming by UTRB
- All strings arranged and performed by Davide Rossi
- Mastered by Tom Coyne at Sterling Sound

Credits adapted from Girl Who Got Away album liner notes.

== Charts ==
=== Weekly charts ===
Weekly chart performance for "No Freedom"
Chart (2013)	Peak position
Belgium (Ultratop 50 Flanders)	43
Belgium (Ultratop 50 Wallonia)	18
CIS Airplay (TopHit)	99
France (SNEP)	64
Germany (GfK)	59
Netherlands (Single Top 100)	98
Russia (Billboard)	30
Scotland Singles (OCC)	61
South Korea (Gaon International Chart)	30
Switzerland (Schweizer Hitparade)	28
UK Singles (OCC)	51
Ukraine Airplay (TopHit)	29

=== Year-end charts ===
Year-end chart performance for "No Freedom"
Chart (2013)	Position
Ukraine Airplay (TopHit)	125

== Release history ==
Region	Date	Format	Label
Australia	18 January 2013	Digital download	Sony Music Entertainment
Belgium	18 January 2013	Digital download	Sony Music Entertainment
France	18 January 2013	Digital download	Sony Music Entertainment
India	18 January 2013	Digital download	Sony Music Entertainment
United States	18 January 2013	Digital download	RCA Records
United States	February 20, 2013	Hot AC radio	RCA Records
United States	February 20, 2013	Triple A Radio	RCA Records
Austria	22 February 2013	Digital download	Sony Music Entertainment
Denmark	22 February 2013	Digital download	Sony Music Entertainment
Finland	22 February 2013	Digital download	Sony Music Entertainment
Germany	22 February 2013	Digital download	Sony Music Entertainment
Netherlands	22 February 2013	Digital download	Sony Music Entertainment
Switzerland	22 February 2013	Digital download	Sony Music Entertainment
United Kingdom	24 February 2013	Digital download	RCA Records
