= Aubrey Nunn =

British musician

Aubrey Nunn (born 19 November 1966, Bloomsbury, North London, England) is an English bass guitarist, songwriter, producer, and educator. He is best known as a long-serving former member of the British band Faithless.

He has performed on two of the UK Top 40 Best-Selling Studio Albums of All Time.

== Musical biography ==
Having fronted the pop band Troy Tempest during the mid-1980s, Nunn gave up music to study languages, eventually teaching English at Lycée Boucher de Perthes in Picardy, Northern France.

The death of a mutual friend in 1989 saw him return to London to form The Big Truth Band with Jamie Catto (later of Faithless and 1 Giant Leap, and Paul Herman (writer and producer of Dido and Corinne Bailey-Rae) with whom he extensively toured the UK university circuit, releasing only one EP The Summer EP on Akashic Records.

In 1993, Nunn joined Heavy Stereo, (later to sign to Creation Records), fronted by Gem Archer (later of Oasis), and in 1994 toured with the heavy rock band Stiltskin (who had already achieved number one status in many European countries with their Levis' Jeans advertisement soundtrack "Inside"), simultaneously recording new material for the band with their guitarist and producer Peter Lawlor (although this was never released).

In 1994, Nunn regrouped with Paul Herman to form the rock trio Bee alongside drummer Matt Benbrook (latter of Faithless, Skinny, and writer and producer of Paolo Nutini). The band caught the attention of producer Rollo, and together they produced a demo recording, but failed to gain industry recognition.

When Bee disbanded in 1995, Rollo asked all three members to join a new studio project he was already working on with Maxi Jazz (who had been working with The Soul Food Cafe System and Jah Wobble), and the DJ/keyboardist Sister Bliss, to be named Faithless. The resulting studio sessions formed the basis of the band's debut album Reverence.

Alongside his tenure with Faithless (1995 – late 2006), Nunn contributed bass guitar performances to releases by Santana, Corinne Bailey-Rae, Dido No Angel and Life For Rent albums, both among the UK Top 40 Best-Selling Studio Albums of All Time, Sister Bliss, Freakpower, Gabrielle, Skinny, The Happening, Dina Vass, Pauline Taylor, Slovo and R. Kelly.

He has multi-instrumental, writing and production credits for Dido's Life For Rent album and has appeared as a guest with 1 Giant Leap and Tim Booth (James) for their TV appearances.

As a writer and producer he has also contributed writing and production to Polly Scattergood, Kelly Erez, Dan Akio and Paul Cattermole (S Club 7).

In 2009, he formed the studio project 'Tribadelica', with the Jamaican percussionist / vocalist Asambai, recording material for an intended album release. This was halted three months into production following Asambai's accidental death.

== Industrial history ==
Briefly employed in A&R by Champion Records' boss Mel Medalie during the early days of Faithless, he was the managing director of Faithless' production companies from 1996 to 2006.

In 2004, at the invitation of Feargal Sharkey, he joined the UK Government task force the 'Live Music Forum', to evaluate the impact of the Licensing Act 2003 on the performance of live music.

In 2007 he formed Thaitonic Productions with songwriter Alex Von Soos (All Saints) to develop new artists. The same year, he was elected a member of the London Regional Committee of the UK Musicians Union for whom he has been a frequent industry panel member.

In 2009, he joined Radio One Samui as a broadcaster, recording the highest listening figures at the station for "The 'O' Show".

In 2010, he managed and performed with the Thailand-based jazz band The Samui Syndicate, featuring Grammy Award-winning singer Keithen Carter (best known for The Mazda 'Zoom Zoom Zoom' advertisement) and Australian jazz pianist Josh Evans. The same year, he became the co-owner of The Spirit House, a cultural community centre in Maenam, Koh Samui, hosting local and international live music.

== Personal & educational life ==
Nunn's family is of Welsh descent from the Aberdare / Cwmaman area. His relatives include Stuart Cable, formerly the drummer of Welsh rock band Stereophonics and BBC broadcaster, who died in 2010.

He was educated at Highgate School.

He holds a Postgraduate Certificate in Education. Between 2010 and 2025 he was Head of Sixth Form (previously Director of Music and Head of Senior School) at The International School of Samui.
