= Learning from Falling =

Learning From Falling

Studio album by Lamya
- Released: 30 July 2002
- Genre: R&B; dance; trip hop
- Length: 54:37
- Label: J
- Producer: Peter Edge; Nellee Hooper; David Kahne; Lamya; Lester Mendez; Soulshock & Karlin; The Soundhustlers

Singles from Learning From Falling
- 1. "Empires (Bring Me Men)" Released: 23 September 2002; 2. "Black Mona Lisa" Released: 2002

Learning from Falling is the debut studio album by British singer Lamya. It was released on 30 July 2002 through J Records. The singer worked with Nellee Hooper on most of the album, while Mark Ronson, David Kahne, duo Soulshock & Karlin, and others also contributed. Lamya co-wrote and co-produced on all of Learning from Falling's 13 tracks, with "Pink Moon," a Nick Drake cover, being the only exception.

The album earned largely positive reviews from music critics but was a commercial failure, reaching number 16 on the US Top Heatseekers chart only. A remix of the album's debut single "Empires (Bring Me Men)," produced by Sander Kleinenberg, became a number one hit on Billboard's Hot Dance/Club Play chart. Second single "Black Mona Lisa" was covered by British R&B singer Maria Lawson on her eponymous album.

== Critical reception ==
Professional ratings
Review scores
Source	Rating
AllMusic	2.5/5 stars
USA Today	3/4 stars

USA Today editor Steve Jones found that "At her best, Lamya is a genre-defying artist whose exotic rhythms, ethereal vocals and eccentric lyrics create a hypnotic mix [...] and while Lamya has songs that lean more toward traditional pop, she's most intriguing when, as on "Perfect Girl," she doesn't try to fit the mold. She succeeds by celebrating her quirks." Michael Paoletta, writing for Billboard, found that with Learning from Falling, Lamya "exudes a confidence that is not studied or learned, but simply is [...] Sensual, mysterious, and provocative, Learning From Falling shines brightly."

Exclaim! critic Michael Edwards felt that Lamya "might just seem like another talented R&B star in the making, but her debut album has more depth than your run of the mill disc, thanks to some real talent. Lamya possesses a voice that is reminiscent of Nelly Furtado and Nicolette, but with a little girl sound that will prove to be an acquired taste for some people. Despite that, there are enough radio-friendly moments present to propel her into the mainstream spotlight, for at least a few minutes anyway." John Bush from AllMusic wrote that "there are a few promising tracks here, but as soon as she (and, more importantly, her executive producers) begin focusing on what can make her sound unique instead of bankable, she'll be able to get some great, consistent work done."

== Commercial performance ==
Learning from Falling reached number 16 on the US Billboard Top Heatseekers chart.

== Track listing ==
Learning from Falling track listing
No.	Title	Writer(s)	Producer(s)	Length
1.	"Empires (Bring Me Men)"	Lamya; Major	Nellee Hooper; Lamya^{[a]}	5:07
2.	"East of Anywhere"	Lamya; Major	Hooper; Lamya^{[a]}	3:57
3.	"Black Mona Lisa"	Lamya; Major	Hooper; Lamya^{[a]}	4:22
4.	"Never Enough"	Lamya; Andres Levin; Camus Celli	David Kahne; Lamya^{[a]}	4:13
5.	"Judas Kiss (Brutus Diss)"	Lamya; Louis Metoyer; Justin Stanley	Stanley; Mark Ronson; The Soundhustlers; Lamya^{[a]}	3:49
6.	"Full Frontal Fridays"	Lamya; Major	Hooper; Lamya^{[a]}	4:19
7.	"I Get Cravings"	Lamya; Stanley; Ronson	Stanley; Ronson; The Soundhustlers; Lamya^{[a]}	4:56
8.	"Splitting Atoms"	Lamya; Stanley; Ronson	Stanley; Ronson; The Soundhustlers; Lamya^{[a]}	4:08
9.	"Never's Such a Long Time"	Lamya; Rick Nowels	Kahne; Lamya^{[a]}	4:27
10.	"The Woman Who"	Lamya; Charles Stepney; Richard Rudolph	Soulshock & Karlin; Lamya^{[a]}	4:42
11.	"The Perfect Girl"	Lamya; Ronald Tomlinson; Donald George McLean	Hooper; Lamya^{[a]}	3:21
12.	"Pink Moon"	Nick Drake	Lamya; Peter Edge	2:47
13.	"Black Mona Lisa" (single mix)	Lamya; Major	Hooper; Lamya^{[a]}; Lester Mendez^{[b]}	4:10
Total length:				54:37

International bonus track
No.	Title	Writer(s)	Producer(s)	Length
14.	"Bed I Never Made"	Lamya; Carsten Schack; Kenneth Karlin	Soulshock & Karlin; Lamya^{[a]}	4:09
Total length:				58:28

Notes

- ^{^[a]} denotes co-producer(s)
- ^{^[b]} denotes remix producer(s)

== Personnel ==
- Lamya: Vocals
- Rusty Anderson – guitar
- Karen Elaine Bakunin – viola
- Chandru – violin
- Sal Cuevas – bass
- Aloke Dasgupta – sitar
- Allan Gibson – standup bass
- Lukasz Gottwald – guitar
- Jimmy Hogarth – guitar
- David Kahne – bass, keyboards, programming
- Teddy Kumpel – guitar
- Abe Laboriel Jr. – drums, percussion
- Manny Lopez – guitar
- Will Malone – arranger, conductor
- Ralph Morrison – violin
- Rick Nowels – balalaika
- Shawn Pelton – drums, percussion
- Sara Perkins – violin
- Ian Rossiter – programming
- Marsha Skins – violin
- The Soulhusters – beats, multi-instruments
- Merlyn Sturt – viola
- Fabien Waltman – programming
- Adam Zimmon – guitar

== Charts ==
Weekly chart performance for Learning from Falling
Chart (2002)	Peak position
US Heatseekers Albums (Billboard)	16
