= Sand in My Shoes =

2004 single by Dido

Single by Dido

from the album Life for Rent
- Released: 23 August 2004
- Studio: The Ark; The Church, Wessex (London, England); Cubejam (Miami, Florida)
- Length: 4:59 (album version); 3:47 (radio edit)
- Label: Arista; Cheeky
- Songwriters: Dido Armstrong; Rick Nowels
- Producers: Dido; Rollo

Dido singles chronology
"Don't Leave Home" (2004)	"Sand in My Shoes" (2004)	"Don't Believe in Love" (2008)

Music video
- "Sand in My Shoes" on YouTube

"Sand in My Shoes" is the fourth and final single release from English singer-songwriter Dido's second album, Life for Rent (2003). The lyrics describe a single woman returning from a holiday, reminiscing about a romantic encounter she had while away. Released on 23 August 2004, the single under-performed in the United Kingdom, reaching number 29 on the UK Singles Chart, but peaked at number one on the US Billboard Dance Club Play chart, giving Dido her fourth number one on that ranking. A music video directed by Alex De Rakoff was made for the song.

== Background ==
In a 2019 interview with PrideSource, when asked what the most unusual place that has given her inspiration for a song was, Dido mentioned "Sand in My Shoes". Dido ran onto a plane for a flight to Los Angeles after having been on the beach and literally had sand in her shoes. Dido said it gave her the idea to begin writing the song. Her father had fallen ill prior to the flight and Dido began writing on the plane as she said it is all she knows how to get through. Dido wrote the whole song on the plane.

== Music video ==
The music video for "Sand in My Shoes" represents the song's plot, with surreal and symbolic images of a beach city and the partners in a house, playing dominos sitting in the street and at a party, mixed with images of Dido alone and a truck unloading sand in the street. It was directed by Alex De Rakoff and Dido's love interest was portrayed by Erik Fellows.

== Track listings ==
UK CD single

1. "Sand in My Shoes" (album version)
2. "Sand in My Shoes" (Dab Hands Baleria Injection mix)
3. "Sand in My Shoes" (Beginerz vocal mix)
4. "Sand in My Shoes" (Steve Lawler We Love Ibiza mix)
5. "Sand in My Shoes" (Rollo & Mark Bates mix)

UK 12-inch single

1. "Sand in My Shoes" (Above & Beyond's UV mix) – 9:48
2. "Sand in My Shoes" (Filterheadz mix) – 8:15

European CD single

1. "Sand in My Shoes" (album version) – 4:59
2. "Sand in My Shoes" (Beginerz vocal mix) – 8:07

European maxi-CD and Australian CD single

1. "Sand in My Shoes" (album version) – 4:59
2. "Sand in My Shoes" (Dab Hands Baleria Injection mix) – 6:18
3. "Sand in My Shoes" (Beginerz vocal mix) – 8:07
4. "Sand in My Shoes" (Rollo & Mark Bates mix) – 8:07

== Credits and personnel ==
Credits are lifted from the UK CD single liner notes and the Life for Rent booklet.

Studios

- Recorded at The Ark, The Church, Wessex Studios (London, England), and Cubejam (Miami, Florida)
- Mixed at The Church (London, England)
- Mastered at Metropolis Studios (London, England)

Personnel

- Dido – writing (as Dido Armstrong), production, bass programming
- Rick Nowels – writing, Rhodes piano, keyboards, acoustic guitar
- Rusty Anderson – electric guitar
- Mark Bates – additional keyboards, programming
- Sister Bliss – additional keyboards, programming, bass programming
- Andy Treacy – live drums
- Sudha – percussion
- Rollo – production
- Phill Brown – recording
- Ash Howes – mixing, recording
- Miles Showell – mastering

== Charts ==
=== Weekly charts ===
Chart (2004)	Peak position
Australia (ARIA)	37
Austria (Ö3 Austria Top 40)	57
Belgium (Ultratip Bubbling Under Flanders)	15
Canada AC Top 30 (Radio & Records)	29
Canada Hot AC Top 30 (Radio & Records)	28
CIS Airplay (TopHit)	6
CIS Airplay (TopHit) Remix	110
Germany (GfK)	54
Greece (IFPI)	24
Hungary (Rádiós Top 40)	11
Ireland (IRMA)	27
Netherlands (Dutch Top 40)	37
Netherlands (Single Top 100)	59
Romania (Romanian Top 100)	28
Russia Airplay (TopHit)	4
Russia Airplay (TopHit) Remix	200
Scotland Singles (OCC)	28
Switzerland (Schweizer Hitparade)	95
Ukraine Airplay (TopHit)	169
Ukraine Airplay (TopHit) Remix	44
UK Singles (OCC)	29
US Adult Pop Airplay (Billboard)	24
US Dance Club Songs (Billboard) Remixes	1

=== Year-end charts ===
Chart (2004)	Position
CIS Airplay (TopHit)	11
Russia Airplay (TopHit)	4
US Adult Top 40 (Billboard)	91

== Release history ==
Region	Date	Format(s)	Label(s)	Ref.
United States	23 August 2004	Hot adult contemporary radio	Arista	
United Kingdom	13 September 2004	CD	Arista; Cheeky	
United Kingdom	20 September 2004	Digital download	Arista; Cheeky	
United States	4 October 2004	Contemporary hit radio	Arista	

== See also ==
- List of number-one dance singles of 2004 (U.S.)
