= Empires (Bring Me Men) =

Single by Lamya

from the album Learning from Falling
- Released: 23 September 2002
- Recorded: 2002
- Genre: R&B, dance
- Length: 5:07
- Label: J Records
- Songwriter(s): Lamya
- Producer(s): Nellee Hooper

Lamya singles chronology
"Empires (Bring Me Men)" (2002)	"Black Mona Lisa" (2002)

"Empires (Bring Me Men)" is a song by British singer Lamya, released in 2002. It was the first single taken from her debut album Learning from Falling.

It is based on a poem, The Coming American, commemorating the 75th anniversary of the American acquisition of the state of California, by American librarian and poet Samuel Walter Foss.

A remix of the song reached #1 on the Billboard Hot Dance Music/Club Play chart in 2002.

== Track listing ==
CD single (Europe)

1. Empires (Bring Me Men) (Radio edit) − 3:42
2. Empires (Bring Me Men) (Sander Kleinenberg Audio Paranoid Mix) − 8:42

CD single (Europe)

1. Empires (Bring Me Men) (Radio edit) − 3:42
2. Empires (Bring Me Men) (Sander Kleinenberg Audio Paranoid Mix) − 8:42
3. Empires (Bring Me Men) (Bent Mix) − 6:59
4. Empires (Bring Me Men) (video) − 3:42

Vinyl 12" (USA)

1. Empires (Bring Me Men) (Widelife Main Room Tribal Mix) − 9:17
2. Empires (Bring Me Men) (That Kid Chris Remix) − 8:56

Vinyl 12" (USA)

1. Empires (Bring Me Men) (Sander Kleinenberg Audio Paranoid Club Mix) − 8:36
2. Empires (Bring Me Men) (That Kid Chris Mix) − 8:56
3. Empires (Bring Me Men) (Junior Vasquez "Bring Me Men" Anthem Mix) − 9:59
4. Empires (Bring Me Men) (Illicit Siren Mix) − 8:55

== Charts ==
Weekly chart performance for Empires (Bring Me Men)
Chart (2002)	Peak position
US Hot Dance Music/Club Play (Billboard) Remix version	1
