= Life for Rent (song) =

2003 single by Dido

Single by Dido

from the album Life for Rent
- Released: 1 December 2003
- Studio: The Ark; The Church, Wessex (London, England); Cubejam (Miami, Florida, US)
- Length: 3:43
- Label: Arista, Cheeky
- Songwriters: Dido Armstrong, Rollo Armstrong
- Producers: Dido, Rollo

Dido singles chronology
"White Flag" (2003)	"Life for Rent" (2003)	"Don't Leave Home" (2004)

Music video
- "Life for Rent on YouTube

"Life for Rent" is the title track from English singer Dido's second studio album, Life for Rent (2003). The song was released as a single on 1 December 2003 and peaked at number eight on the UK Singles Chart. The song also became a top-40 hit in several other countries, including Hungary, Ireland, Italy, and the Netherlands. The music video, directed by Sophie Muller, shows Dido in several rooms in a house.

== Background and writing ==
Dido wrote "Life for Rent" whilst in the United States after what she described as "running away from England", citing various different reasons for her decision to go to the United States. When explaining her reasons for leaving England for the United States, she claimed that she had been getting excessive attention from journalists and British tabloid newspapers, and had just ended a relationship, factors which led to her decision to settle in the United States for a period of time. With much of the Life for Rent album, the song was written whilst in the United States, and cites Dido's desire to "always wanting to live by the sea", something she later claimed she "still wants to do sometimes, and sometimes I don't want to".

She explained that "Life for Rent" was written to reflect a meaning of her life not "really being my own", stating that she "only really rented my life for a while", further stating that "if I don't manage to buy it, to own it, then nothing of what I think is mine is really mine".

== Release ==
"Life for Rent" was released as the second single from Life for Rent on 1 December 2003, following "White Flag". :Life for Rent" peaked within the top 10 in the United Kingdom, Hungary, Croatia, Ireland and Italy, whilst in the Netherlands, New Zealand, Sweden and Switzerland, it reached the top 20. In the United Kingdom, it was certified silver by the British Phonographic Industry (BPI), indicating sales and streaming units in excess of 200,000.

Dido and her lyrical portrayal in "Life for Rent" was described as "moody and cynical as she examines her life", citing the differences between that and the "innocent and idealistic Dido" that was presented in her earlier releases such as "Thank You". Critics praised Dido's interpretation of lyrics, claiming that with "Life for Rent", she has "taken the limitations of her voice and made them strengths". Critics also claimed that Dido was "gradually reaching her potential", but highlighted that she "still had work to do". Since its release, "Life for Rent" has been credited as "capturing the hearts of listeners around the world with its introspective lyrics and unique blend of pop, trip-hop, and electronic elements". It's "evocative imagery and thought-provoking lyrics have sparked numerous interpretations, inviting listeners to delve deeper into the meanings and emotions" as claimed by one critic. Lyrically, the song features dark and thought provoking lyrics, such as "nothing I have is truly mine", in which critics and reviewers suggest highlights the "impermanent nature of all things in life, including possessions, relationships, and even our own bodies".

== Reception ==
In a retrospective review for Pitchfork, Shaad D'Souza named "Life for Rent" one of the weaker tracks in the album due to its composition, but "instructive in its outlook" reflecting themes associated with contemporary women's experiences, despite being labelled dismissively as "chick music", a slang term she links to chick flicks in cinema.

== Track listings ==
UK CD1

1. "Life For Rent" – 3:41
2. "White Flag" (Idjut Boys remix) – 3:45

UK CD2 and Australian CD single

1. "Life for Rent"
2. "Life for Rent" (Skinny 4 Rent mix)
3. "Stoned" (Spiritchaser mix)
4. "Life for Rent" (video)

== Credits and personnel ==
Credits are lifted from the UK CD2 liner notes and the Life for Rent booklet.

Studios

- Recorded at The Ark, The Church, Wessex Studios (London, England), and Cubejam (Miami, Florida, US)
- Mixed at The Church (London, England)
- Strings recorded at Angel Recording Studios (London, England)
- Mastered at Metropolis Studios (London, England)

Personnel

- Dido – writing (as Dido Armstrong), vocals, guitar, production
- Rollo – writing (as Rollo Armstrong), production
- Paul Herman – guitar
- Dave Randall – additional guitars
- Aubrey Nunn – bass
- Mark Bates – piano, keyboards, programming
- Andy Treacey – live drums
- P*Nut – drum programming
- Ash Howes – mixing, recording
- Phill Brown – recording
- Nick Ingman – string arrangement
- Gavyn Wright – concertmaster
- Miles Showell – mastering
- Simon Corkin – artwork design
- Ellen Von Unwerth – photography

== Charts ==
=== Weekly charts ===
Chart (2003–2004)	Peak position
Australia (ARIA)	28
Austria (Ö3 Austria Top 40)	31
Belgium (Ultratop 50 Flanders)	34
Belgium (Ultratop 50 Wallonia)	27
Croatia (HRT)	6
France (SNEP)	24
Germany (GfK)	33
Hungary (Rádiós Top 40)	10
Hungary (Single Top 40)	5
Ireland (IRMA)	8
Italy (FIMI)	8
Netherlands (Dutch Top 40)	11
Netherlands (Single Top 100)	24
New Zealand (Recorded Music NZ)	17
Romania (Romanian Top 100)	57
Scotland Singles (Official Charts)	7
Sweden (Sverigetopplistan)	20
Switzerland (Schweizer Hitparade)	19
UK Singles (Official Charts)	8

=== Year-end charts ===
Chart (2003)	Position
Ireland (IRMA)	88
UK Singles (OCC)	184

Chart (2004)	Position
Hungary (Rádiós Top 40)	44
Netherlands (Dutch Top 40)	61

== Certifications ==
Region	Certification	Certified units/sales
United Kingdom (BPI)	Silver	200,000^{‡}
^{‡} Sales+streaming figures based on certification alone.
