= Lamya =

Lamya Al-Mugheiry
- Born: Lamya Hafidh Sultan Al-Mugheiry; 30 October 1963; Mombasa, Kenya
- Died: 8 January 2009 (aged 45) Oman
- Genres: R&B; pop; dance; neo soul; trip hop; rock
- Occupations: Singer-songwriter; producer
- Years active: 1987–2009
- Label: J Records
- Website: Lamya's MySpace page

Lamya Al-Mugheiry (30 October 1963 – 8 January 2009), better known as her mononym Lamya, was a Kenyan-born English singer-songwriter and record producer. She rose to fame in the early 1990s as one of the lead singers of R&B group Soul II Soul, and later as a backing singer for Duran Duran. In 2002, she released her debut album Learning from Falling, which spawned the number 1 Dance chart single "Empires (Bring Me Men)".

On 8 January 2009, she died from a sudden heart attack. She was recording on her second album Hiding in Plain Sight, which was scheduled to be released later that year.

== Early life ==
Lamya Hafidh Sultan Al-Mugheiry was born in Mombasa, Kenya to Omani parents. Along with her parents, she lived in several cities around the world including Cairo and London. She was ultimately raised in Oman, then entered the American University in Cairo, Egypt, and later in Sheffield, United Kingdom. Her mother enrolled her in vocal lessons, training with a voice coach of the Metropolitan Opera. At the age of sixteen, she ran away from home to New York City to pursue her musical career, after watching a Madonna interview.

== Career ==
In 1989, she recorded the single "Break 4 Love" with DJ Vaughn Mason, originally by Raze. The single peaked at number 77 on the UK Singles Chart in August 1989. The song also garnered the attention of Soul II Soul's lead musician Jazzie B who asked her to join the group. In 1990, Lamya performed lead vocals on the songs "Love Come Through" and "In the Heat of the Night", which appeared on Soul II Soul's second album Vol. II: 1990 - A New Decade. Following the release of the album, she toured with the group throughout the year. One of their concerts at Brixton Academy was recorded live, titled A New Decade: Live from Brixton Academy, and released in September 1990. Despite leaving the group at the end of 1990, she still maintained a close relationship with the members.

In 1993, she teamed up with Duran Duran and performed background vocals on the song "Love Voodoo" for their second self-titled album Duran Duran. Lamya also joined them for their two-year Wedding Album tour, and related television appearances, including MTV Unplugged. During each concert, she was given centre stage to finish her solo on the song "Come Undone". In 1994, Lamya contributed background vocals for Charlotte Kelly's single "Queen of Hearts", which was produced by friend and her former group Soul II Soul member Jazzie B. In 1995, she contributed background vocals for Soul II Soul's album Volume V: Believe. She also sang background vocals "White Lines", "I Wanna Take You Higher", and "Drive By" for Duran Duran's album Thank You. Throughout the years, she also performed with David Bowie, Prince, and James Brown. In 2001, Lamya contributed background vocals on fellow Soul II Soul colleague Kym Mazelle's song "I Wanna Go Dancing (Dance With Me)".

In July 2002, Lamya released her debut album, Learning from Falling, which reached number 16 on Billboard's Top Heatseekers chart. She produced and composed the songs, using poems she had written since the age of eleven. It included the singles "Empires (Bring Me Men)" and "Black Mona Lisa". In its review of the album, Blender described her as "the Kenyan Björk". In 2003, she toured with Macy Gray, as the opening act. She was among the many singers scheduled to perform at Nelson Mandela's South African AIDS awareness concert before it was cancelled due to problems over broadcast rights and sponsorship.

== Death ==
Lamya was scheduled to release her second album, Hiding in Plain Sight in 2009, but died of a sudden and unexpected heart attack on 8 January 2009, while in Oman. She was 45 years old.

== Vocal style ==
Lamya was a classically trained soprano who had a five-octave vocal range with ability to reach the whistle register.

== Personal life ==
She was briefly in a relationship with Chic musician Nile Rodgers.

== Discography ==
=== Albums ===
Title	Album details	Peak chart positions
Title	Album details	US Heatseekers
Learning from Falling	Released: 30 July 2002; Label: J	16

=== Singles ===
Title	Year	Peak chart positions		Album
Title	Year	UK	US Dance	Album
"Ready 4 Love" (with Razette)	1989	77	—	Non-album single
"Survival" (with The Dawning)	1990	—	—	Non-album single
"Empires (Bring Me Men)"	2002	—	1	Learning from Falling
"Black Mona Lisa"	2002	—	—	Learning from Falling

== See also ==
- List of number-one dance hits (United States)
- List of artists who reached number one on the US Dance chart
