= The International School of Samui =

- โรงเรียนนานาชาติสมุย

Location
- Koh Samui; Thailand; 9.544545°N 100.045559°E

Information
- Type: Private international school
- Established: September 2006
- Grades: K–13
- Enrollment: 300

The International School of Samui (ISS; Thai: โรงเรียนนานาชาติสมุย, RTGS: Rong Rian Nana Chat Samui) is an international school on the island of Koh Samui in Thailand.

Its curriculum is structured in accordance with the National Curriculum of England. The majority of the teaching staff are British and are recruited from the UK. The sole language of instruction is English. The school has 300 students, both boys and girls from 3 to 18 years of age, currently enrolled from 35 countries. It is organised into 4 phases: Early Years, Primary School, Senior School and Sixth Form.

== History of International School of Samui ==
ISS was founded in 2007 under its old name of Bluewater by former Headmaster, Mr. Jeremy Lees, a UK Qualified Teacher, ISI International School Inspector and former British Army officer and helicopter pilot. As well as Mrs. Victoria Lees, a former MFL teacher. Mr Lees remains president of the board of governors.

== Accreditation ==
ISS is accredited by Education Development Trust (EDT) & International School's Quality Mark (ISQM), formally known as CfBT. ISS is an accredited Cambridge International Examinations Centre (CiE), Pearson EdExcel Examinations Centre, and member of ISAT (International Schools Association of Thailand).

== Houses ==
There are 3 houses in the Primary School named after mythical creatures:

- Phoenix (Red)
- Griffin (Blue)
- Pegasus (Green)

There are 2 houses in Senior School:

- Oxford (Oxford Blue) - Lincoln, Somerville and Trinity
- Cambridge (Cambridge Blue) - Darwin, Selwyn and Wolfson

Each house is led by a House Captain and all students are enrolled in the Houses. Competitions and activities are held throughout the year to win House trophies given at the end of the academic year on Speech Day.
