= End of Night (song) =

Single by Dido

from the album Girl Who Got Away
- Released: 5 May 2013
- Recorded: 2010–11
- Studio: Echo Studios (Los Angeles)
- Genre: Euro disco; synthpop
- Length: 3:58 (album version); 3:30 (JR single mix)
- Label: Sony Music Entertainment
- Songwriters: Dido Armstrong; Greg Kurstin
- Producer: Greg Kurstin

Dido singles chronology
"No Freedom" (2013)	"End of Night" (2013)	"Give You Up" (2019)

Music video
- "End of Night" on YouTube

"End of Night" is a song by English recording artist Dido. The song was released on 5 May 2013 as the second single from her fourth studio album Girl Who Got Away (2013). The song was written by Dido and Greg Kurstin.

== Music video ==
A lyric video for the song was uploaded to YouTube on 26 March 2013 at a total length of four minutes. On 9 April 2013 Dido tweeted that she was filming the music video for "End of Night". A music video to accompany the release of "End of Night" was first released onto YouTube on 28 April 2013 at a total length of three minutes and twenty-nine seconds.

=== Synopsis ===
The video starts with a shot of the mansion and then shows Dido sitting on a bed singing with an image of the man who represents the monster she has been able to rid herself of by ending the terror of the night. He appears normal but his monstrous face is revealed on one side when he turns. Just as she discovered his ugly side so she was trapped in the night of this darkened mansion. The video continues with others who are trapped in relationships where couples' dancing shows the torture they inflict on each other. She then leaves the mansion looking for an end to the night and for the light.

== Live performances ==
In April 2013 Dido performed "End of Night" for the first time live on German late-night television comedy talk show TV Total. On 23 April 2013, she performed the song live on the German television programme Morgenmagazin (de). On 30 April 2013, she performed the song live on British music television show Later... with Jools Holland.

== Track listing ==
Album version
No.	Title	Length
1.	"End of Night"	3:58

Digital download
No.	Title	Length
1.	"End of Night" (Radio Edit)	3:27
2.	"End of Night" (JR Mix)	3:40
3.	"End of Night" (Vince Clarke Remix)	6:03
4.	"End of Night" (Cedric Gervais Remix)	5:52

== Credits and personnel ==
- Written by Dido Armstrong and Greg Kurstin
- Produced by Greg Kurstin
- Mixed by Greg Kurstin
- Engineered by Greg Kurstin
- Additional engineering by Jessie Shatkin
- Recorded at Echo Studios, Los Angeles
- Vocals by Dido
- Keyboards and programming by Greg Kurstin
- Mastered by Tom Coyne at Sterling Sound

Credits adapted from Girl Who Got Away album liner notes.

== Charts ==
Chart (2013)	Peak position
Belgium (Ultratip Bubbling Under Flanders)	38
Belgium (Ultratip Bubbling Under Wallonia)	14
South Korea (Gaon International Chart)	18

== Release history ==
Region	Date	Format	Label
Australia	13 March 2013	Contemporary hit radio	Sony Music Entertainment
Italy	22 March 2013	Contemporary hit radio	Sony Music Entertainment
United Kingdom	5 May 2013	Digital download	RCA Records
