= Let Us Move On =

Promotional single by Dido featuring Kendrick Lamar

from the album Girl Who Got Away
- Released: 17 December 2012
- Recorded: 2012
- Studio: Enormous, Los Angeles; Ark
- Genre: Trip hop
- Length: 4:31
- Label: RCA
- Songwriters: Dido Armstrong; Rollo Armstrong; Kendrick Lamar; Jeff Bhasker; Pat Reynolds
- Producers: Dido; Rollo

Music video
- "Let Us Move On (lyric video)" on YouTube

"Let Us Move On" is a song by English singer Dido. It features the vocals from American rapper Kendrick Lamar. The song was released in the United Kingdom on 17 December 2012 as a promotional single from her fourth studio album Girl Who Got Away (2013).

The song was written by Kendrick Lamar, Dido Armstrong, Rollo Armstrong, Jeff Bhasker and Pat Reynolds. This song was also featured on Aimee Lagos's film No Good Deed, starring Taraji P. Henson and Idris Elba.

== Background ==
On Twitter, Dido talked about the meaning of the song saying "Just that life is long and bad times will pass x"

== Lyric video ==
A lyric video to accompany the release of "Let Us Move On" was first released onto YouTube on 18 December 2012 at a total length of four minutes and twenty-one seconds.

== Credits and personnel ==
- Written by Dido Armstrong, Rollo Armstrong, Jeff Bhasker, Kendrick Lamar and Pat Reynolds
- Produced by Rollo and Dido
- Mixed by Ash Howes, Rollo and Dido
- Engineered by Pawel Sek
- Recorded at Enormous Studios, LA and Ark Studios
- Vocals by Dido and Kendrick Lamar
- Background vocals by Jeff Bhasker
- All instruments performed by Jeff Bhasker
- Additional organ and bass by Ash Howes
- Drum programming by Plain Pat and Rollo
- Mastered by Tom Coyne at Sterling Sound

Credits adapted from Girl Who Got Away album liner notes.

== Chart performance ==
The song peaked at number 24 on the South Korea Gaon International Chart.

=== Weekly charts ===
Chart (2013)	Peak position
South Korea Gaon International Chart	24

== Release history ==
Region	Date	Format	Label
United Kingdom	17 December 2012	Digital download	RCA
