= Safe Trip Home =

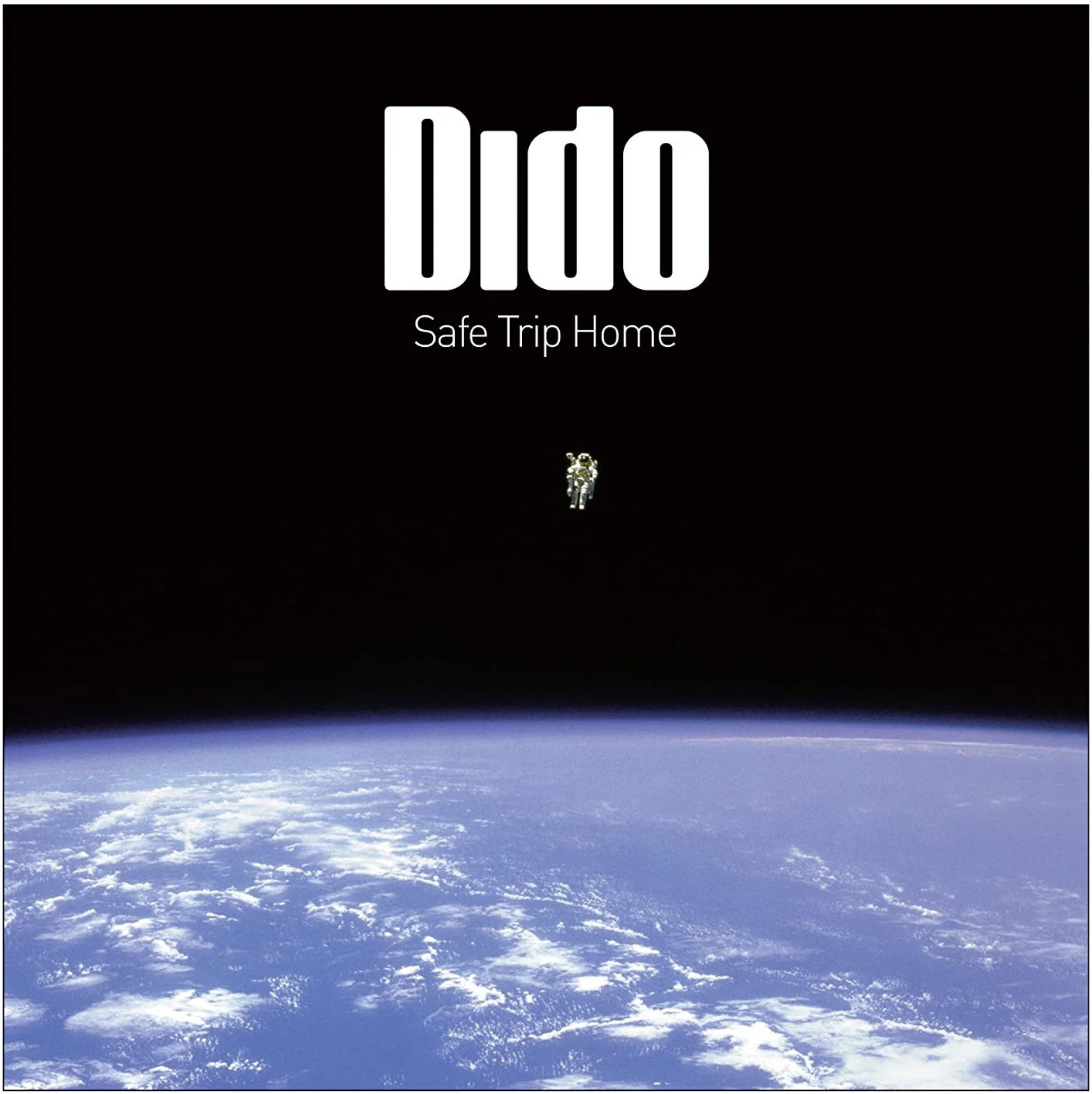

Studio album by Dido
- Released: 17 November 2008
- Recorded: 2005–2007
- Studios: London and Los Angeles at Ocean Way Recording, Westlake Recording Studios, Abbey Road Studios, Ocean Productions, Henson Recording Studios, NRG Recording Studios, British Grove Studios and various cupboards, kitchens and bedrooms
- Genres: Pop; trip hop
- Length: 49:47
- Labels: Arista; Cheeky; RCA; Sony BMG
- Producers: Dido; Jon Brion; The Ark

Dido chronology
Live at Brixton Academy (2005)	Safe Trip Home (2008)	Girl Who Got Away (2013)

Singles from Safe Trip Home
- 1. "Don't Believe in Love" Released: September 2008; 2. "Quiet Times" Released: February 2009

Safe Trip Home is the third studio album by Dido. It was released in the United Kingdom on 17 November 2008. The album features collaborations and production with Jon Brion, her brother Rollo Armstrong, Brian Eno, Mick Fleetwood, Citizen Cope and Questlove. The album was the 44th best-selling album worldwide of 2008, according to IFPI.

In the UK the album was certified gold. The album was nominated for a Grammy Award for Best Engineered Album, Non-Classical.

== Background ==
Dido began writing the album in 2005 when she moved to Los Angeles. The album was recorded at Jon Brion's home studio in Los Angeles, and the orchestra and bells were recorded at Abbey Road Studios in London. Dido met up with Brion at Abbey Road Studios in late 2005, and he was blown away by her musicianship. Much of the vocals were recorded inside a broom cupboard, at the suggestion of producer Brion. A variety of instruments were used during the recording of the album, some of which Dido learned to play, such as the drums, at the producer’s suggestion. She also played the recorder, her childhood instrument, on "Grafton Street", a track about her father's passing, who died from lupus in 2006, aged 68. Much of the album is about his passing.

During the making of the album, Dido took English and music classes in the evening at the University of California. She stated that she "went to study some orchestration stuff because I got so inspired working with all the orchestras" and "would go off a couple of evenings a week and come back to the studio completely fired and with my brain in a completely different place."

The album was mixed in 2007. At the time, the album was untitled.

Dido decided not to tour the album after doing a few shows due to being a "dark record" written about her father's passing. She said that she "realized when it came to [tour] I couldn't really sing the songs live because it was so raw at the time."

== Release ==
The album's cover artwork and track listing were revealed by Dido's official website on 5 September 2008. The album was originally due to be released on 3 November, but was delayed for two weeks due to manufacturing delays. In the UK, the album launch was heralded with a special listening party, which fans could win an invitation to through the Nectar loyalty card points scheme.

The album cover features a photograph of astronaut Bruce McCandless II during a spacewalk, as part of the 1984 Space Shuttle mission STS-41-B. Dido noted that this photo had been one of her favorites "for quite a few years" and that she imagined herself floating in space when she looked at it, adding that when it came to choosing the cover photo, there "wasn't too much rational thought that went into it, it was more of a sort of emotional thing." McCandless later sued Dido, Sony Music Entertainment and Getty Images over violating his publicity rights. The case was settled under undisclosed terms on 14 January 2011.

On 27 October 2008, it was announced that eleven short films were being produced to accompany the tracks on the album, based around the theme of home.

== Critical reception ==
Professional ratings
Aggregate scores
Source	Rating
Metacritic	74/100
Review scores
Source	Rating
AllMusic	4.5/5 stars
The A.V. Club	B−
Entertainment Weekly	B
The Guardian	3/5 stars
The Observer	4/5 stars
Q	4/5 stars
Rolling Stone	3.5/5 stars
Slant Magazine	3/5 stars
Spin	5/10
Sputnikmusic	3.5/5

The album received very positive reviews. Metacritic rates the album at 74 out of a 100. Stephanie Merritt from The Guardian wrote "This album is a mature and thoughtful collection of songs and a fine memorial to her father, who would have been right to be proud." While Chris Willman from Entertainment Weekly said "The emotion in these sad, subtle songs seems inherent enough, though you may still find yourself wishing she'd allowed the slightest hint of it to creep into her voice." Will Hermes of Rolling Stone said: "Dido's voice is so comforting, you almost miss the blues it conceals."

Sal Cinquemani of Slant Magazine gave a more critical review: "The album might be Dido's least adventurous to date, [with] her brand of vanilla soul going down like a warm cup of milk on tracks like the lead single "Don't Believe in Love" and "Quiet Times", the lyrics of which pretty much capture her overall state of mind: "My home is home and I'm settled now/I've made it through the restless phase." Though he noted that there was a "timeless quality to the songwriting and production." Elizabeth Goodman of Blender was also more critical. "The songs are ostensibly sad but [they are] as pleasant as a pile of warm, unfolded laundry. ...Dido should let her socks go unsorted for a while; genuine sorrow sounds good on her." Regardless of the album's late release in the year, it was ranked No. 50 in Q's 50 Best Albums of the Year 2008. In 2010, the album was nominated for the Grammy Award for Best Engineered Album, Non-Classical.

== Singles ==
Two singles were released from the album. On 22 August 2008, the day that the album's title was announced, the track "Look No Further" was released as a free digital download through her official website. The first official single from Safe Trip Home, "Don't Believe in Love", was released on 27 October 2008. It was also made available on iTunes stores internationally from 29 October. The second single, "Quiet Times", was released in February 2009.

== Track listing ==
Credits adapted from the album's liner notes.

Safe Trip Home – Standard edition
No.	Title	Writer(s)	Producer(s)	Length
1.	"Don't Believe in Love"	Dido Armstrong; Rollo Armstrong; Jon Brion	Brion	3:53
2.	"Quiet Times"	D. Armstrong	Dido; The Ark	3:17
3.	"Never Want to Say It's Love"	D. Armstrong; R. Armstrong; Brion	Brion	3:35
4.	"Grafton Street"	D. Armstrong; R. Armstrong; Brian Eno	Dido; The Ark	5:59
5.	"It Comes and It Goes"	D. Armstrong; R. Armstrong; Brion	Brion	3:28
6.	"Look No Further"	D. Armstrong; R. Armstrong; Brion	Brion	3:14
7.	"Us 2 Little Gods"	D. Armstrong; R. Armstrong; Rick Nowels; Daisy Gough	Dido; The Ark	4:49
8.	"The Day Before the Day"	D. Armstrong; R. Armstrong	Dido; The Ark	4:13
9.	"Let's Do the Things We Normally Do"	D. Armstrong; Brion	Brion	4:10
10.	"Burnin Love" (with Citizen Cope)	D. Armstrong; Clarence Greenwood	Dido; The Ark	4:12
11.	"Northern Skies"	D. Armstrong; R. Armstrong	Brion	8:57
Total length:				49:47

Safe Trip Home – Deluxe edition bonus tracks
No.	Title	Writer(s)	Producer(s)	Length
12.	"For One Day"	D. Armstrong	Dido; The Ark	5:43
13.	"Summer"	D. Armstrong	Dido; The Ark	3:55
14.	"Northern Skies" (Rollo & Sister Bliss remix)			5:53

Safe Trip Home – Deluxe edition enhanced section
No.	Title	Length
15.	"Dido Studio Film"
Total length:		11:19

== Personnel ==
Musicians

- Dido Armstrong – vocals, drums, guitar, omnichord, bells, additional keyboards, piano
- Mark Bates – programming, editing, keyboards, piano
- Jon Brion – keyboards, guitar, bass guitar, celeste, cello, additional percussion, drum machine
- Sister Bliss – keyboards, bass guitar, programming
- Brian Eno – additional keyboards
- Joel Shearer – additional guitar
- Sebastian Steinberg – bass guitar
- Justin Meldal-Johnsen – bass guitar
- Mick Fleetwood – drums
- Jim Scott – drums
- Questlove – drums
- Matt Chamberlain – drums, percussion
- Citizen Cope – drums, backing vocals, guitar on Burnin Love
- Lenny Castro – percussion
- David Campbell – string arranger (tracks 2, 4, 8), orchestra arranger and conductor (tracks 2, 4, 8)
- Gavyn Wright – session leader
- Eric Gorfain – orchestration
- Michael Price – orchestration
- Matt Robertson – orchestration

Production

- Chris Bolster – studio staff
- Jon Brion – mixer (track 3, 5, 6, 9, 11), orchestra arranger and conductor (tracks 1, 3, 5, 6, 9, 11)
- Nick Braun – studio staff
- Bobby Campbell – studio staff
- Eric Caudieux – programming/editing (tracks 1, 3, 4, 5, 6, 9, 11)
- Peter Edge – album mastering (at A&R)
- Isobel Griffiths – contractor
- Grippa – mixer (track 8)
- Kayt Jones – photographer
- Rouble Kapoor – studio staff
- Greg Koller – mixer (tracks 3, 5, 6, 9, 11)
- Peter Leak – manager
- Josh Newell – studio staff
- Alex Pavlides – studio staff
- Bret Rausch – studio assistant for Jon Brion
- Joanne Rooks – designer
- Jim Scott – mixer (track 2, 4, 7, 10), vocal and string mixer (track 8)
- Wesley Seidman – studio staff
- Paul Smith – studio staff
- Todd Steinhauer – assistant mixer (track 2, 4, 7, 10)
- Jill Streater – copyist
- Brady Woodcock – studio staff
- Alan Yoshida – album mastering (at Ocean Way)

== Charts ==
=== Weekly charts ===
Chart (2008)	Peak position
Australian Albums (ARIA)	6
Austrian Albums (Ö3 Austria)	11
Belgian Albums (Ultratop Flanders)	9
Belgian Albums (Ultratop Wallonia)	7
Canadian Albums (Billboard)	9
Croatian International Albums (HDU)	4
Danish Albums (Hitlisten)	20
Dutch Albums (Album Top 100)	8
European Albums (Billboard)	1
Finnish Albums (Suomen virallinen lista)	24
French Albums (SNEP)	3
German Albums (Offizielle Top 100)	3
Greek Albums (IFPI)	1
Hungarian Albums (MAHASZ)	15
Irish Albums (IRMA)	11
Italian Albums (FIMI)	11
New Zealand Albums (RMNZ)	6
Norwegian Albums (VG-lista)	18
Polish Albums (ZPAV)	14
Scottish Albums (Official Charts)	6
Spanish Albums (Promusicae)	27
Swedish Albums (Sverigetopplistan)	20
Swiss Albums (Schweizer Hitparade)	1
UK Albums (Official Charts)	2
US Billboard 200	13

=== Year-end charts ===
Chart (2008)	Position
Australian Albums (ARIA)	63
Belgian Albums (Ultratop Wallonia)	86
French Albums (SNEP)	52
Greek International Albums (IFPI)	14
Swiss Albums (Schweizer Hitparade)	43
UK Albums (OCC)	78

Chart (2009)	Position
Belgian Albums (Ultratop Wallonia)	70
European Albums (Billboard)	62
French Albums (SNEP)	138

== Certifications ==
Region	Certification	Certified units/sales
Australia (ARIA)	Gold	35,000^{^}
Belgium (BRMA)	Gold	15,000^{*}
France (SNEP)	Gold	75,000^{*}
Germany (BVMI)	Gold	100,000^{^}
Greece (IFPI Greece)	Gold	7,500^{^}
Hungary (MAHASZ)	Gold	3,000^{^}
Ireland (IRMA)	Gold	7,500^{^}
New Zealand (RMNZ)	Gold	7,500^{^}
Poland (ZPAV)	Gold	10,000^{*}
Switzerland (IFPI Switzerland)	Platinum	30,000^{^}
United Kingdom (BPI)	Gold	285,000
^{*} Sales figures based on certification alone.^{^} Shipments figures based on certification alone.
