= Quiet Times =

Single by Dido

from the album Safe Trip Home
- Released: 14 February 2009
- Genre: Pop
- Length: 3:17
- Label: Sony BMG
- Songwriter: Dido Armstrong
- Producers: Dido; The Ark

Dido singles chronology
"Don't Believe in Love" (2008)	"Quiet Times" (2009)	"It Comes and It Goes" (2009)

"Quiet Times" is a pop song performed by Dido, released as the second download-only single from her third studio album, Safe Trip Home, and the third single overall. The single was released exclusively in Australia and many Eastern European territories. The song has featured on the TV series' Ghost Whisperer, One Tree Hill and Grey's Anatomy.

== Track listing ==
Digital download

1. "Quiet Times" – 3:17

== Charts ==
Chart (2009)	Peak position
Czech Republic Airplay Chart	65
Russia Moscow Airplay Chart	70

== Release history ==
Region	Date	Format
Eastern Europe	14 February 2009	Digital download
Australia	18 February 2009	Digital download
