= Don't Believe in Love =

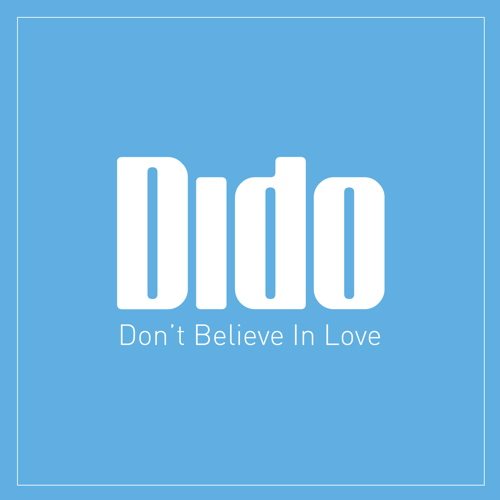

Single by Dido

from the album Safe Trip Home
- Released: 27 October 2008
- Genre: Pop
- Length: 3:53
- Label: Sony BMG
- Songwriters: Dido Armstrong, Rollo Armstrong, Jon Brion
- Producer: Jon Brion

Dido singles chronology
"Look No Further" (2008)	"Don't Believe in Love" (2008)	"Quiet Times" (2009)

Music video
- "Don't Believe in Love" on YouTube

"Don't Believe in Love" is a song performed by English singer-songwriter Dido. It is the only official single from her third studio album, Safe Trip Home, but the second single overall. It was released on 27 October 2008. "Don't Believe in Love (Objektivity Mix)" by Dennis Ferrer received a nomination for Best Remixed Recording, Non-Classical at the 52nd Annual Grammy Awards.

== Composition and release ==
According to Dido, "Don't Believe in Love" is not about a one-night stand situation as the lyrics might suggest. She explained, "I guess the basic concept is the world's a better place with love than it is without, but there's a whole lot of stuff to get to that point [...] The fact that I never truly explain what a song is about means that I feel very unlimited in what I put in. I think it is mainly journalists who want to work your life out from your songs". The song was premiered on radio stations on 1 September 2008, and was released for download in many European countries from 29 September 2008. It was also released in Australia on this date. The physical single was released in United Kingdom on 27 October 2008, and in Germany on 31 October 2008.

== Music video ==
The music video for the song was filmed in a ranch near Los Angeles, with AlexandLiane as the directors. The video was filmed in September 2008, and premiered on Dido's official YouTube account on 30 October 2008. The music video was available as a free download from the iTunes Store on 3 December 2008, as part of their 2008 "12 Days of Christmas" promotion.

== Track listing ==
1. "Don't Believe in Love" (Dido Armstrong, Rollo Armstrong, Jon Brion)
2. "Look No Further" (Dido Armstrong, Rollo Armstrong, Jon Brion)

== Live performances ==
- "Virgin Radio" Le 17/20 – Bruno Guillon & Camille Combal – 22 October 2008
- Live with Regis and Kelly – 7 November 2008
- The Tonight Show with Jay Leno – 10 November 2008
- "KLLC" – 12 November 2008
- The Ellen DeGeneres Show – 12 November 2008
- "Radio Cherie FM", France – 20 November 2008
- TV Total, Germany – 25 November 2008
- "Quelli Che Il Calcio E...", Italy – 14 December 2008
- "Radio RFM", France – 30 December 2008

== Charts ==
The song only peaked at No. 54 on the UK Singles Chart, making it her second lowest charting single to date, until No Freedom charted 5 places lower at 59 in 2013. The song peaked at No. 2 on the Italian Digital Singles Chart. The song has reached No. 20 on the Japan Hot 100. The song was also certified 2× Platinum in Italy.

Chart (2008–2009)	Peak position
Australian Physical Singles Chart	42
Austrian Singles Chart	29
Belgian Singles Chart Flanders	45
Belgian Singles Chart Wallonia	14
Hot Canadian Digital Singles	66
CIS Airplay (TopHit)	96
Dutch Top 40 Tipparade chart	16
Dutch Singles Chart	83
Greek Digital Singles Chart	4
Hungarian Singles Chart	9
Israeli Singles Chart	2
Italian Singles Chart	2
Japan Hot 100	20
Portuguese Singles Chart	1
Scottish Singles Chart	21
Slovak Airplay Chart	51
Swiss Singles Chart	16
UK Singles Chart	54

== Certification ==
Region	Certification	Certified units/sales
Italy (FIMI)	Platinum	36,973

== Popular culture ==
- "Don't Believe in Love" was featured in the fourth episode of 90210's first season, "The Bubble".
