= Don't Leave Home =

2004 single by Dido

Single by Dido

from the album Life for Rent
- B-side: "Stoned" (Deep Dish remix)
- Released: 10 April 2004
- Studio: The Ark; The Church, Wessex (London, UK); Cubejam (Miami, Florida)
- Length: 3:47
- Label: Cheeky; Arista
- Songwriters: Dido Armstrong; Rollo Armstrong
- Producers: Dido; Rollo; Mike Hedges

Dido singles chronology
"Life for Rent" (2003)	"Don't Leave Home" (2004)	"Sand in My Shoes" (2004)

Music video
- "Don't Leave Home" on YouTube

"Don't Leave Home" is the third single released from English singer Dido's second album, Life for Rent (2003). The song was first released as a digital download in various territories on 10 April 2004 before its physical UK release two days later. "Don't Leave Home" peaked at number 25 on the UK Singles Chart and charted for nine weeks. A remix of the song's B-side, "Stoned", by American electronic music duo Deep Dish topped the US Billboard Dance Club Play chart and received airplay in the Commonwealth of Independent States (CIS).

== Background ==
"Don't Leave Home" deals with drug addiction. It is written and sung from the point of view of the drug singing to the person who is addicted to it. It was originally a demo recorded for her 1999 album No Angel, but it was included instead on the 2003 album, Life for Rent. It was written and produced by Dido Armstrong and her brother Rollo Armstrong. The song is set in common time composed in a moderate tempo of 80 beats per minute, written in F♯ major with a vocal range from the tone of F♯_{4} to the note of C♯_{6}.

== Music video ==
The Jake Nava-directed music video for "Don't Leave Home" starts with the singer driving on a desert road as it gets dark. Suddenly, she finds herself in front of a forest. Dido leaves the car, drops her suitcase on the ground, and enters the forest. Some of the themes and scenery imply drug addiction, like the hazy affects, the forest filled with mushrooms and hallucinations of spiders and snakes. She leaves the forest and comes across a huge rock-like cliff by the ocean. She sings calmly by the cliff before jumping into the ocean and finds herself on a wide strand with white sand singing out to the ocean. The video ends with the car driving on with broken white lines. The video was shot in Cape Town, South Africa.

== "Stoned" ==
The B-side of the "Don't Leave Home" single, "Stoned", was released as a promotional single from Life for Rent. The song tells the story of an unwinding relationship, clouded through drugs. "Stoned" was remixed by Deep Dish; this version peaked at number one on the US Billboard Dance Club Play chart on the week dated 24 January 2004. At the end of 2004, Billboard ranked the remix as the second-most-successful dance club track of year. The song was also an airplay hit in the CIS, reaching number 28 on the global chart, number 35 in Russia, and number 18 in Ukraine.

== Track listings ==
UK CD single

1. "Don't Leave Home"
2. "Stoned" (Deep Dish Stoner remix edit)

European CD single

1. "Don't Leave Home" – 3:48
2. "Stoned" (Deep Dish remix edit) – 4:00
3. "Don't Leave Home" (video with lyrics)

== Credits and personnel ==
Credits are lifted from the "Don't Leave Home" UK CD single liner notes and the Life for Rent booklet.

Studios

- Recorded at The Ark, The Church, Wessex Studios (London, England), and Cubejam (Miami, Florida)
- Mixed at The Church (London, England)
- "Don't Leave Home" strings recorded at AIR Studios (London, England)
- Mastered at Metropolis Studios (London, England)

Artwork

- Simon Corkin – artwork design
- Bev Jones – photography

"Don't Leave Home" personnel

- Dido – writing (as Dido Armstrong), production
- Rollo – writing (as Rollo Armstrong), production
- Richard Parfitt – guitar
- Sister Bliss – additional keyboards, drum programming
- Makoto Sakamoto – drums
- Mike Hedges – production
- Matthieu Clouard – production assistance
- Ash Howes – mixing
- Phill Brown – recording
- Ger McDonnell – recording
- James Sanger – programming
- Mark Bates – programming assistance
- Pete Davies – programming assistance
- Nick Ingman – string arrangement
- Gavyn Wright – concertmaster
- Miles Showell – mastering

"Stoned" (Deep Dish remix) personnel

- Dido – writing (as Dido Armstrong), production
- Rollo – writing (as Rollo Armstrong), production
- Lester Mendez – writing, original recordings
- Adam Zimmon – acoustic guitar
- Carlos Paucer – percussion
- Sister Bliss – piano
- Mark Bates – additional keyboards, programming
- Ash Howes – mixing
- Phill Brown – recording
- Steve Sidelnyk – additional drum programming
- Deep Dish – remix and additional production (as Dubfire and Sharam), remix mixing
- Matt Nordstrom – remix mixing

== Charts ==
=== "Don't Leave Home" ===
==== Weekly charts ====
Chart (2004)	Peak position
Austria (Ö3 Austria Top 40)	54
Belgium (Ultratop 50 Flanders)	50
Belgium (Ultratip Bubbling Under Wallonia)	2
Canada AC Top 30 (Radio & Records)	15
Canada Hot AC Top 30 (Radio & Records)	12
CIS Airplay (TopHit)	102
Germany (GfK)	67
Greece (IFPI)	24
Hungary (Editors' Choice Top 40)	21
Ireland (IRMA)	35
Netherlands (Dutch Top 40)	36
Netherlands (Single Top 100)	38
Romania (Romanian Top 100)	29
Russia Airplay (TopHit)	106
Scotland Singles (OCC)	26
Switzerland (Schweizer Hitparade)	45
UK Singles (OCC)	25
US Adult Pop Airplay (Billboard)	22

==== Year-end charts ====
Chart (2004)	Position
US Adult Top 40 (Billboard)	64

=== "Stoned" (Deep Dish remix) ===
==== Weekly charts ====
Chart (2004)	Peak position
CIS Airplay (TopHit)	28
Russia Airplay (TopHit)	35
Ukraine Airplay (TopHit)	18
US Dance Club Songs (Billboard)	1

==== Year-end charts ====
Chart (2004)	Position
US Dance Club Play (Billboard)	2
Ukraine Airplay (TopHit)	184

== Release history ==
Region	Date	Format(s)	Label(s)	Ref(s).
Various	10 April 2004	Digital download	Cheeky; Arista	
United Kingdom	12 April 2004	CD	Cheeky; Arista	
United States	19 April 2004	Hot adult contemporary radio	Cheeky; Arista	
Sweden	3 May 2004	CD	Cheeky; Arista	

== See also ==
- List of number-one dance singles of 2004 (U.S.)
