= Life for Rent =

Studio album by Dido
- Released: 29 September 2003
- Studios: The Ark; The Church; Cubejam; Wessex Studios; AIR; Angel Recording Studios
- Genre: Folk-pop
- Length: 51:57
- Labels: Cheeky; Arista
- Producers: Dido; Rollo; Mike Hedges

Dido chronology
No Angel (1999)	Life for Rent (2003)	Live at Brixton Academy (2005)

Singles from Life for Rent
- 1. "White Flag" Released: 7 July 2003; 2. "Life for Rent" Released: 1 December 2003; 3. "Don't Leave Home" Released: 10 April 2004; 4. "Sand in My Shoes" Released: 23 August 2004

Life for Rent is the second studio album by English singer Dido, released by Arista Records on 29 September 2003. The album was produced by her brother Rollo Armstrong and American songwriter Rick Nowels. Work on the album began in mid-2002. It was certified 9× Platinum by the BPI, and sold over 12 million copies worldwide, making it the fourth best-selling album worldwide of 2003. The album became the seventh best-selling album of the 2000s in the United Kingdom, making Dido the only singer to have two albums in the top 10 list.

As of 2015, Life for Rent is the 34th best-selling album in UK chart history. In 2019 it was listed the 15th best-selling album of the 21st century in the UK.

== Composition ==
Life for Rent's first track and lead single "White Flag" begins with a lone synth-chord reminiscent of Sinéad O'Connor's "Nothing Compares 2 U". In the song, the protagonist is unwilling to give up on a relationship even though they know it is over. It features a "multi-layered" sound, delicate piano outro, and strings. In battle, a white flag signals surrender; by stating there will be "no white flag", she indicates she will not give up on the relationship. The second track "Stoned" has a dance vibe, bringing to mind David Bowie circa Outside (1995). The title track, "Life for Rent", has "emotional gravity" and a "graceful" melody. The song opens with an acoustic guitar, keeping the guitar in and giving the tune a hip hop beat. "Nothing I have is truly mine" she repeats at the conclusion. "Mary's in India" is a reflective song about a friend who moves abroad, as the title suggests, and the void her departure creates in those she leaves behind. The fifth track "See You When You're 40" is a somber and melodic ballad with a touch of symphonic air, featuring a "quasi" trip hop beat. "And I've seen, tonight, what I'd been warned about / I'm gonna leave, tonight, before I change my mind," she sings.

The sixth track "Don't Leave Home" sounds like Dido is picking herself up again although she speaks of shutting the blinds and closing the door, but she revealed that it is about drug addiction. The narrator of the song is the drug. Like a controlling lover, the drug takes over the user's life until he does not even want to leave home. "Who Makes You Feel" is a trip-pop, "soulful" and "tender" track. "Sand in My Shoes" talks about not having time, while the bridge has a dance-house feel. "Do You Have a Little Time" features lush strings and hip-hop back-beats. "This Land Is Mine" is a reflective piece that according to PopMatters, "could have Travis or Coldplay recording it with big grins on their faces. Simplistic and sparse, the song sounds just a bit like Olivia Newton-John in the early seventies, according to them. "See the Sun" sees Dido swoop in as saviour for a broken heart, which was described as a "mini-anthem that has all the right items in their proper places."

== Singles ==
"White Flag" was released as the lead single from the album on 7 July 2003 in the United States and on 1 September 2003 in the United Kingdom. The song was well received by critics who reviewed the album. It became a major worldwide hit, reaching number one in Australia and Europe. It peaked at number two in the United Kingdom, being held off the top spot by the Black Eyed Peas' "Where Is the Love?", and became her highest-charting single to date there. On the UK year-end chart for 2003, the song ranked at number 12. It peaked at number 18 on the Billboard Hot 100 and became her second top-20 single on the chart. It reached number two on the US Billboard Hot Adult Contemporary Tracks listing and stayed on the chart for 66 weeks. The song references a past relationship with Bob Page. In an interview with British newspaper The Sun, Dido said "the song is an apology to Page for breaking his heart. 'It was a big decision not to get married...'". The video featured the TV actor David Boreanaz. The song ranked on Blender's list "The 500 Greatest Songs Since You Were Born" at number 317. "Life for Rent" was released as the second single from the album on 1 December 2003. It peaked within the top ten in the UK Singles Chart and the Irish Singles Chart. The music video featured Dido singing in several rooms, and was directed by Sophie Muller.

"Don't Leave Home", written by Dido and her brother, was released as the third single via digital download on 10 April 2004, followed by a physical release two days later. The main theme of the song is the use of drugs, where the drugs "sing" to the consumer: "When I've been here for just one day / You'll already miss me if I go away / So close the blinds and shut the door / You won't need other friends anymore". The song debuted and peaked at number 25 in the UK. The track "Stoned" was remixed by Deep Dish and issued as the B-side to the single; this remix had previously reached number one on the Billboard Dance Club Play chart in January 2004. "Sand in My Shoes" was released as the fourth and final single from the album; in the US, it was serviced to radio on 23 August 2004, while in the UK, it was issued commercially on 13 September 2004. The song debuted and peaked at number 29 in the UK, and its remixes became another US club hit, reaching number one on the Billboard Dance Club Play chart.

== Critical reception ==
Professional ratings
Aggregate scores
Source	Rating
Metacritic	69/100
Review scores
Source	Rating
AllMusic	4/5 stars
Blender	4/5 stars
Entertainment Weekly	B
The Guardian	3/5 stars
Mojo	3.5/5 stars
NOW Magazine	2/5 stars
The Observer	2/5 stars
Pitchfork	7.6/10
Rolling Stone	3/5 stars
Slant Magazine	3/5 stars

According to review aggregator Metacritic, the album has received generally positive reviews, scoring 69 out of 100 points based on 12 reviews. Jason MacNeil, from PopMatters, gave a very positive review, finishing with: "this record seems to outweigh the previous album in terms of quality and depth". Alexis Petridis wrote "It would be nice to report that Dido's second album is strong enough to reveal her detractors as snobs, who hate the notion that her music appeals to 'ordinary' people ... Sadly, it proves a little more complicated than that".

Barry Walters of Rolling Stone declared "Like No Angel ... isn't groundbreaking, but it has its own kind of integrity. "Life for Rent doesn't offer anything that drastically different from Dido's debut album [No Angel], ... she's unassuming and gentle, but her songs are so melodic and atmospheric they easily work their way into the subconscious" was the review by Stephen Thomas Erlewine, from Allmusic. Andrew Lynch, from Entertainment.ie noted: "Life For Rent is no masterpiece, but it has the same kind of sweet, unassuming, girl-next-door charm that made its predecessor such a smash hit". Derryck Strachan, BBC Music reviewer wrote " ... she treads a fine line between credibility and popularity ... But, she hasn't put a foot wrong with this album. On the positive side that means more well-crafted folk-pop tunes, on the negative side she hasn't moved forward", also said "Although Dido played a significant part in older brother Rollo's band, ... Faithless, it would be misleading to say that the groups success brought her fame".

Mark Beaumont, writing for NME in 2016, included it on his list of eight of the all-time best-selling albums in the UK have no redeeming features whatsoever, dubbing it "just 54 minutes of mimsy maritime mithering crying out for Adele to come along and bellow Dido clean out of the charts forever."

== Commercial performance ==
Life for Rent was the fastest selling album by a woman recording artist, passing five million sales mark in just two weeks. It sold 102,500 on the first day, and 400,351 in the first week. According to the IFPI, it was the fourth best-selling album worldwide of 2003. Also, according to the BPI, Life for Rent was the best-selling album of 2003 in United Kingdom; and the seventh best-selling album between 2000 and 2009 in the country. The album spent ten weeks at the top of the UK albums chart. It remained on the chart for 54 weeks. Also, spent 18 non-consecutive weeks at number one on the European Top 100 Albums chart. In the United States, Life for Rent debuted and peaked at number four. By October 2003, the album had sold over a million and half copies. In Australia the album debuted at number one on the ARIA albums chart, being certified platinum (70,000) copies in its first week. It was one of the biggest selling albums of 2003 and went on to be certified six times platinum for sales of over 420,000. With this, Dido matched the huge success of her previous effort, No Angel. Dido's "Life for Rent Tour" was taken around the world in 2004. The album was nominated for "Best British Album" at the 2004 BRIT Awards along with Daniel Bedingfield's Gotta Get Thru This, Blur's Think Tank and The Coral's Magic and Medicine, but they were all beaten by The Darkness's Permission to Land. "White Flag" was awarded the 2004 Ivor Novello Award in the category International Hit of the Year. Also, in the same year, Life for Rent earned Dido's first Grammy nomination, at the 46th Grammy Awards, in the category Best Female Pop Vocal Performance for the song "White Flag".

== Track listing ==
Credits adapted from the album's liner notes.

All tracks produced by Dido and Rollo, except where noted.

No.	Title	Writer(s)	Length
1.	"White Flag"	Dido Armstrong; Rollo Armstrong; Rick Nowels	4:00
2.	"Stoned"	D. Armstrong; R. Armstrong; Lester Mendez	5:55
3.	"Life for Rent"	D. Armstrong; R. Armstrong	3:41
4.	"Mary's in India"	D. Armstrong; R. Armstrong	3:41
5.	"See You When You're 40"	D. Armstrong; R. Armstrong; Aubrey Nunn	5:20
6.	"Don't Leave Home" (Dido, Rollo, Mike Hedges)	D. Armstrong; R. Armstrong	3:46
7.	"Who Makes You Feel"	D. Armstrong; R. Armstrong; John "Pnut" Harrison	4:20
8.	"Sand in My Shoes"	D. Armstrong; Nowels	4:59
9.	"Do You Have a Little Time"	D. Armstrong; Nowels; Mark Bates	3:55
10.	"This Land Is Mine"	D. Armstrong; Nowels; R. Armstrong	3:46
11.	"See the Sun" (Dido, Rollo, Hedges)	D. Armstrong	5:05
12.	"Closer" (hidden track)	D. Armstrong; Nowels; R. Armstrong	3:29
Total length:			51:57

== Personnel ==
Credits adapted from the album's liner notes.

- Dido Armstrong – vocals
- Pauline Taylor – background vocals
- Rusty Anderson – guitar
- Dave Randall – guitar
- Richard J. Parfitt – guitar
- Rick Nowels – guitar, keyboards
- Adam Zimmon – acoustic guitar
- Paul Herman – acoustic guitar
- Aubrey Nunn – bass guitar
- Sister Bliss – keyboards, piano
- Mark Bates – harmonium, keyboards, percussion
- Carlos Paucar – percussion
- Mako Sakamoto – drums
- Andy Treacy – drums

Production

- Producers – D. Armstrong, Rollo Armstrong, R. Nowels
- Programmers – D. Armstrong, Sister Bliss, DJ Pnut, Steve Sidelynk

== Charts ==
=== Weekly charts ===
Chart (2003–2004)	Peak position
Australian Albums (ARIA)	1
Austrian Albums (Ö3 Austria)	2
Belgian Albums (Ultratop Flanders)	1
Belgian Albums (Ultratop Wallonia)	1
Canadian Albums (Billboard)	2
Czech Albums (ČNS IFPI)	6
Danish Albums (Hitlisten)	1
Dutch Albums (Album Top 100)	1
European Albums (Billboard)	1
Finnish Albums (Suomen virallinen lista)	3
French Albums (SNEP)	1
German Albums (Offizielle Top 100)	1
Greek Albums (IFPI)	1
Hungarian Albums (MAHASZ)	7
Irish Albums (IRMA)	1
Italian Albums (FIMI)	2
Japanese Albums (Oricon)	48
New Zealand Albums (RMNZ)	1
Norwegian Albums (VG-lista)	2
Polish Albums (ZPAV)	1
Portuguese Albums (AFP)	4
Scottish Albums (Official Charts)	1
South African Albums (RISA)	1
Spanish Albums (PROMUSICAE)	9
Swedish Albums (Sverigetopplistan)	1
Swiss Albums (Schweizer Hitparade)	1
UK Albums (Official Charts)	1
US Billboard 200	4

=== Year-end charts ===
Chart (2003)	Position
Australian Albums (ARIA)	11
Austrian Albums (Ö3 Austria)	11
Belgian Albums (Ultratop Flanders)	4
Belgian Albums (Ultratop Wallonia)	6
Belgian Alternative Albums (Ultratop Flanders)	1
Danish Albums (Hitlisten)	10
Dutch Albums (Album Top 100)	4
European Top 100 Albums (Billboard)	4
Finnish Albums (Suomen viralinen lista)	12
French Albums (SNEP)	8
German Albums (Offizielle Top 100)	12
Hungarian Albums (MAHASZ)	39
Irish Albums (IRMA)	2
Italian Albums (FIMI)	10
New Zealand Albums (RMNZ)	31
Swedish Albums (Sverigetopplistan)	9
Swedish Albums & Compilations (Sverigetopplistan)	13
Swiss Albums (Schweizer Hitparade)	2
UK Albums (OCC)	1
US Billboard 200	92
Worldwide Albums (IFPI)	4

Chart (2004)	Position
Australian Albums (ARIA)	12
Austrian Albums (Ö3 Austria)	23
Belgian Albums (Ultratop Flanders)	10
Belgian Albums (Ultratop Wallonia)	29
Belgian Alternative Albums (Ultratop Flanders)	3
Danish Albums (Hitlisten)	42
Dutch Albums (Album Top 100)	4
European Top 100 Albums (Billboard)	4
French Albums (SNEP)	42
German Albums (Offizelle Top 100)	8
Hungarian Albums (MAHASZ)	80
Italian Albums (FIMI)	50
New Zealand Albums (RMNZ)	16
Swedish Albums (Sverigetopplistan)	78
Swiss Albums (Schweizer Hitparade)	9
UK Albums (OCC)	30
US Billboard 200	48

Chart (2005)	Position
Belgian Midprice Albums (Ultratop Flanders)	34
Belgian Midprice Albums (Ultratop Wallonia)	46

=== Decade-end charts ===
Chart (2000s)	Position
Australian Albums (ARIA)	16
UK Albums (OCC)	7

== Certifications and sales ==
Region	Certification	Certified units/sales
Argentina (CAPIF)	Platinum	40,000^{^}
Australia (ARIA)	6× Platinum	420,000^{^}
Austria (IFPI Austria)	Platinum	30,000^{*}
Belgium (BRMA)	3× Platinum	150,000^{*}
Brazil (Pro-Música Brasil)	Gold	50,000^{*}
Canada (Music Canada)	3× Platinum	300,000^{^}
Czech Republic	—	20,000
Denmark (IFPI Danmark)	Platinum	40,000^{^}
Finland (Musiikkituottajat)	Gold	17,485
France (SNEP)	2× Platinum	600,000^{*}
Germany (BVMI)	3× Platinum	600,000^{^}
Greece (IFPI Greece)	Gold	10,000^{^}
Hungary (MAHASZ)	Gold	10,000^{^}
Mexico (AMPROFON)	Gold	50,000^{^}
Netherlands (NVPI)	Platinum	80,000^{^}
New Zealand (RMNZ)	4× Platinum	60,000^{^}
Norway (IFPI Norway)	2× Platinum	80,000^{*}
Poland (ZPAV)	Gold	35,000^{*}
Portugal (AFP)	Gold	30,000
Russia (NFPF)	Platinum	20,000^{*}
South Africa (RISA)	Platinum	50,000^{*}
Spain (Promusicae)	Gold	50,000^{^}
Sweden (GLF)	Platinum	60,000^{^}
Switzerland (IFPI Switzerland)	3× Platinum	120,000^{^}
United Kingdom (BPI)	9× Platinum	2,900,000
United States (RIAA)	2× Platinum	2,100,000
Summaries
Europe (IFPI)	5× Platinum	5,000,000^{*}
Worldwide	—	12,000,000
^{*} Sales figures based on certification alone.^{^} Shipments figures based on certification alone.

== See also ==
- List of best-selling albums by women
- List of UK Albums Chart number ones of the 2000s
- List of best-selling albums of the 2000s (decade) in the United Kingdom
- List of best-selling albums of the 2000s (century) in the United Kingdom
- Live at Brixton Academy (Dido album)
