= White Flag (Dido song) =

Song by English singer-songwriter Dido

Single by Dido

from the album Life for Rent
- B-side: "Paris"; "Don't Leave Home"
- Released: 7 July 2003
- Studio: The Church (London, England)
- Genre: Pop
- Length: 4:01 (album version); 3:40 (radio edit)
- Label: Arista; Cheeky
- Songwriters: Dido Armstrong; Rick Nowels; Rollo Armstrong
- Producers: Dido; Rollo

Dido singles chronology
"Feels Like Fire" (2003)	"White Flag" (2003)	"Life for Rent" (2003)

Music video
- "White Flag" on YouTube

"White Flag" is a song by English singer-songwriter Dido, released as the lead single from her second studio album, Life for Rent (2003). The song was first released to US radio on 7 July 2003 and was issued in the United Kingdom as a physical single on 1 September 2003. The song performed well on record charts around the world, peaking at number one in Australia, Austria, the Czech Republic, Germany, Italy, Norway, and Portugal. In Dido's native UK, it reached number two on the UK Singles Chart, and in the United States, it climbed to number 18 on the Billboard Hot 100.

The song's music video, directed by Joseph Kahn, features actor David Boreanaz as Dido's love interest. "White Flag" was nominated for the Best Female Pop Vocal Performance at the 46th Grammy Awards but lost to Christina Aguilera's "Beautiful". It won the Best British Single at the 2004 Brit Awards. "White Flag" ranked at number 317 on Blender's list "The 500 Greatest Songs Since You Were Born".

== Background and composition ==
"White Flag" was written and produced by Dido, Rick Nowels, and Rollo Armstrong. In the song, the protagonist is unwilling to give up, even if she knows her relationship is over. Dido has stated the song was inspired by a real break-up she had with a former fiancé.

"White Flag" features "multi-layered" sound, delicate piano outro, and strings. The song's verses are in D minor, (Note: Specifically, D natural minor or D Aeolian, with a dominant chord of A minor.) but the chorus and bridge are in the relative F major. The tempo is 90 beats per minute, and Dido's vocals range from the low note of A_{3} to the high note of C_{5}.

== Release ==
=== Critical reception ===
David Jeffries from AllMusic praised "Dido's sweet delivery" and stated that "It’s all very beautiful, the perfect soundtrack for weeping, and the definition of "wistful" in a song." Derryck Strachan wrote for BBC Music that the song is "engaging to the extent that you could easily be humming along without it registering in your brain. There's something unconscious, pleasantly innocuous about it. It's comfort food for the ears and it could be easily on a Tom Hanks–Meg Ryan romantic comedy." Alexis Petridis from The Guardian wrote that the song "is a superb, confidently written pop song, possessed of a chorus that is impossible to dislodge from your memory without the aid of hypnotherapy."

=== Awards and legacy ===
The song was nominated for Best Female Pop Vocal Performance at the 2004 Grammy Awards, but lost to Christina Aguilera's "Beautiful". The song won the award for "Best Single" at the 2004 BRIT Awards.

=== Music video ===
The music video, directed by Joseph Kahn, was filmed in Cape Town, South Africa and features actor David Boreanaz as Dido's love interest. The video tells a story about a relationship that is over, but where Dido is obviously still smitten with her ex, who is oblivious of her. They have numerous occasions where they are near each other without him noticing. Dido is clearly still not over him, and he is clearly not over her. At the end of the video, they return to their apartments and Dido's room is filled with photos of him and, in a twist ending, his apartment is also filled with Dido's photos (showing he is still as much in love with her as well). The screen rotates throughout the entirety of the video, never standing still. The song's opening is also cut out entirely from the video.

== Track listings ==
European and Japanese CD single

1. "White Flag" – 3:58
2. "Paris" – 3:23

European 12-inch single

A. "White Flag" (Beginnerz remix) – 7:33
B. "White Flag" (Version Idjut) – 7:12

US 7-inch single

A. "White Flag" – 4:00
B. "Don't Leave Home" – 3:46

Australian CD single

1. "White Flag"
2. "Paris"
3. "White Flag" (Johnny Toobad mix)

== Credits and personnel ==
Credits are lifted from the European CD single liner notes.

Studios

- Recorded and mixed at The Church (London, England)
- Additional recording at The Ark
- Strings recorded at Angel Recording Studios (London, England)
- Mastered at Metropolis Studios (London, England)

Personnel

- Dido – writing (as Dido Armstrong), vocals, production
- Rick Nowels – writing, guitar, keyboards
- Rollo – writing (as Rollo Armstrong), production
- Paul Herman – additional acoustic guitar
- Rusty Anderson – electric guitar
- Mark Bates – additional keyboards, piano, programming
- P*Nut – drums and bass programming
- Ash Howes – recording, mixing
- Grippa – additional recording
- Gavin Callaghan – recording assistance
- Nathan Loughran – recording assistance
- Nick Ingman – string arrangement
- Gavyn Wright – concertmaster
- Miles Showell – mastering
- Simon Corkin – artwork design
- Ellen Von Unwerth – photography

== Charts ==
=== Weekly charts ===
Chart (2003–2004)	Peak position
Australia (ARIA)	1
Austria (Ö3 Austria Top 40)	1
Belgium (Ultratop 50 Flanders)	3
Belgium (Ultratop 50 Wallonia)	2
Canada (Nielsen SoundScan)	26
Canada AC Top 30 (Radio & Records)	2
Canada CHR (Nielsen BDS)	13
Canada Hot AC Top 30 (Radio & Records)	23
CIS Airplay (TopHit)	31
Croatia International Airplay (Top lista)	1
Czech Republic (ČNS IFPI)	1
Denmark (Tracklisten)	2
Europe (Eurochart Hot 100)	1
Finland (Suomen virallinen lista)	19
France (SNEP)	5
Germany (GfK)	1
Greece (IFPI)	8
Hungary (Rádiós Top 40)	1
Hungary (Single Top 40)	3
Ireland (IRMA)	2
Italy (FIMI)	1
Netherlands (Dutch Top 40)	4
Netherlands (Single Top 100)	5
New Zealand (Recorded Music NZ)	12
Norway (VG-lista)	1
Portugal (AFP)	1
Romania (Romanian Top 100)	9
Russia Airplay (TopHit)	23
Scotland Singles (Official Charts)	2
Spain (Promusicae)	11
Sweden (Sverigetopplistan)	2
Switzerland (Schweizer Hitparade)	2
UK Singles (Official Charts)	2
Ukraine Airplay (TopHit)	70
US Billboard Hot 100	18
US Adult Alternative Airplay (Billboard)	16
US Adult Contemporary (Billboard)	2
US Adult Pop Airplay (Billboard)	4
US Dance Airplay (Billboard)	9
US Pop Airplay (Billboard)	19

Chart (2025)	Peak position
Israel International Airplay (Media Forest)	11

=== Year-end charts ===
Chart (2003)	Position
Australia (ARIA)	78
Austria (Ö3 Austria Top 40)	13
Belgium (Ultratop 50 Flanders)	25
Belgium (Ultratop 50 Wallonia)	30
CIS Airplay (TopHit)	39
Europe (Eurochart Hot 100)	4
France (SNEP)	47
Germany (Media Control GfK)	12
Ireland (IRMA)	8
Italy (FIMI)	9
Netherlands (Dutch Top 40)	10
Netherlands (Single Top 100)	24
New Zealand (RIANZ)	27
Russia Airplay (TopHit)	25
Sweden (Hitlistan)	16
Switzerland (Schweizer Hitparade)	5
UK Singles (OCC)	12
Ukraine Airplay (TopHit)	124
US Adult Top 40 (Billboard)	23

Chart (2004)	Position
Hungary (Rádiós Top 40)	2
US Billboard Hot 100	36
US Adult Contemporary (Billboard)	1
US Adult Top 40 (Billboard)	14
US Dance Radio Airplay (Billboard)	19
US Mainstream Top 40 (Billboard)	70

Chart (2005)	Position
Hungary (Rádiós Top 40)	30

Chart (2025)	Position
Estonia Airplay (TopHit)	200

== Certifications ==
Region	Certification	Certified units/sales
Australia (ARIA)	Gold	35,000^{^}
Austria (IFPI Austria)	Gold	15,000^{*}
Belgium (BRMA)	Gold	25,000^{*}
Denmark (IFPI Danmark)	Gold	4,000^{^}
Denmark (IFPI Danmark) Reissue	Gold	45,000^{‡}
Germany (BVMI)	Gold	150,000^{^}
Italy (FIMI) sales since 2009	Gold	35,000^{‡}
New Zealand (RMNZ)	2× Platinum	60,000^{‡}
Norway (IFPI Norway)	Platinum	10,000^{*}
Spain (Promusicae)	Platinum	60,000^{‡}
Sweden (GLF)	Gold	10,000^{^}
Switzerland (IFPI Switzerland)	Gold	20,000^{^}
United Kingdom (BPI)	2× Platinum	1,200,000^{‡}
United States (RIAA)	Gold	500,000^{*}
^{*} Sales figures based on certification alone.^{^} Shipments figures based on certification alone.^{‡} Sales+streaming figures based on certification alone.

== Release history ==
Region	Date	Format(s)	Label(s)	Ref(s).
United States	7 July 2003	Hot adult contemporary; triple A radio	Arista; Cheeky	
United States	11 August 2003	Contemporary hit radio	Arista; Cheeky	
Denmark	1 September 2003	CD	Arista; Cheeky	
United Kingdom	1 September 2003	CD	Arista; Cheeky	
Japan	3 September 2003	CD	Arista; BMG Japan	
Sweden	3 September 2003	CD	Arista; Cheeky	
Australia	15 September 2003	CD	Arista; Cheeky	
