= Robert Miles discography =

- Studio albums: 5
- EPs: 2
- Compilation albums: 4
- Singles: 13

The discography of Italian dance music composer Robert Miles comprises five studio albums, four compilation albums, two extended plays, and thirteen singles.

== Albums ==
=== Studio albums ===
Title	Release	Peak chart positions											Certifications
Title	Release	ITA	AUS	FIN	FRA	GER	NED	NZ	SWE	SWI	UK	US	Certifications
Dreamland	Released: 10 June 1996; Label: DBX, Format: CD, CS, digital download, vinyl	8	12	8	6	2	19	3	6	2	7	54	ARIA: Gold; IFPI SWI: Platinum; BPI: Platinum; BVMI: Platinum; MC: Platinum; RIAA: Gold; RMNZ: Platinum; SNEP: 2× Gold
23am	Released: 1 December 1997; Label: DBX, Format: CD, CS, digital download, vinyl	—	—	—	—	69	—	—	—	18	42	—	
Organik	Released: 11 June 2001; Label: Salt; Format: CD, digital download, vinyl	—	—	—	—	—	—	—	—	—	—	—	
Miles_Gurtu (with Trilok Gurtu)	Released: 10 February 2004; Label: Salt; Format: CD, digital download	—	—	—	—	—	—	—	—	—	—	—	
Thirteen	Released: 7 February 2011; Label: Salt; Format: CD, digital download	—	—	—	—	—	—	—	—	—	—	—	
"—" denotes items that did not chart or were not released in that territory.

=== Compilation albums ===
Title	Release	Peak chart positions
Title	Release	GER
In the Mix	Released: 25 March 1997; Label: Urban; Format: CD, CS	65
Renaissance Worldwide: London (with Dave Seaman)	Released: 14 April 1997; Label: 404 Music Group; Format: CD	—
Organik Remixes	Released: 18 November 2002; Label: Salt; Format: CD, digital download	—
Remember Robert Miles	Released: 23 October 2017; Label: Smilax Records; Format: CD, digital download	—
"—" denotes items that did not chart or were not released in that territory.

== Extended plays ==
Title	Release
Oxygen E.P. Vol. 1 (as Roberto Milani)	Released: 1995; Label: Metrotraxx; Format: 12"
Soundtracks...	Released: 1995; Label: DBX Records; Format: 12"

== Singles ==
List of singles, with selected chart positions and certifications, showing year released and album name
Title	Year	Peak chart positions											Certifications	Album
Title	Year	ITA	AUS	FIN	FRA	GER	NED	NZ	SWE	SWI	UK	US	Certifications	Album
"Ghost" (as Roberto Milani)	1994	—	—	—	—	—	—	—	—	—	—	—		non-album single
"Outbreak" (as Roberto Milani)	1995	—	—	—	—	—	—	—	—	—	—	—		non-album single
"Red Zone"	1995	—	—	—	—	—	—	—	—	—	—	—		Dreamland
"Children"	1995	1	5	1	1	1	3	4	1	1	2	21	IFPI SWI: Platinum; ARIA: Gold; BPI: 3× Platinum; BVMI: Platinum; GLF: Gold; NVPI: Gold; RMNZ: Platinum; SNEP: Platinum	Dreamland
"Fable"	1996	1	21	2	10	3	16	20	11	3	7	—	SNEP: Silver	Dreamland
"One and One" (featuring Maria Nayler)	1996	1	56	8	16	5	24	—	3	6	3	54	BPI: Gold; BVMI: Gold; GLF: Gold	Dreamland
"Freedom" (featuring Kathy Sledge)	1997	3	—	17	—	75	—	47	59	41	15	—		23am
"Full Moon"	1998	—	—	—	—	—	—	—	—	—	—	—		23am
"Everyday Life"	1998	—	—	—	—	—	—	—	—	—	—	—		23am
"Paths" (featuring Nina Miranda)	2001	—	—	—	—	—	—	—	—	—	74	—		Organik
"Improvisations: Part 2"	2002	—	—	—	—	—	—	—	—	—	—	—		Organik
"Connections"	2002	—	—	—	—	—	—	—	—	—	—	—		Organik
"Miniature World"	2011	—	—	—	—	—	—	—	—	—	—	—		Thirteen
"—" denotes items that did not chart or were not released in that territory.
