= Seven Days and One Week =

Single by B.B.E.

from the album Games
- B-side: "Hypnose"
- Released: 9 July 1996
- Genre: Dream house
- Length: 4:31 (radio edit); 8:27 (club mix)
- Label: Triangle
- Songwriters: Bruno Sanchioni; Bruno Quartier
- Producer: Emmanuel Top

B.B.E. singles chronology
"Seven Days and One Week" (1996)	"Flash" (1997)

Music video
- "Seven Days and One Week" on YouTube

"Seven Days and One Week" is a song by Italian-French electronic music act B.B.E. It was released in July 1996 by Triangle Records as the lead single from their debut album, Games (1998). As a representative of the short-lived dream house sound, the song became a top 10 hit worldwide, most notably reaching number-one in Spain, number two in Belgium, Finland, Ireland and Italy, and number three in Germany, the Netherlands and the United Kingdom. On the Eurochart Hot 100, it also peaked at number three. The accompanying music video was directed by Martin Weisz.

== Critical reception ==
James Hyman from Music Week's RM Dance Update gave the song a full score of five out of five, declaring it an "obvious dreamhouse successor" to Robert Miles' 'Children'. He added, "With its 'Shinny/Elevator' pace, jolting stabs, rapid rolls and tinkly piano, Emmanuel Top and the Italian Bruno duo, who are no strangers to this style ('Age of Love'), have created a trump (trouser) trancer. Previously top five in Germany and number one in Spain, expect to see this in a UK Top 10 chart near you soon."

== Music video ==
The music video for "Seven Days and One Week" was directed by German music video and film director Martin Weisz.

== Impact and legacy ==
In 1998, DJ Magazine ranked "Seven Days and One Week" number 63 in their list of "Top 100 Club Tunes". In 2014, Jeffrey Sutorius from Dutch electronic music group Dash Berlin ranked the song at number four in his list of "Dash Berlin's Top Five Trance Classics". He said:

I remember when this track came out on Triangle Records. I believe it was around 1996. The production was really clean for that time and the saw tooth synth lead was really basic, but the record did really well on the dance floor. It has been remixed and rereleased many times, but still nothing comes close to the original. There are a lot of trance records from that time that sampled that typical reversed crash cymbal, but I believe BBE were the first to do it.

== Track listing ==
- CD maxi - Europe (1996)
1. "Seven Days and One Week" (Radio Mix) - 4:30
2. "Seven Days and One Week" (Club Mix) - 8:20
3. "Hypnose" - 5:15
- File, MP3 - UK (2018)
1. "Seven Days and One Week" (Yotto Extended Mix) - 7:59

== Charts ==
=== Weekly charts ===
Chart (1996)	Peak position
Australia (ARIA)	19
Austria (Ö3 Austria Top 40)	8
Belgium (Ultratop 50 Flanders)	3
Belgium (Ultratop 50 Wallonia)	2
Canada Dance/Urban (RPM)	3
Denmark (Tracklisten)	6
Europe (Eurochart Hot 100)	3
Europe (European Dance Radio)	6
Europe (European Hit Radio)	28
Europe Border Breakers (Music & Media)	1
Finland (Suomen virallinen lista)	2
France (SNEP)	6
France Airplay (SNEP)	18
Germany (GfK)	3
Hungary (Single Top 40)	25
Iceland (Íslenski Listinn Topp 40)	11
Ireland (IRMA)	2
Israel (Israeli Singles Chart)	12
Italy (Musica e dischi)	2
Netherlands (Dutch Top 40)	3
Netherlands (Single Top 100)	4
Norway (VG-lista)	6
Scottish Singles Sales (Official Charts)	2
Spain (AFYVE)	1
Sweden (Sverigetopplistan)	4
Sweden (Swedish Dance Chart)	3
Switzerland (Schweizer Hitparade)	8
UK Singles (Official Charts)	3
UK Dance (Official Charts)	1
UK Airplay (Music Week)	21
UK Pop Tip Club Chart (Music Week)	37

=== Year-end charts ===
Chart (1996)	Position
Belgium (Ultratop 50 Flanders)	34
Belgium (Ultratop 50 Wallonia)	24
Europe (Eurochart Hot 100)	18
Germany (Media Control)	18
Netherlands (Dutch Top 40)	64
Netherlands (Single Top 100)	57
Sweden (Topplistan)	49
Sweden (Swedish Dance Chart)	15
Switzerland (Schweizer Hitparade)	43
UK Singles (OCC)	55

Chart (1997)	Position
Canada Dance/Urban (RPM)	24
UK Club Chart (Music Week)	1

== Certifications ==
Region	Certification	Certified units/sales
France (SNEP)	Silver	125,000^{*}
Germany (BVMI)	Gold	250,000^{^}
United Kingdom (BPI)	Silver	200,000^{^}
^{*} Sales figures based on certification alone.^{^} Shipments figures based on certification alone.
