= Flash (B.B.E. song) =

1997 single by B.B.E.

Single by B.B.E.

from the album Games
- B-side: "Photo"
- Released: 27 January 1997 • 14 June 2024 (Digital Streaming)
- Genre: Dream trance
- Length: 3:58
- Label: Triangle • Armada Music
- Songwriter: Bruno Sanchioni
- Producer: Emmanuel Top

B.B.E. singles chronology
"Seven Days and One Week" (1996)	"Flash" (1997)	"Desire" (1997)

"Flash" is a song by Italian-French Eurodance act B.B.E. It was released in January 1997 as the second single from their debut album, Games (1998). As a representative of the short-lived dream dance sound, the song became a top 20 hit worldwide, most notably reaching number six in Spain, and number five in the United Kingdom.

== Critical reception ==
Chris Finan from Music Week's RM rated the track five out of five, writing, "To be perfectly honest, before I heard this I was expecting a duplicate '7 Days', no-questions-asked-get-ready-to-cringe commercial rip-off. But no, 'Flash' is a cracking hard-edged synth monster that really does kick in. The arrangement is quite simple really - a slightly similar beat ettect to the last release built up by basic repetitive keyboard lines planned between the peaceful breaks, which sums up the Club mix completely. The Extended mix leans towards full-on and is more ferocious at the start, and is probably what the chartbound version will be hased on. A huge pat on the back for coming up with something equally as good."

== Track listing ==
- CD maxi - Europe (1997)
1. "Flash" (Radio Mix) - 3:58
2. "Flash" (Club Mix) - 7:51
3. "Photo" (Club Mix) - 6:00

== Charts ==
=== Weekly charts ===
Chart (1997)	Peak position
Australia (ARIA)	85
Austria (Ö3 Austria Top 40)	18
Belgium (Ultratop 50 Flanders)	20
Belgium (Ultratop 50 Wallonia)	17
Europe (Eurochart Hot 100)	8
Finland (Suomen virallinen lista)	8
France (SNEP)	12
Germany (GfK)	11
Ireland (IRMA)	15
Israel (Israeli Singles Chart)	22
Italy (Musica e dischi)	9
Netherlands (Dutch Top 40)	28
Netherlands (Single Top 100)	43
Norway (VG-lista)	16
Scottish Singles Sales (Official Charts)	3
Spain (AFYVE)	6
Sweden (Sverigetopplistan)	14
Switzerland (Schweizer Hitparade)	21
UK Singles (Official Charts)	5
UK Dance (Official Charts)	2

=== Year-end charts ===
Chart (1997)	Position
Europe (Eurochart Hot 100)	77
UK Singles (OCC)	171
