= Emmanuel Top =

French acid techno music producer (born 1971)

- Born: 30 October 1971 (age 54)
- Origin: Tourcoing, France
- Genres: New beat, Dream trance, acid techno, chill-out
- Occupations: Composer, record producer, musician, DJ
- Years active: 1993–present

Emmanuel Top (born 30 October 1971) is a French acid techno music producer. He was popular in the 1990s for his releases on his own record label, Attack Records, he began his career at the end of the 1980s in full wave New beat on the Belgian label DIKI Records, under the pseudonym Bazz with Bruno Sanchioni of Age of Love.

His most famous track is entitled "Acid Phase". Released in 1995, the title was further popularised by Kai Tracid, whose cover "Acid Phase (Kai Tracid Remix)" was regularly featured as a video on, inter alia, MTV those days. Another very popular song is "Turkish Bazar", released in 1994, which contains warped, looping vocal lyrics, originally performed by Jim Morrison in the song "Black Polished Chrome" by The Doors: "The music was new black polished chrome and came over the summer like liquid night." The track contains a sweeping acid bass line using the Roland TB-303 synthesizer and punchy TR-909 kicks.

In 1996, as part of the group B.B.E., he charted two top 5 hits in the United Kingdom with "Seven Days and One Week" and "Flash".

== Album discography ==
- This Is A...? / Acid Phase (1994)
- Release (1995) ◊
- Asteroid (1996)
- Specials "Phase One" (2011) ◊
- Fondamental (2011) ◊
- Spacetime (2011) ◊
- Specials "Phase Two" (2011) ◊ (Remixes)
- Backcatalog 1991-1993 (2013) ◊
- Soundtrack I (2013)
- Soundtrack II (2013)
- Soundtrack III (2013)
- Soundtrack IV (2013)
- Soundtrack V (2013)
- Soundtrack VI (2013)
- Soundtrack VII (2013)
- Soundtrack VIII (2013)
- Soundtrack IX (2013)
- Soundtrack X (2013)
- Soundtrack XI (2013)
- Soundtrack XII (2013) ◊
- Musiques pour ascenseur (2013)
- Perceptions (2013)
- Origin (2014)

Albums marked with a ◊ denotes compilations of previously released singles.
