= Mike Candys =

Swiss DJ and record producer

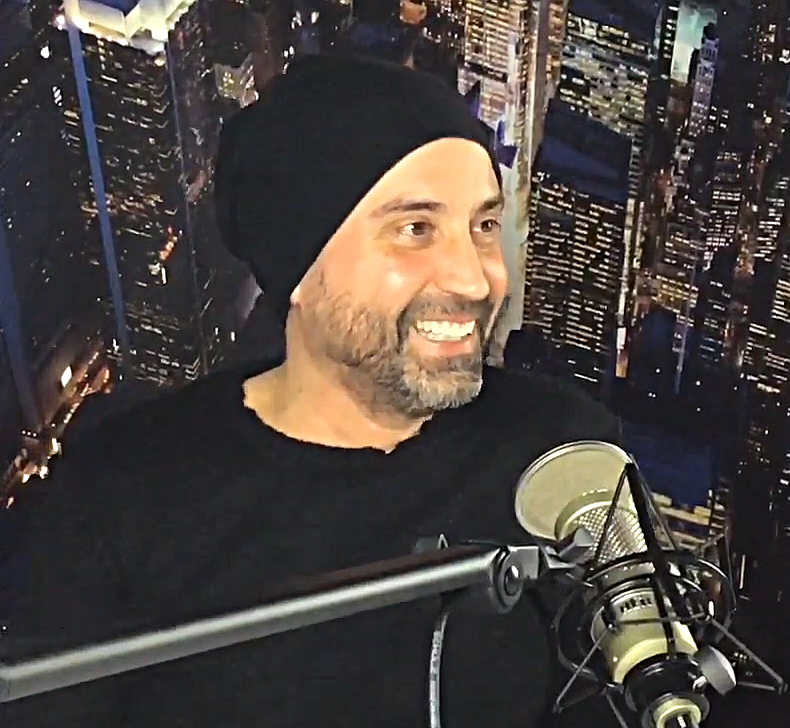
- Mike Candys during an interview

Background information
- Born: Michael David Kull; 20 August 1971 (age 55)
- Origin: Wallisellen, Zurich, Switzerland
- Genres: House, electro house, dance
- Occupations: Disc jockey, record producer, songwriter
- Years active: 2000–present
- Label: Sirup Music
- Website: mikecandys.com

Michael David Kull (Swiss Standard German pronunciation: [ˈmɪçaeːl ˈdaːvɪd ˈkʊl]; born 20 August 1971), better known as Mike Candys (/ˈkændɪs/ KAN-diss), is a Swiss DJ, songwriter and house music producer. He is managed by Mevlan D.

== Musical career ==
In 2008, Candys became widely known in Switzerland with the song "La Serenissima". In 2009 he again found success after collaborating with Jack Holiday on a remix of the Faithless song "Insomnia", which reached the top 10 in various European singles charts. His third single, "People Hold On", ranked fourth in the 2010 European club charts and was followed by "Together Again", which helped him to become internationally recognized. In 2011, he reached the top of the charts with "One Night in Ibiza", a track that contains elements of 1990s eurodance, featuring female vocalist Evelyn Zangger and rapper Patrick Miller. The song was an answer to "Welcome to St. Tropez" by Swiss DJ Antoine and Timati. In March 2012, Mike Candys released "2012 (If The World Would End)" that became a top 10 hit in German speaking countries. It is his most successful single so far.

== Discography ==
=== Albums ===
Year	Album	Peak chart positions								Certifications (sales thresholds)
Year	Album	SWI	AUT	BEL (Vl)	BEL (Wa)	DEN	FRA	GER	NED	Certifications (sales thresholds)
2011	Smile	7	57	—	—	—	—	84	—	

=== Singles ===
Year	Single	Peak chart positions								Certifications (sales thresholds)	Album
Year	Single	SWI	AUT	BEL (Fl)	BEL (Wa)	DEN	FRA	GER	NED	Certifications (sales thresholds)	Album
2011	"Together Again" (with Evelyn)	13	—	—	—	—	95	—	—		Smile
2011	"Insomnia" (with Jack Holiday)	34	41	9	16	2	15	44	30	SUI: Platinum	Smile
2011	"One Night in Ibiza" (with Evelyn featuring Patrick Miller)	7	13	—	79	—	35	11	—	SUI: Gold; GER: Gold; AUT: Gold	Smile
2011	"Around the World" (with Evelyn featuring David Deen)	54	64	—	—	—	—	—	—		Smile
2012	"Children 2012" (with Jack Holiday)	—	—	104	77	—	54	—	—		Smile
2012	"2012 (If the World Would End)" (with Evelyn featuring Patrick Miller)	3	2	—	—	—	104	3	—	SUI: Gold; GER: Gold; AUT: Gold	Smile
2012	"Sunshine (Fly So High)" (featuring Sandra Wild)	21	20	—	—	—	—	49	—		Smile
2012	"The Riddle Anthem" (with Jack Holiday)	26	29	—	81	—	43	44	—		Smile Together
2013	"Bring Back the Love" (with Jenson Vaughan)	25	72	—	—	—	—	98	—		Smile Together
2013	"Brand New Day" (with Evelyn featuring Carlprit)	42	68	—	—	—	—	—	—		Smile Together
2013	"Everybody" (with Evelyn featuring Tony T.)	11	14	—	—	—	—	40	—		
2013	"Take Control" (with DJ BoBo)	6	60	—	—	—	—	67	—		Reloaded
2013	"T-Rex"	69	—	—	—	—	—	—	—		
2014	"Miracles" (featuring Maury)	17	68	—	—	—	—	—	—		
2014	"Anubis"	51	—	—	—	—	—	—	—		
2015	"Last Man on Earth" (featuring Max C.)	22	—	—	—	—	—	—	—		
2015	"Paradise" (featuring U-Jean)	27	—	—	—	—	—	—	—		
2018	"The Riddle Anthem (Rework)" (with Jack Holiday)	88	—	—	—	—	—	—	—		
2018	"Pump It Up"	—	—	—	—	—	—	—	—		
"—" denotes a recording that did not chart or was not released in that territory.
