= Thirteen (Robert Miles album) =

Studio album by Robert Miles
- Released: 7 February 2011
- Studio: The Music Room, Ibiza, Spain; The Shell, London, UK
- Genre: Progressive rock; ambient; chill-out; downtempo; space rock
- Length: 57:27
- Label: Salt by lacono Entertainment Holding LPPSALTCD 012
- Producer: Robert Miles

Robert Miles chronology
Miles_Gurtu (2004)	Thirteen (2011)

Singles from Thirteen
- 1. "Miniature World" Released: 23 May 2011

Thirteen (stylised as Th1rt3en) is the fifth and final studio album by Robert Miles released on 7 February 2011, the third album he independently recorded and produced. The album's style is a blend of alternative and progressive rock with ambient and electronic soundscapes. It contains 13 instrumental compositions, hence the name of the album. The album was released as a CD and limited edition digipack. The digital version of the album includes an unlisted bonus track. Shortly after the release of the album, the songs "Miniature World", "Deep End", "Black Rubber", and "Antimony" were officially remixed and issued as a side release. The record also produced one single "Miniature World".

== Background ==
I discovered Miles Davis at the age of nineteen, when a good friend of mine introduced me to his music. I thought it was futuristic on a first listen and didn’t really understand the essence of it. When moving to London and listening to it again, I managed to open my mind to those sounds and arrangements. Since then, my music has contained jazz elements. The first part of Th1rt3en is definitively exploring a more jazzy approach, while the second half gets a little more progressive.

—Robert Miles, interview on tokafi.com

== Reception ==
Professional ratings
Review scores
Source	Rating
AllMusic	3.5/5 stars
The Guardian	2/5 stars
MusicOMH	4/5 stars

Tom Ewing of The Guardian stated, "When the rhythm picks up – on Black Rubber and Antimony – Thirteen seems far more purposeful. But mostly Miles' liking for placid, limpid keyboard moods fails to gel with all this hefty axework, and much of this record is like a series of swimming pools being jumped in by a series of hippos." David Welsh of MusicOMH wrote, "Robert Miles, a law unto himself as his own boss, has taken no shortcuts, and Thirteen, as a result, is as rich and rewarding a musical experience as one could hope to encounter." AllMusic's Jon O'Brien called the album "intriguing and fulfilling listen for his more recent converts."

== Track listing ==
All tracks are written by Roberto Concina.

No.	Title	Length
1.	"Orchid Miracle"	5:19
2.	"Moving"	5:25
3.	"Somnambulism"	6:37
4.	"Everything or Nothing"	5:01
5.	"Afterglow"	4:03
6.	"Deep End"	3:37
7.	"Black Rubber"	4:31
8.	"Miniature World"	3:56
9.	"Antimony"	5:03
10.	"Archives"	3:48
11.	"Voices from a Submerged Sea"	5:05
12.	"Nonsense"	0:53
13.	"The Wolf"	4:09
Total length:		57:27

== Personnel ==
- Roberto Concina – arrangements, bass guitar, composer, engineering, keyboards, mixing, production, programming, sound designing
- Toni Economides – engineering, mixing
- Paul Falloon – bass
- Michael Fossenkenper – mastering
- Robert Fripp – electric guitar, keyboards
- Davide Giovannini – drums
- Steve Hussey – string arrangements
- Dave Okumu – electric guitar
- Mike Patto – fender rhodes, keyboards
- Jon Thorne – bass, double bass
- Urban Soul Orchestra – string arrangements
