= Freedom (Robert Miles song) =

- Standard artwork

Single by Robert Miles featuring Kathy Sledge

from the album 23am
- B-side: "Remix"
- Released: 10 November 1997
- Genre: Electronic; ambient; chill-out
- Length: 4:12
- Label: Deconstruction
- Songwriters: Roberto Concina; Frank Musker
- Producer: Robert Miles

Robert Miles featuring Kathy Sledge singles chronology
"One and One" (1996)	"Freedom" (1997)	"Full Moon" (1998)

Audio
- "Freedom" on YouTube

"Freedom" is a song by Swiss-Italian musician Robert Miles featuring American singer-songwriter Kathy Sledge, known from the group Sister Sledge. The song was released on 10 November 1997 via Deconstruction label as the lead single from Miles' second album, 23am (1997). It peaked at number two in Italy and was a top 10 hit also in Spain, while reaching the top 20 in Finland, Scotland and the UK.

== Critical reception ==
A reviewer from Music Week gave the song three out of five, writing, "Starting with tinkly piano evocative of Children, then moving into Kathy Sledge's soaring vocals, Miles aims for a symphonic anthem — but somehow this lacks real drive." The magazine's Alan Jones commented, "Abandoning the waifish vocals of Maria Naylor, Robert Miles has teamed up with the throatier Kathy Sledge. The pair's new track, Freedom, lacks the instant charm of Miles' previous singles but grows with repeated listening, though it's a little muted, sounding more like a demo than finished product." James Hyman from the RM Dance Update rated the song four out of five, noting it as "simply inspired by ordinary life", having "Robert's distinct piano-tinkling and lush arrangement".

== Music video ==
A music video was produced to promote the single, directed by Massimiliano Iacono and released in November 1997.

== Track listings ==
- CD maxi, 1997
1. "Freedom" (Radio Edit) - 4:12
2. "Freedom" (Original Edit) - 4:08
3. "Freedom" (Robert Miles Club Mix) - 5:20
4. "Freedom" (Album Version) - 6:27
- Double maxi
1. "Freedom" (Radio Edit) - 4:12
2. "Freedom" (Original Edit) - 4:08
3. "Freedom" (Robert Miles Club Mix) - 5:23
4. "Freedom" (Frankie Knuckles Classic Club Mix) - 7:56
5. "Freedom" (Frankie Knuckles "The Shit" Mix) - 7:18
6. "Freedom" (Frankie Knuckles Director's Cut Dub) - 9:50

== Charts ==
=== Weekly charts ===
Weekly chart performance for "Freedom"
Chart (1997–1998)	Peak position
Belgium (Ultratip Bubbling Under Flanders)	4
Europe (Eurochart Hot 100)	26
Finland (Suomen virallinen lista)	17
Germany (GfK)	75
Ireland (IRMA)	27
Italy (FIMI)	7
Italy (Musica e dischi)	2
Italy Airplay (Music & Media)	3
New Zealand (Recorded Music NZ)	47
Scottish Singles Sales (Official Charts)	15
Spain (AFYVE)	9
Sweden (Sverigetopplistan)	59
Switzerland (Schweizer Hitparade)	41
UK Singles (Official Charts)	15

=== Year-end charts ===
1997 year-end chart performance for "Freedom"
Chart (1997)	Rank
Italy (Musica e dischi)	42

1998 year-end chart performance for "Freedom"
Chart (1998)	Rank
Europe Border Breakers (Music & Media)	39
Italy (Musica e dischi)	95
