= B.B.E. =

French trance music act

- Origin: France
- Genres: Acid trance; dream trance
- Years active: 1996–2003
- Label: Positiva
- Past members: Bruno Sanchioni; Emmanuel Top; Bruno Quartier; Royal Mike

B.B.E. was a French-based trance music act, originally composed of Italian record producers Bruno Sanchioni and Bruno Quartier, and French producer Emmanuel Top.

== Musical career ==
"Seven Days and One Week" (1996) was a top ten hit in more than ten countries worldwide, reaching number three in the United Kingdom, and in Germany. The song was certified silver by the British Phonographic Industry (BPI) for shipments of 200,000 copies in the United Kingdom.

They had two Top 5 hits in the UK: "Seven Days and One Week" and "Flash". They followed these up with two Top 20 hits: "Desire" and "Deeper Love (Symphonic Paradise)"; and a 1998 album entitled Games.

Later in the band's short career, the trio would move into more ethereal trance productions.

Emmanuel Top managed a record label called Attack Records from 1993 to 2003, and produced many dance hits. More recently, he managed a dance club in Belgium. Bruno Sanchioni co produced one of the first trance recordings, "The Age of Love".

== Discography ==
=== Studio albums ===
Title	Details	Peak chart positions
Title	Details	UK
Games	Release date: 13 July 1998; Label: Positiva Records; Formats: CD , Vinyl	60
"—" denotes releases that did not chart

=== Singles ===
Year	Single	Peak chart positions													Certifications (sales thresholds)	Album
Year	Single	AUT	BEL (Vl)	FIN	FRA	GER	IRE	ITA	NED	NOR	SPA	SUI	SWE	UK	Certifications (sales thresholds)	Album
1996	"Seven Days and One Week"	8	3	2	6	3	2	3	4	6	1	8	4	3	FRA: Silver; GER: Gold; UK: Silver	Games
1997	"Flash"	18	20	8	12	11	15	11	43	16	6	21	14	5		Games
1997	"Desire"	—	26	—	—	71	15	—	97	—	—	—	50	19		Games
1998	"Deeper Love (Symphonic Paradise)"	—	—	—	—	61	35	—	—	—	—	—	—	19		Games
2000	"Seven Days and Four Years"	—	—	—	—	—	—	—	—	—	—	—	—	—		Singles only
2001	"Orion" (vs. Emmanuel Top)	—	—	—	—	—	—	—	—	—	—	—	—	—		Singles only
2002	"Free"	—	—	—	—	—	—	—	—	—	—	—	—	—		Singles only
2003	"Hollywood"	—	—	—	—	—	—	—	—	—	—	—	—	—		Singles only
"—" denotes releases that did not chart
