= Miles Gurtu =

Miles_Gurtu

Studio album by Robert Miles & Trilok Gurtu
- Released: 10 February 2004
- Recorded: 2003
- Genre: Nu jazz
- Length: 45:14
- Label: Salt SALTCD011
- Producer: Robert Miles

Robert Miles & Trilok Gurtu chronology
Organik Remixes (2002)	Miles_Gurtu (2004)	Th1rt3en (2011)

Professional ratings
Review scores
Source	Rating
AllMusic	4/5 stars
Q	4/5 stars

Miles_Gurtu is the fourth studio album by Robert Miles, the second he independently recorded and produced. The record was released on 10 February 2004. Robert Miles and Indian jazz percussionist Trilok Gurtu met while recording Miles's last solo album, Organik, where Gurtu played percussion on three of the tracks. The result of the current collaboration is a mix of both musicians' very disparate styles. Miles_Gurtu expanded Robert Miles's "new style" started in Organik (2001), this time in a much more jazzy way.

== Track listing ==
1. "Golden Rust" – 4:46
2. "Soul Driven" – 5:03
3. "Wearing Masks" – 2:04
4. "Tragedy : Comedy" – 1:20
5. "Omen" – 1:53
6. "Loom" – 5:23
7. "Languages of Conscious Thought" – 2:13
8. "Without a Doubt" – 2:19
9. "Small World" – 3:58
10. "Small World (reprise)" – 0:35
11. "Inductive" – 5:09
12. "The Big Picture" – 5:21
13. "Xenon" – 2:10

== Personnel ==
Composed and improvised by Robert Miles and Trilok Gurtu.

Musical

- Robert Miles – keyboards
- Trilok Gurtu – drums, percussions, tabla, vocals
- Nitin Sawhney – electric guitar, nylon strings guitar
- Paul Falloon – bass
- Jon Thorne – double bass
- Mike Patto – Rhodes piano, Minimoog
- Adrian Bradbury – cello
- Toshinori Kondo – trumpet
- The Urban Soul Orchestra – strings

Technical

- Roberto Concina – composer, sound design, arranger, strings arrangements, engineer, producer
- Trilok Gurtu – background noise
- Stephen Hussey – string arrangements
- Toni Economides – engineer
- Michael Fossenkemper – mastering
- Matt Appleton – artwork
