= One Night in Ibiza =

Single by Mike Candys and Evelyn featuring Patrick Miller

from the album Smile
- Released: July 15, 2011
- Genre: Electro house, eurodance
- Length: 2:49
- Songwriters: Michael Kull; Felix Kurz; Patrick Mueller; Evelyn Zangger
- Producer: Mike Candys

Mike Candys and Evelyn featuring Patrick Miller singles chronology
"Insomnia" (2011)	"One Night in Ibiza" (2011)	"Around the World" (2011)

"One Night in Ibiza" is a song by Swiss DJ and producer Mike Candys and singer-songwriter Evelyn. It features rapper Patrick Miller.

== Track listing ==
CD single - Switzerland (2011)

1. "One Night in Ibiza" (Extended Mix) - 4:33
2. "One Night in Ibiza" (Radio Mix) - 2:49

== Chart performance ==
=== Weekly charts ===
Chart (2011)	Peak position
Austria (Ö3 Austria Top 40)	13
Belgium (Ultratip Bubbling Under Wallonia)	29
Czech Republic Airplay (ČNS IFPI)	15
France (SNEP)	35
Germany (GfK)	11
Poland (Dance Top 50)	9
Poland (Video Chart)	1
Romania (Romanian Top 100)	32
Switzerland (Schweizer Hitparade)	7

=== Year-end charts ===
Chart (2011)	Position
Austria (Ö3 Austria Top 40)	68
Germany (Official German Charts)	70
Switzerland (Schweizer Hitparade)	38

== Certifications ==
Region	Certification	Certified units/sales
Germany (BVMI)	Gold	150,000^{^}
Switzerland (IFPI Switzerland)	Platinum	30,000^{^}
^{^} Shipments figures based on certification alone.
