= Organik Remixes =

Remix album by Robert Miles
- Released: 18 November 2002
- Recorded: ?
- Genre: Electronica
- Length: 75:41 (2-CD)
- Label: Salt Records SALT CD 010
- Producer: Robert Miles

Robert Miles chronology
Organik (2001)	Organik Remixes (2002)	Miles Gurtu (2004)

Professional ratings
Review scores
Source	Rating
Allmusic	3/5 stars

Organik Remixes is a guest remix album based on Robert Miles's 2001 album Organik. The record was released on November 18, 2002 through Salt Records label. Two of the remixers, Kuzu and Fissure, were chosen by Robert Miles from an online remix contest on his own website.

== Track listing ==
CD 1

1. "Paths (FSOL Cosmic Jukebox mix)" – 3:54
2. "Wrong (Alexkid May B mix)" – 4:20
3. "Pour Te Parler (Riton Re-rub mix)" – 4:10
4. "Release Me (Da Lata El Duderino mix)" – 5:35
5. "Pour Te Parler (Kuzu mix)" – 4:20
6. "Pour Te Parler (Fissure mix)" – 4:59
7. "Paths (KV5 mix)" – 3:37

CD 2

1. "It's All Coming Back (Chamber mix)" – 5:45
2. "Separation (2nd Gen mix)" – 3:39
3. "Connections (PunkA fro The Hackney Drive-By mix)"
4. "Improvisations Part 2 (Si Begg S.I. Futures mix)" – 4:39
5. "Improvisations Part 2 (The Fabrics mix)" – 7:47
6. "Paths (Robert Miles Salted mix)" – 6:02
7. "Bhairav (Robert Miles featuring Amelia Cuni)" – 7:38
