= Fable (song) =

1996 single by Robert Miles

- Artwork for Italian CD maxi-single release, also used for the French CD release

Single by Robert Miles

from the album Dreamland
- Released: 27 May 1996
- Genre: Dream house
- Length: 7:16
- Label: DBX
- Songwriter: Roberto Concina
- Producer: Roberto Milani

Robert Miles singles chronology
| "Children" (1995) | "Fable" (1996) | "One and One" (1996) |

Music video
- "Fable" on YouTube

"Fable" is a song by Italian musician Robert Miles, released in May 1996 as the second single from his debut album, Dreamland (1996). The song features uncredited vocals from Fiorella Quinn. Like "Children", the single received universal acclaim. It was a hit in several countries, reaching number one in Italy and entering the top 10 in Austria, Belgium, Finland, France, Germany, Hungary, Iceland, Ireland, Israel, Italy, Latvia, Spain, Switzerland and UK. In 1997, the song charted on the US Billboard Dance Club Play chart, on which it peaked at number one for a week. The accompanying music video was directed by Maria Mochnacz.

== Critical reception ==
AllMusic editor Jose F. Promis wrote that the song "continues with the same formula he utilized in 'Children', this time using ethereal female chant-like vocals (also included is an instrumental version of 'Fable')." Larry Flick from Billboard magazine noted that "on this third instrumental epic from the highly influential album Dreamland Miles continues to blend racing dance beats with new-age sweetened keyboards with a flair that is difficult to fully duplicate or describe. You simply have to let the melody wash over your senses, while the groove inspires your body to move."

British Music Week gave the song a score of three out of five. Music Week editor Alan Jones added, "Robert Miles follows his platinum single 'Children' with 'Fable', another enchanting instrumental outing. It's a tad too similar, with the same throbbing NRGetic underpinning and lush strings with only the slight overlaid melody to distinguish it. Pleasant, easy listening and a hit—but don't expect it to come near 'Children' in the popularity stakes." DJ Freshy-D from Smash Hits gave it four out of five, saying, "Rasping strings greet you after pressing Play... mmm... the build-up... whoa... piano, stompy beats... breakdown! Yup, 'Fable' is another generous helping of Robert's dreamy House. It'd be futile to try and match the brilliance of 'Children' and 'Fable' follows that epic Italian sound — it's the original with a twist. Ciao!"

== Music video ==
The music video for "Fable" was directed by British photographer and music video director Maria Mochnacz. In it, Robert Miles falls asleep on his sofa, in front of the television. On the wall behind him, three girls in swimsuits are performing a choreography of synchronized swimming.

== Track listings ==
=== CD single ===
- Belgium
1. "Fable" (radio edit) – 3:50
2. "Fable" (message radio edit) – 4:00
- France
1. "Fable" (message radio edit) – 4:08
2. "Fable" (radio edit) – 3:52

=== CD maxi ===
- France
1. "Fable" (message radio edit) – 4:08
2. "Fable" (radio edit) – 3:52
3. "Fable" (extended version) – 7:12
4. "Fable" (extended message version) – 7:43
5. "Fable" (club mix) – 6:22
6. "Fable" (wake edit) – 4:42
7. "Fable" (psycho version) – 4:30
- Germany
1. "Fable" (radio edit) – 3:50
2. "Fable" (message radio edit) – 4:00
3. "Fable" (extended version) – 7:12
4. "Fable" (club mix) – 6:23
5. "Fable" (extended message version) – 7:43
6. "Fable" (psycho version - NRG mix) – 4:28
7. "Fable" (wake edit) – 4:44
- Italy
1. "Fable" (radio edit) – 3:56
2. "Fable" (message radio edit) – 4:11
3. "Fable" (extended version) – 7:12
4. "Fable" (message version) – 7:44
5. "Fable" (club version) – 6:22
6. "Fable" (wake-up version) – 4:44
7. "Fable" (psycho version) – 4:30
- Netherlands
1. "Fable" (radio edit) – 3:56
2. "Fable" (message radio) – 4:11
3. "Fable" (wake up version) – 4:30
4. "Fable" (extended version) – 7:12
- UK
1. "Fable" (radio edit) – 3:50
2. "Fable" (extended version) – 7:12
3. "Fable" (message radio edit) – 4:00
4. "Fable" (message version) – 7:30
5. "Fable" (club mix) – 6:15
6. "Fable" (wake up version) – 4:30
7. "Fable" (psycho version) – 4:20

=== 12-inch maxi ===
- Belgium
1. "Fable" (extended version) – 7:12
2. "Fable" (wake up version) – 4:30
3. "Fable" (message version) – 7:30
4. "Fable" (NRG mix) – 4:20
- France
1. "Fable" (extended version) – 7:12
2. "Fable" (wake up) – 4:44
3. "Fable" (message version) – 7:43
4. "Fable" (psycho version) – 4:28
- Germany
1. "Fable" (extended version) – 7:12
2. "Fable" (club version) – 6:23
3. "Fable" (message version) – 7:43
4. "Fable" (psycho version - NRG mix) – 4:28
5. "Fable" (wake up) – 4:44
- Italy
1. "Fable" (message version) – 7:43
2. "Fable" (psycho version - NRG mix) – 4:28
3. "Fable" (extended version) – 7:12
4. "Fable" (wake-up version) – 4:44
- UK
1. "Fable" (extended version) – 7:12
2. "Fable" (wake up version) – 4:30
3. "Fable" (extended message version) – 7:43
4. "Fable" (club mix) – 6:15

=== Double 12-inch ===
- France
1. "Fable" (extended version) – 7:12
2. "Fable" (extended message version) – 7:43
3. "Fable" (wake up) – 4:42
4. "Fable" (psycho version) – 4:30
5. "Fable" (club mix) – 6:22
- Germany
1. "Fable" (extended version) – 7:12
2. "Fable" (club mix) – 6:23
3. "Fable" (extended message version) – 7:43
4. "Fable" (psycho version - NRG mix) – 4:28
5. "Fable" (wake up) – 4:44
- Italy
1. "Fable" (extended version) – 7:12
2. "Fable" (extended message version) – 7:43
3. "Wake Up" – 4:44
4. "Fable" (psycho version - NRG mix) – 4:28
5. "Fable" (club mix) – 6:23

== Charts ==
=== Weekly charts ===
| Chart (1996–1997) | Peak position |
|---|---|
| Australia (ARIA) | 21 |
| Austria (Ö3 Austria Top 40) | 6 |
| Belgium (Ultratop 50 Flanders) | 3 |
| Belgium (Ultratop 50 Wallonia) | 5 |
| Denmark (IFPI) | 12 |
| Europe (Eurochart Hot 100) | 2 |
| Europe (European Dance Radio) | 2 |
| Europe (European Hit Radio) | 6 |
| Finland (Suomen virallinen lista) | 2 |
| France (SNEP) | 10 |
| Germany (GfK) | 3 |
| Hungary (Mahasz) | 8 |
| Iceland (Íslenski Listinn Topp 40) | 5 |
| Ireland (IRMA) | 6 |
| Israel (Israeli Singles Chart) | 2 |
| Italy (Musica e dischi) | 1 |
| Italy Airplay (Music & Media) | 6 |
| Latvia (Latvijas Top 50) | 4 |
| Netherlands (Dutch Top 40) | 24 |
| Netherlands (Single Top 100) | 16 |
| New Zealand (Recorded Music NZ) | 20 |
| Norway (VG-lista) | 15 |
| Scottish Singles Sales (Official Charts) | 4 |
| Spain (AFYVE) | 5 |
| Sweden (Sverigetopplistan) | 11 |
| Switzerland (Schweizer Hitparade) | 3 |
| UK Singles (Official Charts) | 7 |
| UK Dance (Official Charts) | 3 |
| UK Airplay (Music Week) | 49 |
| US Dance Club Songs (Billboard) | 1 |

=== Year-end charts ===
| Chart (1996) | Position |
|---|---|
| Belgium (Ultratop 50 Flanders) | 47 |
| Belgium (Ultratop 50 Wallonia) | 51 |
| Europe (Eurochart Hot 100) | 29 |
| France (SNEP) | 25 |
| Germany (Media Control) | 49 |
| Italy (Musica e dischi) | 3 |
| Latvia (Latvijas Top 50) | 34 |
| Switzerland (Schweizer Hitparade) | 35 |
| UK Singles (OCC) | 92 |

== Certifications ==
| Region | Certification | Certified units/sales |
|---|---|---|
| France (SNEP) | Gold | 250,000^{*} |
^{*} Sales figures based on certification alone.

== Release history ==
| Region | Date | Format(s) | Label(s) | Ref. |
|---|---|---|---|---|
| Germany | 27 May 1996 | CD | Urban | |
| Japan | 21 September 1996 | CD | Deconstruction; BMG | |
| United States | 8 April 1997 | Contemporary hit radio | Arista | |
