= Dreamland (Robert Miles album) =

1996 album by Robert Miles

Studio album by Robert Miles
- Released: 7 June 1996
- Recorded: 1994–1996
- Genres: Progressive house; ambient; techno; dream trance
- Length: 70:15
- Labels: Motor; Arista; Deconstruction; GT music (Remastered Edition)
- Producer: Robert Miles

Robert Miles chronology
Dreamland (1996)	23am (1997)

Singles from Dreamland
- 1. "Children" Released: 13 November 1995; 2. "Fable" Released: 27 May 1996; 3. "One and One" Released: 4 November 1996

Professional ratings
Review scores
Source	Rating
AllMusic	4/5 stars
Billboard	(favorable)
Cash Box	(favorable)
Q	4/5 stars

Dreamland is the debut studio album by Robert Miles. It was released on 7 June 1996 to critical acclaim in Europe, where it was a hit, and was also released in the United States about a month later, with a new track sung by Maria Nayler, "One and One." This new track became very popular and was later released as a single in the US and Germany.

At the end of 1996, Miles released a new version of Dreamland, called Dreamland – The Winter Edition, in Germany. It was largely similar to Dreamland, but contains the tracks "For Us" and "One and One" (which was not released on the European version) and removes "Fable (Dream Version)", and was also released in Japan. Nowadays it appears that the US version of Dreamland including "One and One" (with "One and One" being the sixth track, coming after "In My Dreams" and before "Princess of Light") is the most popular and common version.

== Track listings ==
=== Original issue ===
All tracks are written by Roberto Concina except "One and One", written by Billy Steinberg, Rick Nowels, and Marie-Claire D'Ubaldo.

No.	Title	Length
1.	"Children" (Dream Version)	6:41
2.	"Fable" (Message Version)	6:20
3.	"Fantasya"	5:33
4.	"Landscape"	5:33
5.	"In My Dreams"	6:08
6.	"Princess of Light"	6:12
7.	"Fable" (Dream Version)	7:03
8.	"In the Dawn"	7:45
9.	"Children" (Original Version)	6:14
10.	"Red Zone"	6:46

=== US version ===
No.	Title	Length
1.	"Children" (Dream Version)	7:06
2.	"Fable" (Message Version)	6:24
3.	"Fantasya"	5:43
4.	"Landscape"	6:02
5.	"In My Dreams"	6:14
6.	"One and One"	3:59
7.	"Princess of Light"	6:20
8.	"Fable" (Dream Version)	7:13
9.	"In the Dawn"	7:59
10.	"Children" (Original Version)	6:19
11.	"Red Zone"	6:57

=== The Winter Edition ===
No.	Title	Length
1.	"One and One" (Radio Version)	3:54
2.	"Children"	6:51
3.	"Fable" (Message Version)	6:24
4.	"Fantasya"	5:41
5.	"Landscape"	6:05
6.	"In My Dreams"	6:12
7.	"Princess of Light"	6:18
8.	"For Us"	7:40
9.	"In the Dawn"	7:43
10.	"Children"	6:40
11.	"Red Zone"	6:37
12.	"One and One" (Club Version)	6:31

=== Remastered Edition ===
No.	Title	Length
1.	"Children" (Dream Version)	6:41
2.	"Fable" (Message Version)	6:20
3.	"Fantasya"	5:33
4.	"Landscape"	5:33
5.	"In My Dreams"	6:08
6.	"Princess of Light"	6:12
7.	"Fable" (Dream Version)	7:03
8.	"In the Dawn"	7:45
9.	"Children" (Original Version)	6:14
10.	"Red Zone"	6:46
11.	"One and One"	3:59
12.	"4 Us"	7:40

== Charts and certifications ==
=== Weekly charts ===
Chart (1996)	Peak position
Australian Albums (ARIA)	12
Austrian Albums (Ö3 Austria)	7
Belgian Albums (Ultratop Flanders)	13
Belgian Albums (Ultratop Wallonia)	10
Canada Top Albums/CDs (RPM)	13
Dutch Albums (Album Top 100)	19
Finnish Albums (Suomen virallinen lista)	8
French Albums (SNEP)	4
German Albums (Offizielle Top 100)	2
Italian Albums (FIMI)	15
Hungarian Albums (MAHASZ)	1
New Zealand Albums (RMNZ)	3
Norwegian Albums (VG-lista)	18
Portuguese Albums (AFP)	1
Scottish Albums (Official Charts)	8
Swedish Albums (Sverigetopplistan)	6
Swiss Albums (Schweizer Hitparade)	2
UK Albums (Official Charts)	7
US Billboard 200	54
Chart (2017)	Peak position
Swiss Albums (Schweizer Hitparade)	81
Italian Albums (FIMI)	71
UK Dance Albums (Official Charts)	3

=== Year-end Charts ===
Chart (1996)	Position
Austrian Albums (Ö3 Austria)	36
Canadian Albums (RPM)	88
European Albums (Music & Media)	25
French Albums (SNEP)	19
German Albums (Offizielle Top 100)	20
Italian Albums (FIMI)	58
New Zealand Albums (RMNZ)	31
Swedish Albums (Sverigetopplistan)	73
Swiss Albums (Schweizer Hitparade)	16
UK Albums (OCC)	37

Chart (1997)	Position
Dutch Albums (Album Top 100)	66

=== Certifications ===
Region	Certification	Certified units/sales
Australia (ARIA)	Gold	35,000^{^}
Belgium (BRMA)	Gold	25,000^{*}
Canada (Music Canada)	Platinum	100,000^{^}
Germany (BVMI)	Platinum	500,000^{^}
France (SNEP)	2× Gold	200,000^{*}
Japan (RIAJ)	Gold	100,000^{^}
New Zealand (RMNZ)	Platinum	15,000^{^}
Poland (ZPAV)	Platinum	100,000^{*}
Switzerland (IFPI Switzerland)	Platinum	50,000^{^}
United Kingdom (BPI)	Platinum	300,000^{^}
United States (RIAA)	Gold	500,000^{^}
Summaries
Europe (IFPI)	Platinum	1,000,000^{*}
^{*} Sales figures based on certification alone.^{^} Shipments figures based on certification alone.
