= Saturday night slaughter =

Italian social phenomenon

The Saturday night slaughter (Italian: Strage di sabato sera) was a social phenomenon among Italy's youth starting in the 1990s.

== Phenomenon ==
Starting in the 1990s, young adults in Italy would often go clubbing at night, particularly those in the dance and rave scenes. Many would be sleep-deprived, high, and drunk, and would drive home from events, causing road accidents that often lead to injury and death. In addition to lack of full awareness while driving under the influence, it was believed that the drugs done by clubbers would cause riskier driving habits, which would also lead to an abnormal increase in car-related fatalities. On two weekends in 2001, more than 917 young adults, mostly men, were killed in car accidents relating to inebriation from partying.

== Response ==
=== Government ===
Many groups came out asking for stricter laws to prevent such deaths from occurring, including a formation called the "anti-rock moms". Subsequently, the Italian Council of Ministers issued an announcement on May 26, 1990 that limited the hours of nightclubs to 8:00 PM to 2:00 AM. This was to limit lengthy parties tiring out its attendees. In 1991, national railway carriers introduced a 'disco train' that went in a round loop to prevent partyers from ever entering cars.

In 2006, Grand Prix champion Valentino Rossi agreed to participate in a government awareness campaign about road safety in light of the continued trend of youth car accidents of this nature. After longtime outcry from parents, Italian police officers began increasing breathalyzer testing. Alcohol checks of this nature increased tenfold from 2006 to 2014.

=== Extrajudicial ===
Italian producer Robert Miles famously composed Children, a trance song played at the end of DJ sets intended to de-stimulate and calm attendees in the early hours of the morning before they left parties, intending to calm them before their journeys home. Many DJs began playing similarly toned-down music at the end of their sets, garnering approval from authorities and parents. A similar initiative was carried out by the Italian Union of Dance Clubs (Italian: Sindacato italiano dei locali da ballo). In partnership with them, Ivan Graziani released a 45 rpm, Tutto il coraggio che hai/Guaglio' guaglio', which dealt with the themes of the phenomenon. It was distributed free-of-charge to disco clubs around the country.

== In popular culture ==
- The 1992 Italian film Sabato italiano, a movie about Italian nightlife, featured plotlines relating to car accidents of partyers reminiscent of the Saturday night slaughter, seeking to draw attention to it among a myriad of other sensitive topics.
- The 2012 Italian miniseries, La vita che corre, also contains themes reminiscent of the Saturday night slaughter, and 'Stragi del sabato sera' was a working title during the film's production.

== See also ==
- Rave culture
