= The Age of Love (Age of Love song) =

Single by Age of Love
- Released: March 1990 (Belgium)
- Recorded: 1990
- Genre: Dance; techno
- Label: DiKi Records
- Songwriters: Giuseppe Chierchia; Bruno Sanchioni
- Producers: Bruno Sanchioni; Roger Samyn

"The Age of Love" is a self-titled track by Italian-Belgian duo Age of Love and is notable as an early popular example of trance music. Released as a single in 1990 on the Belgian label DiKi Records, it was written by Bruno Sanchioni and Giuseppe Chierchia, and produced by Bruno Sanchioni and Roger Samyn, the owner of DiKi Records.

The most well-known version of the song is a 1992 remix by German duo Jam & Spoon, subtitled the "Watch Out for Stella Remix". To this day, the track continues to be remixed and featured on compilations. As of November 2022, the online resource Discogs has cataloged a total of 126 known releases and 431 appearances on compilations. The most recent remix of "The Age of Love", produced by Israeli duo Vini Vici and Belgian duo Dimitri Vegas & Like Mike, was released on October 14, 2022.

== Background and production ==
The original version of "The Age of Love" was produced by Bruno Sanchioni and Roger Samyn at the DiKi Records record shop and recording studio in Mouscron, Belgium. At the time, Sanchioni had just come from finishing promotional activities for his track "Te Quiero", which he released under the pseudonym Pedro Ramón. Speaking to Italian blog Decadance in 2021, Roger's son and current DiKi Records owner Jean-François Samyn recalls Sanchioni working on an instrumental demo that sounded "quite promising". Although Roger and Jean-François liked what Sanchioni was working on at the time and encouraged him to keep working on it, he was ultimately frustrated as he was unable to get the right vocals to fit with the track. One day, however, after listening to the D-Shake song "Yaaah", Sanchioni said to Jean-François that what the demo truly needed was "a 'C'mon'-type sample, perhaps sung by a woman".

For many years, the identity of the vocalist behind the spoken female vocals featured in the song was unknown; some sites had previously attributed it to Dutch model and singer Karen Mulder. However, it was officially revealed in the Decadance interview by Jean-François that those vocals were actually performed by French dancer Valérie Honoré.

One night after performing as a dancer for Sanchioni's shows as Pedro Ramón at a club in Paris, he had asked Honoré about doing some female vocals on one of his musical projects, wanting something in the vein of the French spoken-word segments in Visage's song "Fade to Grey". When Honoré came to record her vocals for the song in Sanchioni's studio, she was ultimately taken aback at how the track sounded almost nothing like "Fade to Grey". Regardless, she wrote and recorded the English lines "Come on, dance with me / Move your body, you like the beat". Honoré was not aware of her vocals being featured in the final version of the song until she heard it in a club one night. She was not credited on any versions of the original release, and only in 2021 was her name finally listed on vinyl reissues of "The Age of Love". Honoré has since gone on to work in decorating and upholstery.

The original versions also feature rough male rapping by Chierchia, which is not present on any of the remixes. In the Decadance interview, Jean-François said that Chierchia's involvement came about when Roger asked another producer, Philippe de Keukeleire (the son of Marcel de Keukeleire), if he had any vocalists willing to work with Sanchioni on "The Age of Love". It turned out that Keukeleire was working with Chierchia at the time, who was more than willing to appear on the song. The song's instrumental had already been finished and titled at that point; the song's title was based on a vocal sample from the MTS & RTT song "Native House", which itself samples the Divine song "Native Love (Step by Step)". The song's arpeggiated bassline was also partially inspired by "Native Love".

Speaking to Vice Italy in 2016, Chierchia said that Sanchioni's original production was, in his own words: "Really obscene, unbearable, hideous... [...] A real musical accident." Chierchia wrote some nonsensical English lyrics to go with the song, and after he finished recording his vocals, he said to Sanchioni: "Do whatever you want with it, just don't put my name on it, have mercy!".

Sanchioni and Chierchia never released another single under the moniker "Age of Love"; Sanchioni would however continue to produce as part of the trance act B.B.E.

== Jam & Spoon remix ==
In 1992, the British label React released Jam & Spoon's "Watch Out for Stella" remix, which gained more popularity than the original track. The 'Watch Out for Stella' subtitle was a reference to their own track "Stella" which was released around the same time on their 'Tales from a Danceographic Ocean EP' on the legendary Belgian label R&S Records. Stella is the name of Jam aka Jam el Mar's daughter.

Also speaking to Decadance, Jam el Mar said that the remix took only two days to complete. They were paid around £1,000 (around £1,991 in 2022) by React to remix it. Following the success of their remix, Chierchia and Sanchioni reached out to the duo about potentially doing an album with them in a similar vein. However, they turned down the offer as they were busy working on their own album, "Triptomatic Fairytales 2001".

== Reception ==
According to Jean-François, when the song originally came out in 1990, the song had sold around 720 copies. However, by the time Jam & Spoon's remix was released, the sales instantly skyrocketed. In his interview with Vice, Chierchia claimed that six months after he recorded his vocals, the song had sold over four million copies worldwide.

British hardhouse and trance music record producer Jon the Dentist picked "The Age of Love" (the Jam & Spoon mixes) as one of his favourites, adding "This is a guaranteed floor-filler. It's a classic techno track – probably the first ever proper trance track."

== Impact and legacy ==
The popularity of Jam and Spoon's remix opened up opportunities for future remixes by artists such as Paul van Dyk, Charlotte de Witte, Cosmic Gate and many others. In 1997, a re-release of "The Age of Love", which featured both the 'Watch Out for Stella' remix and van Dyk's remix, reached No. 1 on the UK Dance Singles Chart.

During his Decadance interview, Jean-François said that while Roger and DiKi were partnered with React, they made a note in the remix brief stating that it was absolutely crucial for any of the remixes made of "The Age of Love" to be based on the original version by Sanchioni and not the Jam & Spoon remix. An earlier version of Paul van Dyk's remix was rejected for this reason.

The track was featured in the hit film Human Traffic, based on the UK club scene. In 2022, Rolling Stone ranked "The Age of Love" number 113 in their list of the "200 Greatest Dance Songs of All Time".

== Track listings ==
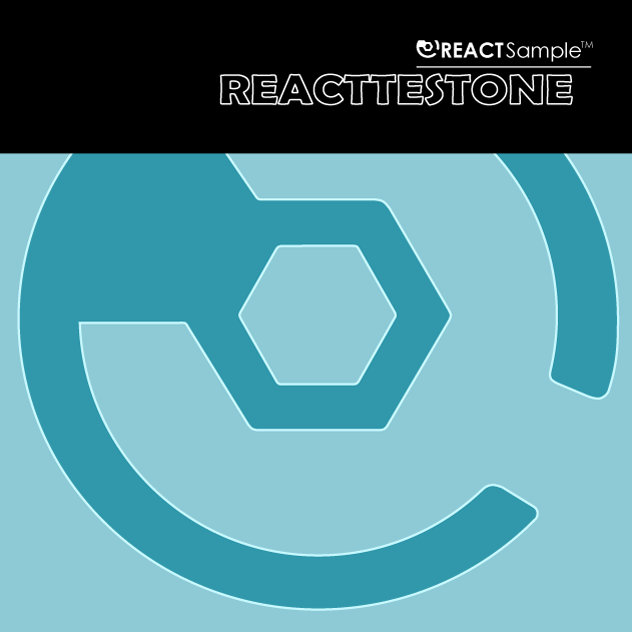
The Age of Love (Watch Out for Stella Mix) from the album Test One by React in 1992

- Single: The Age of Love (Original Versions) (1990)
1. "The Age of Love" (Radio Version) (3:48) (YouTube video)
2. "The Age of Love" (Flying Mix) (5:55) (YouTube video)
3. "The Age of Love" (New Age Mix) (5:05) (YouTube video)
4. "The Age of Love" (Boeing Mix) (5:05) (YouTube video)
- Single: The Age of Love (The Jam & Spoon Mixes) (1992)
1. "The Age of Love" - Watch Out for Stella Club Mix (6:48) (YouTube video)
2. "The Age of Love" - Sign of the Time Mix (6:58) (YouTube video)
3. "The Age of Love" - OPM Mix (6:53) (YouTube video)
4. "The Age of Love" - New Age Mix (5:06) (YouTube video)
5. "The Age of Love" - Boeing Mix (5:06) (YouTube video)
- Single: The Age of Love (The Remixes) (1997)
1. "The Age of Love" (Jam & Spoon Radio Mix) (3:19) (YouTube video)
2. "The Age of Love" (Paul van Dyk Radio Edit) (3:34) (YouTube video)
3. "The Age of Love" (Paul van Dyk Love of Ages Remix) (8:36) (YouTube video)
4. "The Age of Love" (Jam & Spoon Watch Out for Stella Mix) (6:39) (YouTube video)
5. "The Age of Love" (Emmanuel Top Remix) (9:11) (YouTube video)
6. "The Age of Love" (Baby Doc Remix) (7:25) (YouTube video)
7. "The Age of Love" (Jam & Spoon Sign of the Time Remix) (6:58) (YouTube video)
- Single: The Age of Love '98
1. "The Age of Love '98" (Radio Edit) (3:55) (YouTube video)
2. "The Age of Love '98" (Johnny Vicious Mix) (11:43) (YouTube video)
3. "The Age of Love '98" (Brainbug Mix) (6:51) (YouTube video)
4. "The Age of Love '92" (Jam & Spoon "Watch Out for Stella" Mix) (6:39)
- Single: The Age of Love (2004)
1. "The Age of Love" (Cosmic Gate Radio Mix) (4:06) (YouTube video)
2. "The Age of Love" (Marc et Claude Radio Edit) (3:05) (YouTube video)
3. "The Age of Love" (Watch Out For Stella Radio Cut) (3:06) (YouTube video)
4. "The Age of Love" (Cosmic Gate Remix) (8:43) (YouTube video)
5. "The Age of Love" (Marc et Claude Remix) (7:23) (YouTube video)
6. "The Age of Love" (Paul van Dyk Remix) (8:39) (YouTube video)
7. "The Age of Love" (Watch Out For Stella Mix) (6:45)
- Single: The Age of Love (2009)
1. "The Age of Love" (Radio Edit) (3:58)
2. "The Age of Love" (Original Vocal Mix) (6:01)
3. "The Age of Love" (Original Instrumental Mix) (5:21)
4. "The Age of Love" (Sign of the Time Mix) (6:57)
5. "The Age of Love" (O.P.M. Mix) (6:53)
6. "The Age of Love" (Flying Mix) (5:56)
7. "The Age of Love" (New Age Mix) (5:14)
8. "The Age of Love" (Boeing Mix) (5:14)
9. "The Age of Love" (Jam & Spoon Watch Out for Stella Radio Edit) (3:23)
10. "The Age of Love" (Jam & Spoon Watch Out for Stella Mix) (6:48)
11. "The Age of Love" (Paul van Dyk Radio Edit) (3:37)
12. "The Age of Love" (Paul van Dyk Mix) (8:45)
13. "The Age of Love" (Steve Gerard Wrecked Angle Mix) (10:18)
14. "The Age of Love" (Secret Knowledge Mix) (10:01)
15. "The Age of Love" (Emmanuel Top Mix) (9:12)
16. "The Age of Love" (Cosmic Gate Mix) (8:45)
17. "The Age of Love" (Manu Kenton Remix) (8:08)
18. "The Age of Love" (Baby Doc Mix) (7:25)
19. "The Age of Love" (Marc et Claude Remix) (7:25)
20. "The Age of Love" (Marco V Remix) (7:27) (YouTube video)
- Single: The Age of Love (Solomun Renaissance Remix) (2017)
1. "The Age of Love" (Solomun Renaissance Remix) (8:10) (YouTube video)
- Single: The Age of Love (Charlotte de Witte and Enrico Sangiuliano Remix) (2021)
1. "The Age of Love" (Charlotte de Witte and Enrico Sangiuliano Remix) (6:22) (YouTube video)
- Single: The Age of Love 2022 (Dimitri Vegas & Like Mike X Age Of Love X Vini Vici) (2022)
1. "The Age of Love 2022" (YouTube video)
- Single: The Age of Love 2026 (Alfa Key Apostolos Kolovos Remixes 2025 - 2026)
1. "The Age Of Love 2026" The Age Of Love - Alfa Key Epic Extented Remix & New Lyrics 2026
2. "The Age Of Love - Alfa Key (No More Lies 2026 Remix) https://soundcloud.com/apostolos-kolovos/age-of-love-alfa-key-no-more
