= 4 Clubbers =

German trance music group

- Origin: Germany
- Genres: Electronic dance music
- Years active: 2001-present
- Members: Markus Boehme; Martin Hensing; Jens Kindervater; Bernd Johnen

4 Clubbers is a German trance music group, best known for their cover of the song "Children".

== Discography ==
=== Singles ===
- 2001: "Children" - UK #45
- 2002: "Someday"
- 2002: "Together"
- 2003: "Why Don't You Dance with Me"
- 2004: "Elements of Culture"
- 2004: "Secrets" / "Sonar"
- 2006: "Let Me Be Your Fantasy"
- 2007: "Time" (featuring Silvy De Bie)
- 2008: "Try and Try" (featuring Damae)

=== Sampler ===
- 2002: Frankfurt Trance 9
