= Jack Holiday =

Swiss DJ & record producer (born 1982)

- Born: Christian Korcan; 11 March 1982 (age 44)
- Origin: Zürich, Switzerland
- Genres: House, electro house
- Occupations: DJ, record producer, songwriter
- Years active: 2007–present
- Website: JackHoliday.ch

Christian Korcan, better known by his stage name Jack Holiday, is a Swiss DJ, record producer and songwriter, and considered a renowned figure in Swiss house music, well known for his collaborations with Swiss DJs Mike Candys and Christopher S. The three have carved up a partnership in similar fashion to the Swedish House Mafia.

== Biography ==
Jack Holiday's big success came with the release of "Insomnia" with Mike Candys. It became an international hit not only in France and Switzerland, but also in Denmark, Belgium, Germany and the Netherlands. Their version was in the top 10 best selling singles in France and the Benelux countries in 2011.

Based on that success, Holiday released other singles like "Raise Your Hands" that reached top of the French dance charts and "Love for You" which was featured on Fun Radio.

== Discography ==
=== Singles ===
| Year | Single | Peak chart positions | | | | | | | | Certifications (sales thresholds) | Album |
| Year | Single | SWI | AUT | BEL (Vl) | BEL (Wa) | DEN | FRA | GER | NED | Certifications (sales thresholds) | Album |
|---|---|---|---|---|---|---|---|---|---|---|---|
| 2009 | "Insomnia" (with Mike Candys) | 34 | 41 | 9 | 16 | 2 | 15 | 44 | 30 | SWI: Platinum | |
| 2012 | "Children 2012" (with Mike Candys) | — | — | 54 (Ultratip) | 22 (Ultratip) | — | 54 | — | — | | |
| 2012 | "The Riddle Anthem" (with Mike Candys) | 26 | 29 | — | — | — | 43 | 44 | — | | |
| 2018 | "The Riddle Anthem (Rework)" (with Mike Candys) | 88 | — | — | — | — | — | — | — | | |
"—" denotes releases that did not chart.
