= Insomnia (Faithless song) =

1995 single by Faithless

Single by Faithless

from the album Reverence
- Released: 27 November 1995
- Genre: Progressive house
- Length: 8:46 (album version); 3:36 (radio edit); 8:38 (Monster Mix version)
- Label: Cheeky; Arista
- Songwriters: Maxi Jazz; Sister Bliss; Rollo
- Producer: Rollo

Faithless singles chronology
"Salva Mea" (1995)	"Insomnia" (1995)	"Don't Leave" (1996)
"Don't Leave" (1996)	"Insomnia" (1996)	"Salva Mea" (1996)
"Why Go?" (2005)	"Insomnia 2005" (2005)	"Fatty Boo" (2005)

Audio sample
- file; help

Music video
- "Insomnia" on YouTube

Alternative cover
- 2005 version

"Insomnia" is a song by British musical group Faithless. Released as the band's second single, it became one of their most successful. It was originally released in 1995 and reached number 27 on the UK Singles Chart, topping the UK Dance Chart in the process. When re-released in October 1996, the song achieved a new peak of number three in the United Kingdom and topped the charts of Finland, Greece, Norway, and Switzerland, as well as the American and Canadian dance charts. It also featured on Faithless's 1996 debut album, Reverence. The music video for "Insomnia" was directed by Lindy Heymann.

"Insomnia" was voted by Mixmag readers as the fifth greatest dance record of all time in 2013. It was certified triple platinum by the British Phonographic Industry (BPI) in 2023.

== Lyrics and composition ==
The song features Maxi Jazz rapping from the point of view of an insomniac while he struggles to sleep ("I toss and I turn without cease, like a curse, open my eyes and rise like yeast/At least a couple of weeks since I last slept, kept takin' sleepers, but now I keep myself pepped"). The subject is resonant with fans of dance music, as stimulant use is common in club/rave culture, and insomnia is a common side effect - in a 2020 interview, Maxi Jazz acknowledged how it struck a chord with clubbers: "Suddenly the song was being played to crowds who had arguably taken 50 quid’s worth of high-powered drugs and weren’t thinking of getting much sleep for days... If I had a quid for every time someone’s come up going, 'I can’t get no sleep', I’d be living on the space station". The insomniac is also rather destitute ("Make my way to the refrigerator/One dry potato inside, no lie, not even bread, jam, when the light above my head went bam..."). According to Maxi, he spent 20 minutes writing the lyrics after being given the song's title by Rollo Armstrong, before finishing them in the studio the following evening and laying the vocal down in about 25 minutes. Although he was not an insomniac, Maxi drew on personal experience for the lyrics: he had recently suffered a painful dental abscess which had kept him awake at night. Lines about the light going out and picking up a pen in darkness were based on the prepayment electricity meter in his home, which would cut out when credit ran out, forcing him to write by candlelight.

According to Sister Bliss, the track's music was written in bandmate Rollo's recording studio, located in a garden shed: she came up with the song's title as she was unable to sleep, describing the experience of working in the studio during the day and DJing at night as being "like having permanent jetlag". She has stated that the song's reggae-inflected bassline was influenced by Lionrock, whilst placing the main keyboard riff towards the end of the song "was an idea we got from Underworld’s way of building tension: just waiting, waiting, waiting then – bang!". Sister Bliss wrote the riff after Rollo asked her to "do big strings", borrowing the idea of shifting from a major chord to a minor chord from Donna Summer's "I Feel Love".

== Release ==
The album version is nearly nine minutes long and contains some lyrics not able to be broadcast on the radio edit due to their explicit content. Maxi Jazz changed the opening line from "I only smoke weed when I need to" to "Deep in the bosom of the gentle night" due to pressure from MTV. It also contains some bells chiming at the start of the song (sampled from a BBC Sound Archive disc) not generally known by the club-going public as many people know the Monster Mix or the Monster Mix Radio Edit. The beginning of the Moody Mix of the song also features a sample from Biosphere's "Novelty Waves" (1994). The version present on the album Reverence is an edit that combines the Moody Mix and the Monster Mix, meaning the sample is also present on the album version. The Monster Mix was the mix featured on Faithless' greatest hits album Forever Faithless, with the original edit being the work of Radio Victory's Bill Padley. This edit was picked up by BBC Radio 1 upon release in 1995 and became a small UK Top 40 hit, with the Cheeky label's recording being licensed through Champion Records at the time. After the song gained popularity in continental Europe, Pete Tong campaigned for a re-release: Cheeky/Champion chose to hold back the re-issue so it arrived in shops on the same day as the Spice Girls' "Say You'll Be There", so it would be placed in racks alongside it. The song charted at number 3 in the UK, appearing two places below the aforementioned Spice Girls single, while also topping the UK Dance charts. The song also went on to top the US Hot Dance Club Play chart. The Moody Mix featured on some of the singles was also on the Reverence / Irreverence release.

== Critical reception ==
Justin Chadwick from Albumism described the song as a "frenetic yet melodic ode to late night restlessness and sleep-deprived reveries", adding it as "phenomenal". Larry Flick of Billboard magazine wrote, "This single serves as a fine peek into the project, giving listeners a taste of urgent dance rhythms, a complex and infectious pop melody, and vocals that are notches above the typical vamps heard on club-originated records." Complex said that Faithless' "Insomnia" "spoke to a number of ravers out there who lived for the night/weekend and, sadly, the drugs that kept them partying to the break of dawn (and beyond). Insomnia was and is real for the raver massive, and Faithless brought those vibes to song perfectly." Gerry Kiernan commented on the song in the 2010 book 1001 Songs You Must Hear Before You Die, "Unleashed in an era of uplifting "handbag" house", "Insomnia" crept with nocturnal stealth through rave culture into suburban bedrooms. As its title suggested, this climatic, hands-in-the-air dance anthem was not one to put on before bedtime." Tim Jeffery from Music Week's RM Dance Update rated it four out of five, writing, "Following very much in the style of its predecessor with all the Rollo production hallmarks including the piercing organ and synth riffs and a bouncy bassline. As with the debut, there's also the half speed section in the middle to incorporate the rap and vocals which aren't as instant as 'Salva Mea' but grow on you. With the formula now established, this one may fare better commercially." Ben Turner from Muzik noted that "it has soul, grace, emotion and a distinctly dark, melancholic side. Happy house has never been challenged in this way."

== Chart performance ==
"Insomnia" reached number one in Finland, Greece, Norway and Switzerland. Additionally, it entered the top 10 in Austria, Denmark, Flanders, France, Germany, Iceland, Ireland, Sweden and the United Kingdom, as well as on the Eurochart Hot 100, where it peaked at number three. In the UK, "Insomnia" also peaked at number three in its second run on the UK Singles Chart, on 20 October 1996. But on the UK Dance Chart, it peaked at number-one. Outside Europe, the single reached the top spot on the RPM Dance chart in Canada and the Billboard Dance Club Play in the United States. On the Billboard Hot 100, it reached number 62. In Oceania, it reached number 16 in Australia and number 39 in New Zealand. In West Asia, it became a top-10 hit in Israel, peaking at number six on 4 November 1996. The song earned a gold record in Australia, Belgium, France and Switzerland, a platinum record in Germany and Norway, and a triple platinum record in the UK, with sales and streams of 1,800,000 units. After Maxi Jazz's December 2022 death, "Insomnia" charted at number four on the UK Singles Downloads Chart.

== Music video ==
A music video was made to accompany the song. It was directed by British director Lindy Heymann and set on the Lefevre Walk estate in Bow, East London. The video was uploaded to YouTube in July 2015, and as of January 2026, it had generated more than 184 million views.

== Impact and legacy ==
In 1998, DJ Magazine ranked "Insomnia" number 14 in their list of "Top 100 Club Tunes". In November 2011, MTV Dance ranked it number 22 in their "The 100 Biggest 90's Dance Anthems Of All Time". In 2013, it was voted by Mixmag readers as the fifth "Greatest Dance Record of All Time". In 2014, Complex included it in their list of "Songs Every Dance Music Fan Should Know, Vol. 1". In 2017, Billboard ranked "Insomnia" number 20 in their list of "The 100 Greatest Pop Songs of 1997", naming it "a towering house opus wrapped around a late night's restlessness, turning the attempt to shed consciousness into an epic struggle, with as much internal conflict as the withdrawal scenes from Trainspotting." In 2020, Mixmag featured it in their "The Biggest Drops in Dance Music", writing, "Maxi Jazz's spoken words about struggling to kip - alongside a heartbeat build-up - are deeply ingrained in worldwide consciousness, as are the piercing, relentless synth stabs that burst into the tune a few minutes in. You'll do well to get some shut-eye after turning this one up loud. Anthem, mate, absolute anthem."

In March 2026, American singer-songwriter Bebe Rexha interpolated the melody of "Insomnia" in her single "New Religion", which is credited as a duet between Rexha and Faithless.

== Track listing ==
1995 UK release and 1996 UK CD 1

1. "Insomnia" (Monster Radio Edit) – 3:34
2. "Insomnia" (Original Radio Edit) – 3:36
3. "Insomnia" (Monster Mix) – 8:38
4. "Insomnia" (Moody Mix) – 10:40
5. "Insomnia" (Tuff Mix) – 7:18

1995 European release

1. "Insomnia" (CEC Edit) – 4:37
2. "Insomnia" (Monster Radio Edit) – 3:33
3. "Insomnia" (Original Mix) – 10:55
4. "Insomnia" (Monster Mix) – 8:38
5. "Insomnia" (Moody Mix) – 10:42
6. "Insomnia" (Tuff Mix) – 7:19

1996 Scandinavian release

1. "Insomnia" (Monster Radio Edit) – 3:36
2. "Insomnia" (Original Radio Edit) – 3:38
3. "Insomnia" (Monster Mix) – 8:41
4. "Insomnia" (Moody Mix) – 10:45
5. "Insomnia" (Tuff Mix) – 7:18

1996 Italian release

1. "Insomnia" (Monster Radio Edit) – 3:34
2. "Insomnia" (Original Radio Edit) – 3:36
3. "Insomnia" (Monster Mix) – 8:38
4. "Insomnia" (Moody Mix) – 10:40
5. "Insomnia" (Tuff Mix) – 7:18

1996 UK CD 2

1. "Insomnia" (CEC Radio Mix) – 3:53
2. "Insomnia" (96 Remix) – 7:16
3. "Insomnia" (DJ Quicksilver Mix) – 7:58
4. "Insomnia" (De Donatis Mix) – 7:38

1996 European release

1. "Insomnia" (CEC Radio Mix) – 3:53
2. "Insomnia" (Original Radio Edit) – 3:37
3. "Insomnia" (96 Remix) – 7:16
4. "Insomnia" (DJ Quicksilver Mix) – 7:58
5. "Insomnia" (De Donatis Mix) – 7:38
6. "Insomnia" (Monster Mix) – 8:35

1997 US release 1

1. "Insomnia" (Monster Mix Radio Edit) – 3:33
2. "Insomnia" (Armand's European Vacation Mix) – 7:56
3. "Insomnia" (Monster Mix) – 8:34
4. "Insomnia" (Armand's Mission to Mars Mix) – 8:49
5. "Insomnia" (De Donatis Mix) – 7:35
6. "Insomnia" (CEC Radio Mix) – 3:51

1997 US release 2

1. "Insomnia" (Monster Mix Radio Edit) – 3:33
2. "Insomnia" (Album Version) – 8:43
3. "Insomnia" (De Donatis Mix) – 7:23
4. "Reverence" (Tamsin's Drum & Bass Mix) – 5:20
5. "Don't Leave" (Floating Bass Mix) – 5:53

^{*}The 1997 US releases used the 1995 UK release cover

== Charts ==
=== Weekly charts ===
Chart (1995–1997)	Peak position
Australia (ARIA)	16
Austria (Ö3 Austria Top 40)	5
Belgium (Ultratop 50 Flanders)	2
Belgium (Ultratop 50 Wallonia)	6
Canada (Nielsen SoundScan)	6
Canada Dance/Urban (RPM)	1
Denmark (Tracklisten)	3
Europe (Eurochart Hot 100)	3
Europe (European Dance Radio)	15
Finland (Suomen virallinen lista)	1
France (SNEP)	7
Germany (GfK)	2
Greece (Pop + Rock)	1
Iceland (Íslenski Listinn Topp 40)	4
Ireland (IRMA)	3
Israel (Israeli Singles Chart)	6
Italy (Musica e dischi)	18
Netherlands (Dutch Top 40)	12
Netherlands (Single Top 100)	13
New Zealand (Recorded Music NZ)	39
Norway (VG-lista)	1
Scottish Singles Sales (Official Charts)	5
Sweden (Sverigetopplistan)	4
Sweden (Swedish Dance Chart)	1
Switzerland (Schweizer Hitparade)	1
UK Singles (Official Charts)	3
UK Dance (Official Charts)	1
UK Airplay (Music Week)	30
US Billboard Hot 100	62
US Dance Club Songs (Billboard)	1
US Dance Singles Sales (Billboard)	2

Chart (2005)	Peak position
Greece (IFPI)	17
Ireland Dance (IRMA)	3

Chart (2006)	Peak position
Greece (IFPI)	28

Chart (2021)	Peak position
Hungary (Single Top 40)	31

Chart (2022)	Peak position
UK Singles Downloads (Official Charts)	4

=== Year-end charts ===
Chart (1996)	Position
Austria (Ö3 Austria Top 40)	21
Belgium (Ultratop 50 Flanders)	38
Belgium (Ultratop 50 Wallonia)	75
Europe (Eurochart Hot 100)	12
Germany (Media Control)	4
Iceland (Íslenski Listinn Topp 40)	71
Israel (Israeli Singles Chart)	45
Netherlands (Dutch Top 40)	59
Netherlands (Single Top 100)	59
Norway (VG-lista)	7
Sweden (Topplistan)	29
Sweden (Swedish Dance Chart)	4
Switzerland (Schweizer Hitparade)	2
UK Singles (OCC)	44

Chart (1997)	Position
Australia (ARIA)	87
Canada Dance/Urban (RPM)	4
Europe (Eurochart Hot 100)	76
France (SNEP)	61
UK Club Chart (Music Week)	35
US Dance Club Play (Billboard)	5
US Maxi-Singles Sales (Billboard)	8

== Certifications ==
Region	Certification	Certified units/sales
Australia (ARIA)	Gold	35,000^{^}
Belgium (BRMA)	Gold	25,000^{*}
France (SNEP)	Gold	250,000^{*}
Germany (BVMI)	Platinum	500,000^{^}
New Zealand (RMNZ)	Platinum	30,000^{‡}
Norway (IFPI Norway)	Platinum	20,000
Switzerland (IFPI Switzerland)	Gold	25,000^{^}
United Kingdom (BPI)	3× Platinum	1,800,000^{‡}
^{*} Sales figures based on certification alone.^{^} Shipments figures based on certification alone.^{‡} Sales+streaming figures based on certification alone.

== Release history ==
Region	Date	Format(s)	Label(s)	Ref.
United Kingdom	27 November 1995	12-inch vinyl; CD; cassette	Cheeky	
United Kingdom	14 October 1996	CD; cassette	Cheeky	
United Kingdom	28 October 1996	12-inch vinyl	Cheeky	
United States	25 February 1997	Rhythmic contemporary radio	Arista	
United Kingdom	5 September 2005	CD	Cheeky	

== 2005 mix ==
"Insomnia" was remixed and rereleased in 2005 after the re-entry of the 1996 single into the UK Singles Chart at number 48. This was partly because of Faithless releasing their greatest hits album. The remix was not used on the greatest hits with the Monster Mix being the version which featured on the album. The remixed version reached number 17 on the UK Singles Chart.

=== CD1 ===
1. "Insomnia" (Blissy vs. Armand Van Helden 2005 Rework) – 03:22
2. "Insomnia" (Monster Mix Radio Edit) – 03:36

=== CD2 ===
1. "Insomnia" (Blissy vs. Armand Van Helden 2005 Rework) – 03:22
2. "Insomnia" (Sasha B.A Remix) – 09:52
3. "Insomnia" (Armand's European Vacation Mix) – 08:03
4. "Insomnia" (Monster Mix) – 08:35

== Version 2.0 by Avicii ==
In 2015, Swedish DJ and record producer Avicii released a remix titled "Insomnia 2.0 (Avicii Remix)". The track was released on 24 July 2015 and reached the German charts. It was also featured on the Faithless 2.0 release in Avicii extended remix and Avicii radio exit remix formats (as well as the 1995 Monster Mix). "Insomnia 2.0" also went to number one on the US Dance chart.

== Mike Candys and Jack Holiday version ==
"Insomnia"

Single by Mike Candys and Jack Holiday

from the album Smile
- Released: 11 September 2009
- Recorded: 2009
- Genre: Electro house; Eurodance
- Length: 3:29
- Songwriters: Maxi Jazz; Sister Bliss; Rollo
- Producers: Mike Candys; Jack Holiday; Chris Crime

Mike Candys singles chronology
"Insomnia" (2009)	"Together Again" (2010)

Jack Holiday singles chronology
"Insomnia" (2009)	"Children 2012" (2012)

In 2009, Swiss DJs Mike Candys and Jack Holiday recorded their version of the song. It was released as a single in September 2009 and charted throughout Europe.

=== Track listing ===
CD maxi – Europe (2009)

1. "Insomnia" (Radio Edit) – 3:31
2. "Insomnia" (Chris Crime Infinity Remix) – 4:41
3. "Insomnia" (Christopher S. Remix) – 4:39

=== Charts ===
Chart (2009–12)	Peak position
Austria (Ö3 Austria Top 40)	41
Belgium (Ultratop 50 Flanders)	9
Belgium (Ultratop 50 Wallonia)	16
Denmark (Tracklisten)	2
France (SNEP)	15
Germany (GfK)	44
Luxembourg (Billboard)	5
Netherlands (Single Top 100)	30
Switzerland (Schweizer Hitparade)	34

== Maceo Plex version ==
In 2021, Cuban-American DJ Maceo Plex released a remix of the song.

== Disclosure version ==
In June 2024, Disclosure debuted an edit of Insomnia during the Glastonbury Festival in Somerset, England. Sister Bliss, one of the founders of Faithless, reached out to the duo encouraging them to officially release the edit. The Disclosure version was later released on November 14, 2025.

== See also ==
- List of number-one dance singles of 2015 (U.S.)

== Derivative works ==
Other artists used this track as inspiration to create their own.

- DJ The Crow : I’ve Got No Time (1997)
