= Marc et Claude =

German electro-trance music duo

- Origin: Germany
- Genres: Electro, Eurotrance, house
- Years active: 1993–2005
- Label: Marc et Claude's/Positiva/Orbit Records
- Past members: Marc Romboy; Klaus Derichs

Marc et Claude were a German electro-trance music duo consisting of Marc Romboy and Klaus Derichs. The two also co-own the label Alphabet City, which houses such artists as Ferry Corsten and Future Breeze. The two started producing seriously during the explosion of German trance in the mid-to-late 1990s. Their first release, "Toulouse" was on their own label, Le Petit Prince Records. In 1997, the duo teamed up with Jürgen Driessen and produced the track "La" which went to the top of the German dance charts and helped them crossover to UK audiences.

They had several UK top 40 hits during the late 1990s and early 2000s, including their biggest hit "I Need Your Lovin' (Like the Sunshine)" (#12) which samples the Korgis' "Everybody's Got to Learn Sometime" which served as a dedication to their summer tour, affiliated with the island of Ibiza.

== Discography ==
=== Albums ===
- 2003 - You Own the Sound

=== Singles ===
Year	Single	Peak chart positions		Certifications (sales thresholds)	Album
Year	Single	UK	GER	Certifications (sales thresholds)	Album
1993	"Party People"	—	—		Le Petit Prince
1993	"Deux Petites Differences"	—	—		Le Petit Prince
1997	"La"	28	—		—
1998	"Sunshower '98" (with Ralphie Dee)	—	—		—
1998	"How Much Can You Take? (Emotional)"	—	—		—
1999	"Ne"	—	—		—
2000	"I Need Your Lovin' (Like the Sunshine)"	12	81		—
2001	"Loving You"^{[I]}	37	71		You Own the Sound
2001	"The History of Acid House"	—	—		You Own the Sound
2001	"Tremble"	29	47		You Own the Sound
2002	"Feel You"	—	76		You Own the Sound
2002	"It's All for Love/You Own the Sound"	—	—		You Own the Sound
2003	"Free Spirit"	—	—		You Own the Sound
2005	"Free"	—	—		—
"—" denotes releases that did not chart

Notes:

- I "Loving You" was remixed and re-released in 2003, under the name "Loving You 2003". It is this version that charted on both the German and UK charts.
