= Maria Nayler =

British singer

- Born: Maria Nayler; 26 March 1972 (age 54); Ashingdon, England
- Genres: Trance, pop
- Occupation: Vocalist
- Label: DeConstruction Records

Maria Nayler is a British trance singer. She is known for featuring on Robert Miles' cover of the song "One and One".

== Career ==
In the early 1990s, Nayler was part of Ultraviolet, who released two singles, "Kites" (1990) and "I Wish That" (1991).

In 1995, she appeared as featured vocalist on Sasha's trance track "Be as One". It received a release through Deconstruction Records in early 1996, peaking at number 17 on the UK Singles Chart. Later that same year, Nayler teamed up with electronic dance musician Robert Miles, who applied her vocals to the international hit song "One and One", the third single taken from Miles' album Dreamland. "One and One" topped the charts in Italy and Belgium and peaked at No. 3 in the UK, Ireland, Sweden, and Norway.

In 1998, Nayler signed a solo recording contract with DeConstruction Records and released "Naked and Sacred", a cover version of the Chynna Phillips song. Featuring the B-side "The Other Side", produced by Sasha, as well as a speed garage remix from Tim Deluxe, "Naked and Sacred" reached No. 32 in the UK. In July 1998, she was the support act for Kylie Minogue on the only UK dates of her Intimate and Live Tour – at the Shepherd's Bush Empire.

The double A-side "Love Is the God"/"Will You Be with Me" was issued in August 1998 and peaked at No. 65. An album sampler containing "Naked and Sacred", the full-length version of "Love Is the God" and the original version of "Will You Be with Me" was released in 1998 which also contained the track "Inside My Universe". A sampler CD released by DeConstruction also contained the track "Who's Loving Who", which was later covered by Charlotte Church on her album Tissues and Issues, retitled "Even God". In 2000, Nayler returned with "Angry Skies", which was produced by Tilt. The track reached No. 42 on the UK Singles Chart. The second 12" also featured the Sasha-produced "She".

In 2007, "Angry Skies" was re-released on Lost Language. Nayler appeared in series 21 episode 1 of Never Mind the Buzzcocks as a mystery guest. Then in 2009, Nayler performed the vocals on the trance song "We Belong", composed by Ferry Corsten on his Twice in a Blue Moon album, and featured on Dutch radio show A State of Trance. She appeared at PlanetLove, Shane's Castle in September.

Nayler's solo album She was recorded in the late 1990s but was shelved by DeConstruction when they learnt of her pregnancy. It was released in January 2023.

== Discography ==
=== Albums ===
- 2023: She
- 2025: There's a Rising Sun (EP) with Raz Nitzan and Costa, Amsterdam Trance Records

=== Singles ===
- 1990: "Kites" (as Ultraviolet) UK #122
- 1991: "I Wish That" (as Ultraviolet) UK #99
- 1995: "Be as One" (with Sasha) – UK #17
- 1996: "One and One" (with Robert Miles) – UK #3
- 1998: "Naked and Sacred" – UK #32
- 1998: "Will You Be with Me"/"Love Is the God" – UK #65
- 1998: "Inside My Universe"
- 2000: "Angry Skies" – UK #42
- 2002: "Headstrong" (with Tilt)
- 2002: "Babyland (with Motion 3)
- 2003: "Child of Life" (with Tastexperience)
- 2003: "Free Spirit" (with Marc Et Claude)
- 2004: "Over Again" (with Odessi aka Parks & Wilson and Leama)
- 2006: "21st Century Lover" (with Killahurtz)
- 2007: "Angry Skies 2007" (with Tilt)
- 2009: "We Belong" (with Ferry Corsten)
- 2009: "Perfect Sky" (with Espen Gulbrandsen and DJ Julian Vincent)
- 2011: "The Music in You" (with Tilt)
- 2012: "One & One 2012" (with Loverush UK!)
- 2012: "My Release" (with Tilt)
- 2012: "Wild" (with Glassesboys from the album From Our House)
- 2013: "Damage" (with Paul Morrell)
- 2014: "Lifetime When Right" (with Tenishia)
- 2015: "Calming Rain" (with Kyau & Albert)
- 2015: "Lifetime" (with Just Arnold & Mischa Samuel)
- 2015: "No Mistakes" (with Rafael Frost)
- 2015: "Still I Feel" (with Bart Claessen)
- 2016: "Superstar" (with Damien S)
- 2017: "A Second Breath" (with Mino Safy)
- 2017: "The Beauty of the Night" (with Nitrous Oxide)
- 2017: "More Than a Photograph" (with Jericho Frequency)
- 2017: "Nothing Breaks Like a Heart" (with Raz Nitzan)
- 2019: "Damage" Remixes (with Paul Morrell)
