= 23am =

Studio album by Robert Miles
- Released: December 1, 1997 (EU); December 16, 1997 (US)
- Recorded: Plus XXX Studios, Paris
- Genre: Electronica; ambient; pop; chill-out; dance
- Length: 60:56
- Label: Deconstruction; Arista
- Producer: Robert Miles

Robert Miles chronology
Dreamland (1996)	23am (1997)	Organik (2001)

Singles from 23am
- 1. "Freedom" Released: 1997; 2. "Full Moon" Released: 1998; 3. "Everyday Life" Released: 1998

Professional ratings
Review scores
Source	Rating
AllMusic	3/5 stars
Music Week	3/5 stars
Q	3/5 stars

23am is the second studio album by composer Robert Miles, released in late 1997 via Deconstruction and Arista labels.

== Background and recording ==
The composition of 23am began from the Dreamland tour, during which Miles collected audio samples from virtually every city visited. Aside from being based on his experiences of these travels (in the liner notes Miles emphasizes the influence seeing in person so many problems that society has brought onto itself had), Miles has also said that the album reflects the human life cycle from birth to death.

23am also contains four vocal songs, a ratio of vocals to instrumentals that is almost equal to that of Dreamland. They seem to have been less an afterthought for this album, though, and were written in Italian and then translated into English. Two tracks on the album, including its first single "Freedom", feature vocals by disco icon Kathy Sledge of the chart-topping group Sister Sledge.

The structures and instrumental arrangements on 23am are more complex than those on the earlier Dreamland, involving real instruments such as the saxophone and trumpet as an addition to the synthesizers. The music is also much less beat-driven; the main sections of a number of the vocal-based songs are structured like pop songs, while the segueing interludes between songs are generally structureless, with no beats at all. Ultimately it can be said that 23am is more artistic and less dance-oriented than its predecessor, Dreamland. At the same time, however, 23am was less successful than Dreamland.

== Track listing ==
All tracks are written by Roberto Concina (Robert Miles), except where noted.

No.	Title	Writer(s)	Length
1.	"Introducing"		3:25
2.	"A New Flower" (vocals: Barbara Prunas; Robert Miles)		5:58
3.	"Everyday Life" (vocals: Nancy Danino)	Roberto Concina; Frank Musker	10:29
4.	"Freedom" (vocals: Kathy Sledge)	Concina; Musker	5:51
5.	"Textures"		3:14
6.	"Enjoy" (vocals: Kathy Sledge)	Concina; Musker	5:55
7.	"Flying Away"		4:59
8.	"Heatwave"		5:56
9.	"Maresias"		5:48
10.	"Full Moon" (vocals: Nancy Danino)	Concina; Musker	6:59
11.	"Leaving Behind..."		2:21
Total length:			60:56

== Personnel ==
- Robert Miles – keyboards, programming, vocals, mixing, production
- Denys Lable – electric guitar
- Michel Gaucher – saxophone
- Eric Giausserand – trumpet
- Barbara Prunas, Kathy Sledge, Nancy Danino – vocals
- Katie Kissoon, Shirley Lewis, Emily Strode – backing vocals
- Robin Hancock, Jaybee Eglantine – engineering

== Charts ==
=== Weekly charts ===
Chart (1998)	Peak position
Hungarian Albums (MAHASZ)	36
