= Organik =

Studio album by Robert Miles
- Released: 11 June 2001
- Recorded: 1999 in Ibiza, 2000-2001 in London
- Genre: Trip hop; chill-out; trance
- Length: 63:59
- Label: Salt Records; SALT CD 001 Shakti/Narada/Virgin/EMI Records; 7243 8 50956 2 7 V2-50956 (US)
- Producer: Robert Miles

Robert Miles chronology
23am (1997)	Organik (2001)	Organik Remixes (2002)

Professional ratings
Review scores
Source	Rating
AllMusic	4/5 stars
Alternative Press	8/10
Drowned in Sound	7/10
Q	3/5 stars

Organik is the third studio album by Robert Miles, released on 11 June 2001. The first he independently recorded and produced after quitting his record company, it marked a complete departure from the style of his first two albums but still received overwhelmingly positive reviews.

== Overview ==
Organik was composed and arranged during the summer of 1999 at Can Maresa in Ibiza, then recorded and mixed across seventeen months from 2000 to 2001 at Muchmoremusic Studios in London. Self-released on Salt Records, it is also available from Narada, Shakti Records (U.S.), and DBX Records.

The title "TSBOL" stands for "That Small Bubble of Life". It is derived from the sample used in the track intro: " Time to work. Time to relax. Time to reflect... Look down. Look down. That fragile bubble of life float on a sea of nothing: [Spaceship Earth.] ".

== Track listing ==
1. "TSBOL" – 3:44
2. "Separation" – 4:32
3. "Paths" – 4:00
4. "Wrong" – 5:26
5. "It's All Coming Back" – 4:10
6. "Pour te Parler" – 4:21
7. "Trance Shapes" – 3:55
8. "Connections" – 4:57
9. "Release Me" – 7:48
10. "Improvisations Part 1" – 7:06
11. "Improvisations Part 2" – 5:53
12. "Endless" – 8:00

== Personnel ==
All tracks written by Robert Miles (born Roberto Concina), except track 3 written by Robert Miles and Smoke City (Nina Miranda, Marc Brown, Chris Franck).

Musical

- Robert Miles – keyboards (on 1-12)
- Paul Falloon – bass guitar (on 1-2, 4-8)
- Nitin Sawhney – electric guitar (on 4, 7), nylon guitar (on 6)
- Bill Laswell – fretless bass (on 9-11)
- Gianni Trevisan – electric guitar (on 2)
- Taylor Made – acoustic bass (on 3, 9)
- Trilok Gurtu – drums and percussion & tabla (on 9-11)
- Marque Gilmore – drums (on 1, 4, 6-7)
- Nina Miranda – vocals (on 3)
- Dhruba Ghosh – sarangi (on 3, 9, 12)
- The London Session Orchestra – 20-piece strings (on 1, 4, 6)

Technical

- Robert Miles – arranger, programming, engineer, producer
- Nick Ingman – string arrangements (on 1, 4, 6)
- Toni Economides – additional production, engineer
- Michael Fossenkemper – mastering

Samples

- On 1, public domain sample from "Scenes of Earth and life on Earth" in One Small Step, by R. Lynn Bondurant, NASA, 1970.
- On 3, extract and lyrics from "Many Paths" by Smoke City.
- On 5, samples recorded in Mnemba Island, Tanzania, January 1998.
- On 11, extracts from "Nagual Session" by Pianeta Terra (G. peres, G. Trevisan, A. Marchesan), July 1999.
- On 12, samples recorded in Can Maresa, Ibiza, summer 1999.
