= Evelyn Zangger =

Swiss singer-songwriter (born 1980)

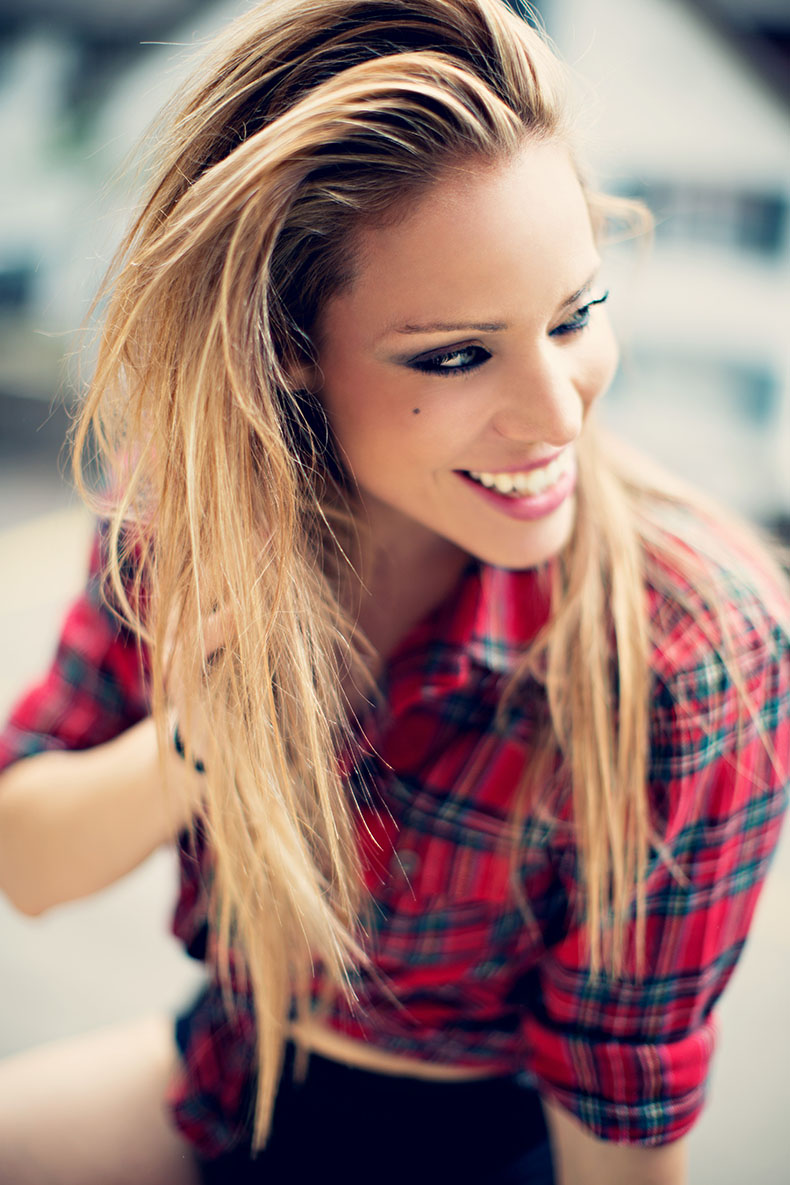
Evelyn Zangger

Evelyn Zangger (born 6 December 1980) is a Swiss singer-songwriter from Zurich.
