= Urban Soul Orchestra =

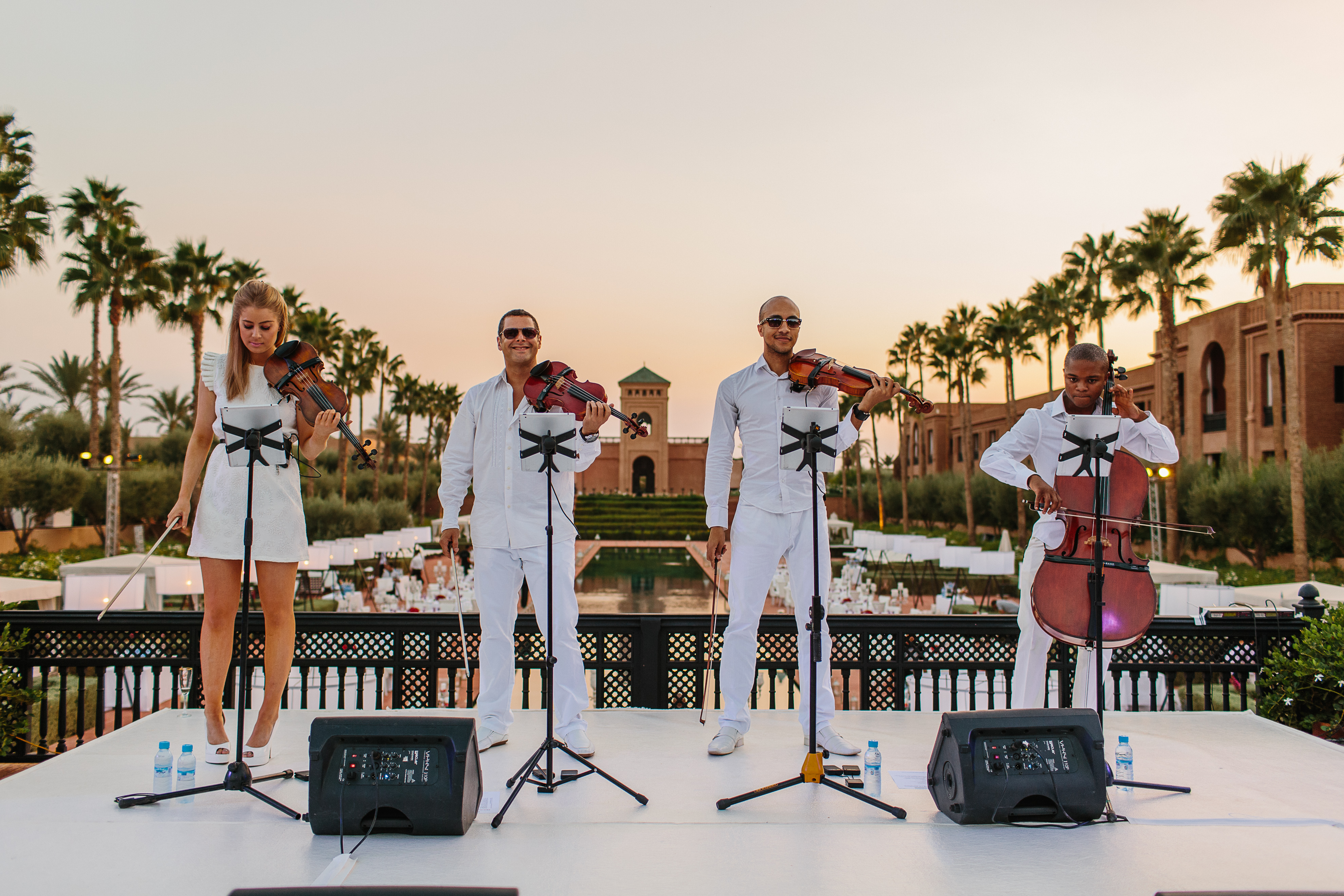
Urban Soul Orchestra performing in Marrakech.

The Independent describes Urban Soul Orchestra as a "contemporary string ensemble with a repertoire of funky arrangements". Their discography includes artists ranging from classical, jazz, funk, soul, dance and contemporary music.

== History ==
In 2000, The Times described the 'Urban Soul Orchestra' as a "collective of session musicians which numbers anything from four to 40 players", and is co-directed by Stephen Hussey and Natasha Beckman."

Stephen Hussey was born in London in 1967 and is of "mixed Zimbabwean and English heritage". He studied the violin and piano at the Guildhall School of Music and Drama.

Hussey began his professional career with the Reggae Philharmonic Orchestra (RPO), arranging and co-arranging the strings for artists such as Soul II Soul, Gabrielle and Maxi Priest. Hussey went on to become a renowned string arranger in his own right, forming Urban Soul Orchestra, and collaborating with an extensive range of international artists and composers.

The Urban Soul Orchestra has performed or recorded with: Leona Lewis, Groove Armada, Jay-Z, Keane, Il Divo, Oasis,The Script, Grace Jones, Mika, Maxi Priest, and Nitin Sawhney. Urban Soul Orchestra has orchestrated many tracks that have been used as TV and film underscore including Nightmares on Wax ‘Les Nuits’, Octave One ‘Blackwater’ (BBC idents) and Black Connection ‘Give Me Rhythm’ (Titles for C4's ‘Clubbervision’) In 2011 Urban Soul Orchestra's Stephen Hussey conducted the score for BBC1's Human Planet series, composed by Nitin Sawhney.

Beckman joined the orchestra in 2008. In 2009, Urban Soul Orchestra performed at the Cannes Film Festival, which Oscar winner Penélope Cruz hosted. Also in 2009 they performed at the Basel Art Fair and WOMAD. They also debuted their USO Big Band set, featuring live band, orchestra and vocalists, at the Oval Hall of the National Museum of Catalan Art in Barcelona.

In 2010-2015 performances included the Monaco Grand Prix, Venice Biennale, Wimbledon Ball (regular annual commitment), Queen's Club Ball, Pride of Britain Awards (2011 - 2013), the Thames Diamond Jubilee Pageant, BBC Children In Need, The Jonathan Ross Show and Top Of The Pops New Years Day special supporting Jess Glynne and Radio 1's Live Lounge with Ella Eyre. At the latter event they debuted their "Best of British" set which went on to be performed extensively, including at major sponsor events around the opening and closing ceremonies of London 2012 a residency at the Royal Opera House and the Paralympics.

USO were part of the 50th year of Jamaican Independence celebrations in 2012, performing with the Jazz Jamaica All Stars and Brinsley Forde as part of the Catch A Fire project - a tribute to Bob Marley's iconic album, Catch A Fire. The tour visited cities including Nottingham, Southampton, Birmingham, London (QE II Hall, Southbank Centre) Leeds, Leicester and Edinburgh. A special reunion performance was staged at the Royal Festival Hall on 13 July 2013. The sold out show was nominated for a 2013 MOBO Award for Best Jazz Act.

In 2012-13 USO were featured in many publications including Tatler the Sunday Times and OK! Magazine. In 2014 USO played on Annie Lennox's Album Nostalgia and performed with her on BBC's Strictly Come Dancing and The Jo Whiley Show. In 2016 Urban Soul Orchestra also were announced as the "World's Most Prestigious Event Supplier" in the Prestigious Star Awards.

In 2016 USO performed their first Classic Ibiza Show at Blickling Hall in Norfolk.

In 2017, due to the success of the event, USO continued their Classic Ibiza Shows, this time in four locations; Bowood House in Wiltshire, Blickling Hall in Norfolk, Knebworth House in Hertfordshire and Bolesworth Castle in Cheshire. Two of the shows were in association with Ministry Of Sound. In conjunction with the Classic Ibiza Shows, USO released their Classic Ibiza Album. The album reflects many of the tracks performed at the show and includes an original composition,'Soul Of The World'.

In 2018 USO expanded their Classic Ibiza Shows to seven locations; Capesthorne Hall in Cheshire, Ragley Hall in Warwickshire, Harewood House in Leeds, Windsor Racecourse in Berkshire, Bowood House in Wiltshire, Blickling Hall in Norfolk and Hatfield House in Hertfordshire. These shows were again in association with Ministry Of Sound.

2019 saw the shows expand further to twelve iconic locations with an audience of 65, 000. In 2019 the Orchestra also performed as part of Respect, The Aretha Franklin Songbook and continued their Music Industry work with artists such as Liam Gallagher, Groove Armada, Tom Odell and Jade Bird.

== Discography ==
See Urban Soul Orchestra discography
