= Children (composition) =

1995 single by Robert Miles

- Artwork for Italian single releases

Single by Robert Miles

from the album Dreamland
- Released: 13 November 1995
- Recorded: 1994
- Genre: Eurodance; dream trance; ambient house
- Length: 7:35 (original version); 4:03 (radio edit)
- Label: DBX
- Songwriter: Roberto Concina
- Producer: Robert Miles

Robert Miles singles chronology
| "Red Zone" (1995) | "Children" (1995) | "Fable" (1996) |

Music video
- "Children" on YouTube

Audio sample
- "Children": file; help

"Children" is an instrumental composition by Italian composer Robert Miles. It was first released in Italy in January 1995 as part of the EP Soundtracks on Joe T. Vannelli's DBX label, but it did not chart. Vannelli brought the track to a nightclub in Miami where it was heard by Simon Berry of Platipus Records. Berry worked with Vannelli and James Barton (of Liverpool's Cream nightclub) to release the composition in November 1995 as the lead single from Miles's debut album, Dreamland (1996). "Children" was certified gold and platinum in several countries and reached number one in more than 12 countries; it was Europe's most successful single of 1996. Two different music videos were produced to accompany the song, directed by Matt Amos and Elizabeth Bailey, respectively. In 2025, Billboard magazine ranked "Children" among "The 100 Best Dance Songs of All Time".

== Background and writing ==
Miles gave two inspirations for the writing of "Children". One was as a response to photographs of child Bosnian war victims that his father had brought home from a humanitarian mission in the former Yugoslavia; and the other, inspired by his career as a DJ, was to create a track to end DJ sets, intended to calm rave attendants prior to their driving home as a means to reduce car accident deaths. "Children" cost £150 to record.

"Children" is one of the pioneering tracks of dream trance, a genre of electronic dance music characterized by dream-like piano melodies, and a steady four-on-the-floor bass drum. The creation of dream trance was a response to social pressures in Italy during the early 1990s: the growth of rave culture among young adults, and the ensuing popularity of nightclub attendance, had created a weekly trend of deaths due to car accidents as clubbers drove across the country overnight, falling asleep at the wheel from strenuous dancing as well as alcohol and drug use. In mid-1996, deaths due to this phenomenon, called strage del sabato sera ("Saturday night slaughter") in Italy, were being estimated at 2,000 since the start of the decade. The decision by DJs like Miles to end their sets with slower, more calming music—intended to offset the high-energy, repetitive tracks played earlier—was met with approval from both authorities and the parents of car crash victims.

Critic Boris Barabanov claimed a similarity between "Children" and Russian singer Garik Sukachov's song "Напои меня водой" ("Napoi menia vodoi" – "Quench my thirst"), and says the song was written before "Children". Sukachov said that he gave his consent for the melody to be used, though there are doubts on that.

== Critical response ==
"Children" received widespread acclaim from critics, with many calling the track a masterpiece. AllMusic editor Jose F. Promis described it as "magical". Billboard attributes its widespread success to its melodic nature, characterized by an "instantly recognizable" piano riff (which was not in the track's original version). They identify this factor as making the track accessible to a broader audience beyond clubbers and fans of electronic dance music alone by means of radio airplay. The magazine's Larry Flick noted that Miles "wisely takes his time unraveling his melody, letting it breathe over an urgent, nu-NRG beat and coloring it with twinkling electro effects and vibrant synths. Joyous and invigorating as can be, "Children" deserves to be one of those rare records that never fades beyond recurrent status on any DJ's playlist. We need to hear more from Miles ... and we need to hear it now." Daina Darzin from Cash Box viewed it as "a trancey, dramatic dance track". Dave Sholin from the Gavin Report wrote, "In the time it takes you to listen to this song, another nation has probably taken this remarkable instrumental to the top of their chart. Name a country, and it's likely Number One there right now. And now the music of this classically trained Italian pianist/producer is set to descend on the airwaves and dance floors in the U.S.A. The melody is hypnotic." James Hamilton from Music Week's RM Dance Update deemed it a "trancey Italian 'dream music' instrumental". A reviewer from People Magazine called it a "techno-requiem". Synthmania.com, which identifies "Children" as being written on a Kurzweil K2000, calls this the "dream house piano" sound, consisting of "standard piano, synth bass and string/pad sounds bathed in delay and reverb".

== Chart performance ==
"Children" was first released in Italy in January 1995 on Joe T. Vanelli's DBX imprint label, as part of the Soundtracks EP. Subsequently, following exposure at a gathering of DJs and record producers in Miami, the track was licensed by the UK-based Platipus Records who were represented by UK licensing agency Dynamik Music. In conjunction with Miles' manager, Gavin Prunas, the track was licensed to Deconstruction Records; it was then licensed to more than a dozen additional record labels in Europe through DBX, Deconstruction as well as appearing on the Platipus Records Volume 2 compilation released worldwide via Dynamik Music.

"Children" was a success worldwide, peaking at number one in more than 12 countries and holding that position for several weeks. "Children" reached number one in the following countries: Austria (six weeks), Belgium, Denmark, Finland (three weeks), France (11 weeks), Italy, Norway (five weeks), Germany, Scotland (three weeks), Spain, Sweden (seven weeks) and Switzerland (13 weeks); beyond that, according to Billboard magazine, it reached the top five in "every European country that has a singles chart". It spent 13 weeks at number one on the Eurochart Hot 100, reached number two on the UK staying 17 weeks on the chart, and it reached number 21 in the US, holding that position for four weeks. Along with U2 members Adam Clayton and Larry Mullen Jr.'s reworking of the Mission: Impossible theme, it marked the first time since November 1985 that two instrumentals had simultaneously charted in the top 30 of the Billboard Hot 100. The song reached number five in Australia and number four in New Zealand.

French nightclubs began playing the imported record from Italy in 1995, making France one of the first countries to popularize the track. Spreading through the underground from clubs to, eventually, the radio, it was licensed there by an independent record label in November 1995. Spain and Italy itself were the other early adopters that brought the track into clubs. Club charts in these countries signalled "Children"'s popularity to other countries: In Denmark, club and radio play followed the single's release, while in Belgium radio play only followed by crossing over from club play, and in the Netherlands radio play was the primary factor in the single's promotion. In Germany, a domestic release came after demand built up from club play through promotional releases from the UK and Italy.

In the United Kingdom, BBC Radio 1 did not play "Children" on its daytime playlist at first, though Radio 1 DJ Pete Tong did play it for three weeks in a row on his Essential Selection program in 1996. Tong's appointing it Essential Tune of The Week each week for three weeks in a row culminated in a frenzied bidding war amongst UK major record companies. Meanwhile, Kiss FM was among the first to play it, even using it in one of the station's minute-long television commercials. "Children" reached the number two position on the UK Singles Chart prior to promotion and marketing, and became the year's eighth best-selling single.

== Music videos ==
Billboard ascribes the final stage of the composition's promotion to the airing of its accompanying music video on music television networks such as MTV Europe and Germany's VIVA. Two videos were produced, the first was directed by Matt Amos and premiered in November 1995. It features black-and-white footage of a small girl riding in a car through a diverse range of landscape. The locations are London (Piccadilly Circus and Trafalgar Square), Paris (the Eiffel Tower can be seen), Geneva (place du Molard, rue Coutance), Morges (marina with small towers) and countryside in Switzerland (where Miles was born), and France and Italy near the Mont-Blanc Tunnel.

The second video, filmed on location in New York, was directed by Elizabeth Bailey and premiered in February 1996. It was filmed in colour and alternates between images of Miles DJing at a nightclub rave and images of children at play, thereby touching upon both of the themes of the instrumental.

== Impact and legacy ==
In the 1999 Neo-Geo game, Fatal Fury: Mark of the Wolves, the track Spread The Wings has a part to it that references the main tune. Upon including the track on 2002's The Very Best of Euphoria compilation, TheManAdam, co-creator of the Euphoria series of trance DJ mix albums, said that it "had a major influence on [his] generation of remixers and producers when [they] all at first started making trance". American entertainment company BuzzFeed listed "Children" at number 41 in their list of "The 101 Greatest Dance Songs Of the '90s" in 2017. In 2018, Mixmag ranked it among "The 15 Best Mid-90s Trance Tracks", writing, "The track was inspired by photographs of young victims of the Yugoslav war and a desire to relax ravegoers before driving home to reduce car accident deaths. These intentions shine through. Sadly the producer passed away last year, but he showed the world the depth of feeling trance is capable of evoking." In 2023, Switch Disco and English singer-songwriter Ella Henderson heavily sampled "Children" for their single "React". In March 2025, Billboard magazine ranked the song number 59 in their list of "The 100 Best Dance Songs of All Time".

== Track listings ==
- CD single, France
1. "Children" (Eat Me Edit) – 4:03
2. "Children" (Dream Radio Edit) – 4:00
- CD maxi, Belgium & Netherlands
1. "Children" (Radio Edit) – 3:49
2. "Children" (Dream Version) – 7:35
3. "Children" (Original Mix / Guitar Mix) – 7:17
- CD maxi, France
1. "Children" (Eat Me Edit) – 4:06
2. "Children" (Dream Radio Edit) – 4:00
3. "Children" (Dream Club Version) – 7:35
4. "Children" (Original Mix / Guitar Mix) – 7:17
5. "Children" (Message Version) – 6:51
- CD maxi, Germany
1. "Children" (Dream Version) – 7:35
2. "Children" (Original Mix / Guitar Mix) – 7:17
3. "Children" (Message Version) – 6:51
- CD maxi, UK, US, Mexico, Japan & South Africa
1. "Children" (Eat Me Edit) – 4:06
2. "Children" (Dream Version) – 7:35
3. "Children" (Original Mix / Guitar Mix) – 7:17
4. "Children" (Message Version) – 6:51
- 7-inch, US
1. "Children" (dream radio) – 4:00
2. "One and One" – 4:00
- 12-inch maxi, Europe
1. "Children" (dream version) – 7:50
2. "Children" (original version) – 6:50
3. "Children" (message version) – 6:50
- 12-inch maxi, UK
1. "Children" – 7:30
2. "Children" (vocal mix) – 6:50
3. "Children" (guitar mix) – 7:21
- 12-inch maxi, US
1. "Children" (full length mix) – 7:30
2. "Children" (radio edit) – 4:00
3. "Children" (guitar mix) – 7:21
4. "Children" (message version) – 6:50
- Cassette
1. "Children" (eat me edit) – 4:00
2. "Children" (guitar mix) – 7:21
3. "Children" (eat me edit) – 4:00
4. "Children" (guitar mix) – 7:21
- Alfredo Nini
1. "Children" – 5:48

== Charts ==
=== Weekly charts ===
| Chart (1995–1996) | Peak position |
|---|---|
| Australia (ARIA) | 5 |
| Austria (Ö3 Austria Top 40) | 1 |
| Belgium (Ultratop 50 Flanders) | 2 |
| Belgium (Ultratop 50 Wallonia) | 1 |
| Canada Top Singles (RPM) | 21 |
| Canada Dance/Urban (RPM) | 1 |
| Canada (Nielsen SoundScan) | 11 |
| Czech Republic (IFPI CR) | 4 |
| Denmark (IFPI) | 1 |
| Estonia (Eesti Top 20) | 2 |
| Europe (Eurochart Hot 100) | 1 |
| Europe Border Breakers (Music & Media) | 1 |
| European Dance Radio (Music & Media) | 1 |
| European Hit Radio (Music & Media) | 5 |
| Finland (Suomen virallinen lista) | 1 |
| France (SNEP) | 1 |
| Germany (GfK) | 1 |
| Hungary (Mahasz) | 5 |
| Iceland (Íslenski Listinn Topp 40) | 1 |
| Ireland (IRMA) | 2 |
| Israel (Israeli Singles Chart) | 1 |
| Italy (Musica e dischi) | 1 |
| Italy Airplay (Music & Media) | 9 |
| Japan (Oricon) | 6 |
| Latvia (Latvijas Top 20) | 1 |
| Netherlands (Dutch Top 40) | 3 |
| Netherlands (Single Top 100) | 3 |
| New Zealand (Recorded Music NZ) | 4 |
| Norway (VG-lista) | 1 |
| Scottish Singles Sales (Official Charts) | 1 |
| Spain (AFYVE) | 1 |
| Sweden (Sverigetopplistan) | 1 |
| Sweden (Swedish Dance Chart) | 5 |
| Switzerland (Schweizer Hitparade) | 1 |
| UK Singles (Official Charts) | 2 |
| UK Dance (Official Charts) | 1 |
| UK Airplay (Music Week) | 18 |
| UK Club Chart (Music Week) | 11 |
| UK Pop Tip Club Chart (Music Week) | 4 |
| US Billboard Hot 100 | 21 |
| US Adult Pop Airplay (Billboard) | 23 |
| US Dance Club Songs (Billboard) | 1 |
| US Dance Singles Sales (Billboard) | 6 |
| US Pop Airplay (Billboard) | 17 |
| US Rhythmic Airplay (Billboard) | 32 |
| US Cash Box Top 100 | 14 |

| Chart (2017) | Peak position |
|---|---|
| Hungary (Single Top 40) | 23 |
| Switzerland (Schweizer Hitparade) | 28 |

| Chart (2024–2025) | Peak position |
|---|---|
| Poland Airplay (OLiS) | 77 |

=== Year-end charts ===
| Chart (1996) | Position |
|---|---|
| Australia (ARIA) | 32 |
| Austria (Ö3 Austria Top 40) | 4 |
| Belgium (Ultratop 50 Flanders) | 4 |
| Belgium (Ultratop 50 Wallonia) | 6 |
| Canada Dance/Urban (RPM) | 1 |
| Europe (Eurochart Hot 100) | 1 |
| France (SNEP) | 7 |
| Germany (Media Control) | 2 |
| Iceland (Íslenski Listinn Topp 40) | 32 |
| Israel (Israeli Singles Chart) | 7 |
| Italy (Musica e dischi) | 1 |
| Netherlands (Dutch Top 40) | 8 |
| Netherlands (Single Top 100) | 16 |
| New Zealand (RIANZ) | 31 |
| Norway (VG-lista) | 12 |
| Sweden (Topplistan) | 4 |
| Swedish Dance Chart (TOPP40) | 28 |
| Switzerland (Schweizer Hitparade) | 3 |
| UK Singles (OCC) | 8 |
| US Billboard Hot 100 | 65 |
| US Dance Club Play (Billboard) | 27 |
| US Maxi-Singles Sales (Billboard) | 15 |
| US Top 40/Mainstream (Billboard) | 65 |

=== Decade-end charts ===
| Chart (1990–1999) | Rank |
|---|---|
| Austria (Ö3 Austria Top 40) | 54 |
| Belgium (Ultratop 50 Flanders) | 39 |

== Certifications ==
| Region | Certification | Certified units/sales |
|---|---|---|
| Australia (ARIA) | Gold | 35,000^{^} |
| Belgium (BRMA) | Platinum | 50,000^{*} |
| Denmark (IFPI Danmark) | Gold | 45,000^{‡} |
| France (SNEP) | Platinum | 500,000^{*} |
| Germany (BVMI) | Platinum | 500,000^{^} |
| Italy (FIMI) | Gold | 35,000^{‡} |
| Netherlands (NVPI) | Gold | 50,000^{^} |
| New Zealand (RMNZ) | Platinum | 30,000^{‡} |
| Norway (IFPI Norway) | Platinum | |
| Spain (Promusicae) | Gold | 30,000^{‡} |
| Sweden (GLF) | Gold | 25,000^{^} |
| Switzerland (IFPI Switzerland) | Platinum | 50,000^{^} |
| United Kingdom (BPI) | 3× Platinum | 1,800,000^{‡} |
^{*} Sales figures based on certification alone.^{^} Shipments figures based on certification alone.^{‡} Sales+streaming figures based on certification alone.

== Release history ==
| Region | Version | Date | Format(s) | Label(s) | Ref. |
|---|---|---|---|---|---|
| Italy | Soundtracks EP | January 1995 | 12-inch vinyl | DBX | |
| United Kingdom | "Children" | 13 November 1995 | 12-inch vinyl | Platipus | |
| United Kingdom | "Children" | 12 February 1996 | 12-inch vinyl; CD; Cassette | Deconstruction | |
| United States | "Children" | 9 April 1996 | Contemporary hit radio | Arista | |
| Japan | "Children" | 21 June 1996 | CD | Deconstruction; BMG | |

== 4 Clubbers version ==
"Children"

Single by 4 Clubbers
- B-side: "Remix"
- Released: 2001
- Genre: Trance
- Length: 3:38
- Label: Dropout
- Songwriter: Roberto Concina

4 Clubbers singles chronology
| "Children" (2001) | "Someday" (2002) |

In 2001, German trance group 4 Clubbers remixed the song and released it as a single. It reached the top 20 in Spain and charted in France, Germany, the Netherlands, and the United Kingdom.

=== Music video ===
A music video was produced to accompany the 4 Clubbers version. Filmed in a desaturated, near-monochrome style, it portrays children and elderly people enjoying various activities in a coastal town. The video alternates between scenes of them playing football on a field, using playground equipment, riding bikes and scooters along a promenade, and playing on a beach with the ocean. A central theme is the intergenerational connection, as the elderly individuals are shown actively participating and sharing in the joy of the children.

=== Track listing ===
1. "Children" (Club Radio Edit) – 3:38
2. "Children" (FB vs. JJ Radio Edit) – 3:28
3. "Children" (Club Mix) – 9:00
4. "Children" (Future Breeze vs. Junkfood Junkies Mix) – 7:49

=== Weekly charts ===
| Chart (2002) | Peak position |
|---|---|
| France (SNEP) | 72 |
| Germany (GfK) | 39 |
| Netherlands (Single Top 100) | 47 |
| Spain (AFYVE) | 18 |
| Switzerland (Schweizer Hitparade) | 86 |
| UK Singles (OCC) | 45 |

== Jack Holiday and Mike Candys version ==
"Children 2012"

Single by Jack Holiday and Mike Candys

from the album Smile
- Released: 2012
- Genre: Electro house
- Length: 3:07
- Songwriter: Roberto Concina

Jack Holiday singles chronology
| "Insomnia" (2009) | "Children 2012" (2012) | "The Riddle Anthem" (2012) |

Mike Candys singles chronology
| "Around the World" (2011) | "Children 2012" (2012) | "2012 (If the World Would End)" (2012) |

In 2012, Jack Holiday and Mike Candys released their version of "Children" as a single, titled "Children 2012".

=== Track listing ===
1. "Children" (Radio Edit) – 3:07
2. "Children" (Christopher S Radio Edit) – 3:08
3. "Children" (Original Higher Level Mix) – 5:00
4. "Children" (Christopher S Remix) – 5:35
5. "Children" (Mike'N'Jack Club Mix) – 4:56
6. "Children" (Steam Loco Mix) – 4:57

=== Weekly charts ===
| Chart (2012) | Peak position |
|---|---|
| Belgium (Ultratip Bubbling Under Flanders) | 54 |
| Belgium (Ultratip Bubbling Under Wallonia) | 22 |
| France (SNEP) | 54 |

== See also ==
- List of number-one dance singles of 1996 (U.S.)
