= Robert Miles =

Swiss-Italian record producer (1969–2017)

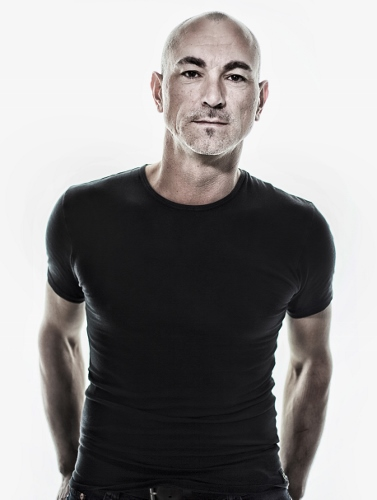
- Miles in 2014

Background information
- Also known as: Roberto Milani
- Born: Roberto Concina; 3 November 1969; Fleurier, Neuchâtel, Switzerland
- Origin: Fagagna, Friuli, Italy
- Died: 9 May 2017 (aged 47) Ibiza, Spain
- Genres: Trance, Dream Trance, House
- Occupations: Record producer; composer; musician; DJ
- Years active: 1994–2017
- Labels: Salt; Deconstruction; BMG; Arista; Shakti; Narada; Virgin; EMI

Roberto Concina (Italian pronunciation: [roˈbɛrto ˈkontʃina]; 3 November 1969 – 9 May 2017), known professionally as Robert Miles, was an Italian record producer, composer, musician, and DJ. His 1995 composition "Children" topped the charts worldwide.

== Early life ==
Robert Miles was born Roberto Concina in Fleurier, Switzerland, to Italian parents. He became proficient at playing the piano during his youth in Friuli, Italy, in the small town of Fagagna, where his family moved when he was young, and had been in the music scene since 1984. Concina worked as a DJ in some Italian clubs and private radio networks, and in 1990 he used his savings to establish his own recording studio and a pirate radio station. Originally performing under the name Roberto Milani, he adopted the anglicised name "Robert Miles" in anticipation of "the musical journey ahead of him", as well as international recognition.

== Music career ==
=== 1994–1997: Breakthrough and Dreamland ===
External videos
- "Robert Miles – 'Children' (Dream Version)" on YouTube

In 1994, Miles wrote a trance and chill-out piece based on acoustic guitar chords and soft synthesizer effects, "Children", which was later developed into a dream trance song featuring a piano theme on top. The composition was also created because Italy had been experiencing a series of deaths from car crashes due to the victims being high after attending rave parties; it was meant to calm rave attendants prior to their driving home to avoid crashes. The single picked up sales slowly; however, within two weeks of its official release in 1995, it had sold more than 350,000 copies all over Europe and topped the charts in many countries. The single received an unprecedented "Essential Tune of The Week" three weeks in a row on Pete Tong's show, causing a furious bidding war. It was then signed to Deconstruction Records in the UK by Giles Goodman of Dynamik Music (who represented Platipus Records the initial UK licensee). After occupying the Euro Top 100 chart number 1 spot for thirteen consecutive weeks by 1997, "Children" had sold more than five million copies worldwide. It earned Miles platinum records in many countries, a Brit Award for International Breakthrough Act 1997 (Miles was the only Italian artist to have received the award until its final award for that category in 2012), a World Music Award as World's Best Selling Male Newcomer, and various other awards.

Miles' next single was "Fable". Part of this song was used in the theatrical trailer for the U.S. movie Ever After starring Drew Barrymore and Dougray Scott. His debut album Dreamland was released on 7 June 1996 in Europe, and released in the United States about a month later. The album included a cover of "One and One" featuring British singer Maria Nayler. This cover became very popular (it reached number 1 in the Euro Top 100 Singles Chart during the Christmas period and remained in the top spot for six consecutive weeks) and was later released as a single in Europe and the U.S.

=== 1997–1998: 23am ===
In November 1997, Miles released another track, "Freedom", which was one of the key tracks on his second album 23am, featuring vocals provided by Kathy Sledge of Sister Sledge. Containing a different feel from the previously more club-oriented Dreamland, 23am incorporated more lyrics-driven songs than its predecessor while maintaining Miles' trademark piano sound from the first album.

=== 1998–2002: Departure from label and Organik ===
After splitting from Deconstruction, BMG and his former management in London, he set up his own independent record label Salt Records (stylised as S:alt Records, with S:alt being short for suitably:alternative) in 2001 and released his third album, Organik, featuring the new single "Paths" with vocals provided by Nina Miranda of Smoke City. Guests on the album included Trilok Gurtu, Bill Laswell and Nitin Sawhney. Music from Organik was used on various movie soundtracks such as The Bourne Identity, Derrida, and City of Ghosts. It was licensed to Narada Productions' Shakti Records label in the USA. In 2002, an album containing mainly remixes of songs found on Organik was released. The album, appropriately entitled Organik Remixes, contained remixes by the winners of the remixing contest held on Robert Miles's Web site, as well as remixes from well-known artists such as Future Sound of London, Riton, and Alexkid among others. The album also had one new track, "Bhairav", which featured the vocals of Amelia Cuni.

=== 2004–2005: Miles_Gurtu ===
In 2004, Miles released Miles_Gurtu, his fourth album, which was a collaboration with percussionist Trilok Gurtu and included jazz and electronica elements. Also guesting on the album were Nitin Sawhney, Jon Thorne, Mike Patto and Paul Falloon.

=== 2011–2012: Thirteen ===
Miles' fifth album, entitled Thirteen, was released worldwide on Salt Records in February 2011. For this album, Miles produced a blend of alternative and progressive rock with ambient and electronic soundscapes.

In 2012, Miles finished working on the soundtrack for the documentary film The Turn of THIS Century, directed by Peter Beyak and featuring the photography of Life Magazine. He founded a new FM and online alternative radio station, Open Lab, broadcasting from Ibiza, a project bringing together culture, arts, media, technology and innovation.

== Death ==
Miles died from metastatic cancer in Ibiza, Spain, on 9 May 2017, at the age of 47. A campaign was launched on Facebook to get 'Children' back on the charts in his honor.

His OpenLab station was taken off-air shortly afterwards, pending discussions on the future of the station. After receiving many messages from people expressing dismay at the station's suspension, it was announced that the station would return in 2019, starting with a live radio stream in January 2019 and followed by a reboot to radio on 106.4 FM in Ibiza in April 2019.

== Discography ==
Studio albums

- Dreamland (1996)
- 23am (1997)
- Organik (2001)
- Miles Gurtu (with Trilok Gurtu) (2004)
- Thirteen (2011)

== See also ==
- List of ambient music artists
- List of artists who reached number one on the US Dance chart
- List of number-one dance hits (United States)
