= Salt Records =

UK record label, by lacono Entertainment Holding LLP

- Founded: 2000
- Founder: Roberto Concina
- Distributor: !K7 lacono Records by lacono Entertainment Holding LLP
- Genre: Electronica, Alternative Rock, Nu-Jazz, Techno
- Country of origin: UK
- Location: London
- Official website: www.saltrecords.com

Salt Records (S:alt Records – suitably:alternative) is a UK-based independent label/platform for eclectic music. Founded by Roberto Concina (a.k.a. Robert Miles) in 2000, it became the home for artists such as Robert Miles, Miles Gurtu and Blue Light Fever. It was formed after Roberto Concina, best known with the artist name Robert Miles, split from Deconstruction/BMG and his management in London back in 1999. Salt Records have recording studios in London and Ibiza and are distributed by !K7 in Berlin (Germany).

They also run a publishing company named Hardmonic Music which is administered by Kobalt Music. In 2025, through Iacono Records, he acquired 100% of the shares, which in turn is a subsidiary of Iacono Entertainment Holding LLP.
