= Dream trance =

Subgenre of trance music

- Stylistic origins: Trance; house; progressive house; Eurodance
- Cultural origins: Early 1990s, Italy
- Typical instruments: Synthesizer; sequencer; piano; keyboard; sampler

Fusion genres
- Uplifting trance; psytrance

Dream trance is an early subgenre of trance music that peaked prominently on the international dance scene between 1995 and 1998 (colliding with the first time for trance to reach mainstream). The "dream" term has been known to largely influence house music in general, and therefore the subgenre is also known as dream house or dream dance on some occasions.

Today, dream trance is considered to be the first and the most primitive derivative of the progressive house movement that started around 1992. Many psytrance producers emergent at the time (notably Infected Mushroom) were also influenced by it.

== Definition ==
The key element of dream trance resides in catchy and deep melodies of such tracks, typically played on an acoustic instrument (piano, violin, saxophone, etc.) that are mastered and then sampled onto an electronic beat structure. The melodies are considered "dreamy", i.e. tending to alter the listener's mind, hence the name.

== Origins ==
The creation of dream trance was a response to social pressures in Italy during the early 1990s; the growth of rave culture among young adults, and the ensuing popularity of nightclub attendance, had created a weekly trend of deaths due to car accidents as clubbers drove across the country overnight, falling asleep at the wheel from strenuous dancing as well as alcohol and drug use. In mid-1996, deaths due to this phenomenon, called strage del sabato sera ("Saturday night slaughter") in Italy, were being estimated at 2,000 since the start of the 1990s. "Children" by Robert Miles is one of the pioneering tracks of the genre and was created due to these accidents. The decision by DJs like Miles to end their sets with slower, more calming music—intended to offset the high-energy, repetitive tracks played earlier—was met with approval from both authorities and the parents of car crash victims.

== Structure ==
Dream trance uses dance beats similar to those of the Eurodance and dance-pop genres rather than genuine trance beats mixed into 4-to-4 bass patterns with a particularly repetitive sound. The focus of the music is primarily on the melody rather than the beat, resulting in a trance-like melody and a house-like beat. The rhythm structure is also very simple, however, as stated before, all the importance is accented in instrumental strings that derive on various notes and shape the songs. Therefore, the style is very similar to trance in its general consistence, with the only difference being a constant, house-like progression.
