= Tycho discography =

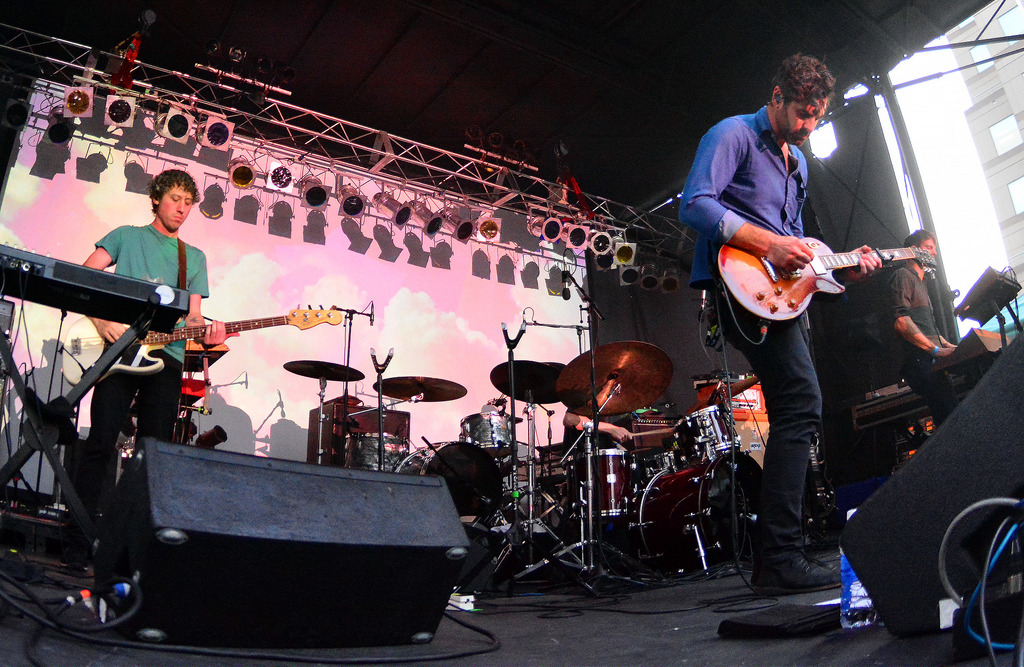
- Tycho performing at Hopscotch Music Festival in Raleigh, NC in 2015.
- Studio albums: 7
- EPs: 3
- Singles: 17
- Remix albums: 3
- Other charted songs: 2
- Remixes: 8

The following is a comprehensive discography of American ambient musician Tycho. His discography comprises six studio albums, one compilation album, two extended plays, and twelve singles.

== Albums ==
=== Studio albums ===
List of studio albums, with selected chart positions
Title	Album details	Peak chart positions				
Title	Album details	US	US Dance	BEL (FL)	BEL (WA)	UK
Past Is Prologue	Released: September 24, 2004 (Sunrise Projector) October 25, 2006 (Past is Prologue); Label: Gammaphone, Merck; Formats: CD, LP, digital download	—	—	—	—	—
Dive	Released: November 8, 2011; Label: Ghostly International; Formats: CD, LP, digital download	—	22	—	—	—
Awake	Released: March 18, 2014; Label: Ghostly International; Formats: CD, LP, digital download	23	2	104	143	159
Epoch	Released: September 30, 2016; Label: Ghostly International; Formats: CD, LP, digital download	78	1	170	—	—
Weather	Released: July 12, 2019; Label: Mom + Pop, Ninja Tune; Formats: CD, LP, digital download	132	3	—	—	—
Simulcast	Released: February 28, 2020; Label: Mom + Pop Music, Ninja Tune; Formats: CD, LP, digital download	—	6	—	—	—
Infinite Health	Released: August 30, 2024; Label: Mom + Pop Music, Ninja Tune; Formats: CD, LP, digital download	—	—	—	—	—
"—" denotes a recording that did not chart or was not released in that territory.

=== Remix albums ===
List of compilation albums, with selected chart positions
Title	Album details	Peak chart positions	
Title	Album details	US Dance	US Ind.
Awake Remixes	Released: January 15, 2016; Label: Ghostly International; Formats: LP, digital download	3	42
Weather Remixes	Released: December 18, 2020; Label: Mom+Pop/Ninjatune; Formats: LP, digital download	-	-

== Extended plays ==
List of extended plays
Title	EP details
The Science of Patterns	Released: 2002 (CD), 2007 (digital download), 2014 (Spotify); Label: None (self-released); Formats: CD, digital download
Fragments / Ascension (with Thievery Corporation)	Released: April 22, 2013; Label: Ghostly International; Formats: LP, digital download
Stress	Released: December 13, 2019; Label: Mom+Pop / Ninja Tune; Formats: Digital download

== Singles ==
Title	Year	Peak chart positions		Album	Certifications
Title	Year	US Dance	US Dance Dig.	Album	Certifications
"The Daydream / The Disconnect"	2007	—	—	Past Is Prologue	
"Adrift / From Home"	2008	—	—	Past Is Prologue / Dive	
"Coastal Brake"	2009	—	—	Dive	
"Hours"	2011	—	—	Dive	
"Dive"	2011	—	—	Dive	
"Awake"	2013	—	21	Awake	RIAA: Gold
"Montana"	2014	—	31	Awake	
"Spectre"	2014	—	—	Awake	
"See"	2014	—	—	Awake	
"Division"	2016	—	—	Epoch	
"Epoch"	2016	—	27	Epoch	
"See" (featuring Beacon)	2017	—	—	Non-album single	
"Jetty"	2018	—	—	Ninjawerks Volume 1	
"Easy"	2019	—	—	Weather	
"Pink & Blue"	2019	—	—	Weather	
"Outer Sunset"	2020	32	—	Simulcast	
"Time to Run"	2023				
"—" denotes a recording that did not chart or was not released in that territory.

== Other charted songs ==
Title	Year	Peak chart positions	Album
Title	Year	US Dance	Album
"Weather"	2019	43	Weather
"Japan" (featuring Saint Sinner)	2019	47	Weather

== Remixes ==
Title	Year	Original artist(s)	Album
"Little Man"	2011	Little Dragon	Non-album single
"I Take Comfort in Your Ignorance"	2013	Ulrich Schnauss	I Take Comfort In Your Ignorance Remix EP
"Fragments"	2013	Thievery Corporation	Fragments / Ascension
"Inside Out"	2014	Spoon	Inside Out Remixes
"The Ghosts of Beverly Drive"	2016	Death Cab for Cutie	Non-album single
"Across the Room (feat. Leon Bridges)"	2018	Odesza	Across the Room Remixes
"Live in the Moment (Tycho Sunrise Mix)"	2018	Portugal. The Man	Live in the Moment Remixes
"Live in the Moment (Tycho Sunset Mix)"	2018	Portugal. The Man	Live in the Moment Remixes
