= Esem =

Bulgarian electronic musician

- Also known as: Esem, Eesn
- Born: Georgi Hristov Marinov; 10 February 1979 (age 47)
- Origin: Varna, Bulgaria
- Genres: IDM, Ambient, Downtempo, Tracker-music
- Occupations: Music, Field Recording, Sound Design
- Instruments: Computer, Laptop, Synthesizer, Tracker, Sequencer
- Years active: 1997—present
- Labels: deFocus, Merck Records

Georgi Hristov Marinov (born 10 February 1979), known professionally as Esem, is a Bulgarian electronic music artist. Esem used to be known as the tracker musician StereoMan, a member of the music group New Objectives in Sound Exploration (NOISE).

== Musical career ==
Marinov got involved in composing electronic music and the demoscene in the late 1990s, through the work of Brothomstates and Lackluster among others. After a five-year netlabel membership in NOiSE ("New Objectives in Sound Exploration") Marinov was signed up to deFocus records for his first vinyl single – "Ikae", and debut album "Enveloped", thus becoming the first contemporary Bulgarian electronic music artist to have released a music record on vinyl.

After releasing his second album "Serial Human" commercially on Merck Records, Esem moved to London where he produced the material for "Scateren" – his third album. "Scateren" was released as a free Creative Commons-licensed download on Kahvi, and quickly became one of the label's most downloaded titles. In 2007 parts of "Scateren" were licensed and subsequently released by Nintendo as background music to the Nintendo DS game "Theta", and as downloadable ringtones (complementary to the game title). The original album remains available under Creative Commons.

Esem was a regular guest on the Lithuanian label Sutemos's "Intelligent Toys" series, featured alongside Vladislav Delay, Digitonal, Maps and Diagrams, Ulrich Schnauss, and others.

His music has been featured on Austrian national radio FM4 (ORF), and on the John Peel show on BBC Radio 1 in the United Kingdom. In 2006 Marinov edited a Sofia-based soundscape for the Radia network, later broadcast on a number of European radio stations. In July 2013 Marinov authored a one-hour-long programme for London community radio station Resonance FM – "Clearspot", featuring a documentary recording of the 2013–14 protests against the Oresharski cabinet in Bulgaria.

== Methods ==
Esem employs trackers and digital audio workstation software for his work. Most of his published music was produced using software synthesizers and Apple Inc.'s Logic Pro sequencer. Field recordings can be heard in his work unmodified and used as source material for signal processing. Since 2017, videos on his Instagram feed feature modular synthesizer instruments prominently.

Much of his work outside of music involves sound design and software development. He is the author of an Adium soundset, called "Minus Bells".

== Live performances ==
Marinov plays live only occasionally. Since 2000 he has played gigs in Europe including venues in the United Kingdom, Spain, Sweden, Russia, Bulgaria, and more recently in France, and the Netherlands, using Ableton Live, Teenage Engineering OP-1, and various MIDI controllers.

== Discography ==
- 2001 – EP – "Ikae" (12") deFocus. A lossless remaster was released in 2019.
- 2002 – Album – "Enveloped" (CD, LP) on deFocus. A remastered version was released in 2017.
- 2003 – Album – "Serial Human" (CD) on Merck Records,
- 2005 – Album – "Scateren" (Ogg digital download) on Kahvi Records. A lossless remaster was released independently in 2016.
- 2013 – EP – "Aquanaut" (digital download) released independently on Bandcamp.
- 2017 – EP – "| |" (digital download) released on Bandcamp.
- 2020 – EP – "Chaos Crop" (digital download) released on Bandcamp.

== Name ==
Esem is a distorted abbreviation of S, M – the capital letters of his past demoscene alias – StereoMan.
