= Past Is Prologue =

Past Is Prologue may refer to:

- "What's past is prologue", a quotation from the 1611 play The Tempest by William Shakespeare
- "Past Is Prologue" (Defiance), a 2013 episode of the American science fiction series Defiance
- Past Is Prologue (album), a 2004 album by American ambient music project Tycho
- "Past is Prologue", a 2021 episode from season 5 of the American television series 9-1-1
- "Past is Prologue", the first episode of the 2021 American television series 4400

== See also ==
- What's Past Is Prologue (disambiguation)
