= Weather (Tycho album) =

Studio album by Tycho
- Released: July 12, 2019
- Genres: Downtempo; electronic; ambient; pop
- Length: 29:16
- Labels: Mom + Pop; Ninja Tune
- Producer: Scott Hansen

Tycho chronology
| Epoch (2016) | Weather (2019) | Simulcast (2020) |

Professional ratings
Aggregate scores
| Source | Rating |
|---|---|
| Metacritic | 76/100 |
Review scores
| Source | Rating |
| AllMusic | 3.5/5 stars |
| Exclaim! | 9/10 |
| MusicOMH | 3.5/5 stars |
| Paste | 7/10 |

Weather is the fifth studio album by ambient music project Tycho, released on July 12, 2019. The album was preceded by the release of the singles "Easy" and "Pink & Blue", the latter of which was released along with the album announcement on May 14, 2019.

Being the first Tycho album to feature a vocalist, Weather was nominated for a Grammy Award at the 62nd Annual Grammy Awards in the Best Dance/Electronic Album category, losing out to The Chemical Brothers' album No Geography.

A Remix album was released on December 18, 2020.

== Background ==
Magnetic Magazine characterized the album's sound as different from the trilogy of Dive, Awake and Epoch in that while "the airy guitars, synths and percussion are still largely there", they have been "adapted for a bit more of an organic, indie rock template", with vocals from Saint Sinner on five of the album's eight tracks. Hansen described the album as a collaboration with Saint Sinner, saying that he "wanted to finally fulfill what had been a vision of mine since the beginning: to incorporate the most organic instrument of all, the human voice".

== Track listing ==
| No. | Title | Length |
|---|---|---|
| 1. | "Easy" | 3:27 |
| 2. | "Pink & Blue" (featuring Saint Sinner) | 4:19 |
| 3. | "Japan" (featuring Saint Sinner) | 3:18 |
| 4. | "Into the Woods" | 4:02 |
| 5. | "Skate" (featuring Saint Sinner) | 3:07 |
| 6. | "For How Long" (featuring Saint Sinner) | 3:00 |
| 7. | "No Stress" (featuring Saint Sinner) | 3:49 |
| 8. | "Weather" | 4:14 |
| Total length: | | 29:16 |

== Charts ==
| Chart (2019) | Peak position |
|---|---|
| UK Independent Albums (Official Charts) | 17 |
| US Billboard 200 | 132 |
| US Top Dance Albums (Billboard) | 3 |
