= Lackluster =

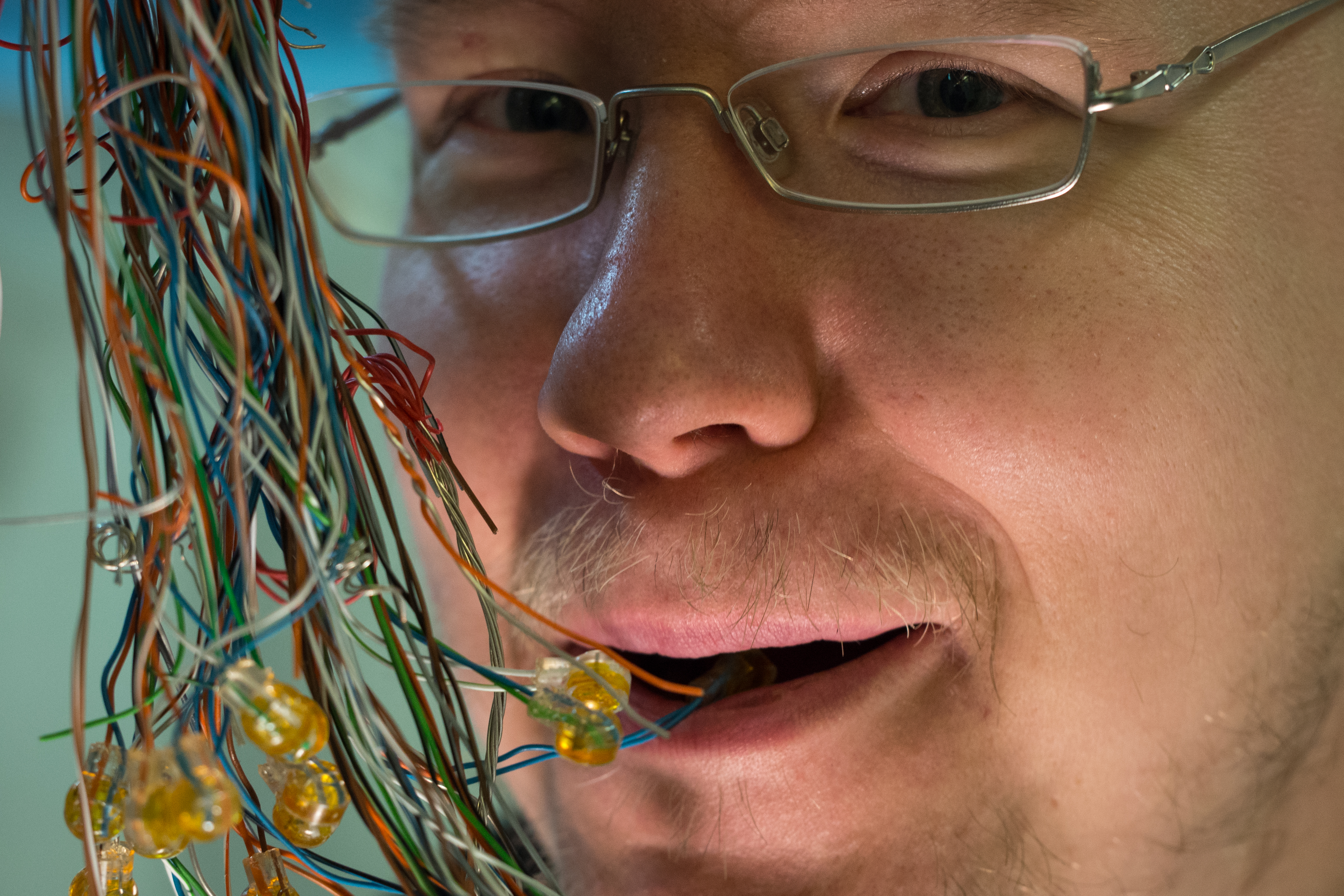

Background information
- Also known as: Lackluster, Esa Ruoho, HLER
- Born: Esa Juhani Ruoho; 26 October 1978 (age 47)
- Origin: Helsinki, Finland
- Genres: IDM, ambient, downtempo, tracker-music, chiptune, chillout
- Occupation: Musician
- Instruments: Computer, laptop, synthesizer, tracker, sequencer
- Years active: 1994–present
- Labels: deFocus, Merck Records, U-Cover Records, SLSK Records, Psychonavigation Records
- Website: www.lackluster.org

Esa Ruoho (born 26 October 1978 in Helsinki, Finland), better known as Lackluster, is a Finnish electronic music producer and performer from Kontula, Helsinki. He is also known as Esa Ruoho, XLLV, Can'O'Lard and Kökö and the Köks.

Ruoho has lived most of his life in Helsinki, Finland, but has also, since 2000, travelled to Regina, Saskatchewan, Canada for six months in 2000–2001, and also spent time in Dublin, Ireland.

== Musical career ==
Esa Ruoho started composing electronic music in the mid-1990s and, after 2000 has been releasing recorded music (remixes, compilation-tracks, original work) on many labels, full-length CDs on such labels as deFocus records (Great Britain), Merck Records (Miami, Florida, US), U-cover (Belgium), Psychonavigation Records (Dublin, Ireland), New-Speak Records (Stockholm, Sweden). He has since 2007 worked with SLSK Records from San Francisco and Nice And Nasty from Ireland, the San Francisco-based netlabel TwoCircles Records and the Argentinian netlabel Igloo-Rec, and the American label JellyFish Frequency Recordings.

Lackluster was formerly known as the chiptune musician, Distance, part of the demoscene groups Orange, Monotonik, Calodox, The Digital Artists, The Planet of Leather Moomins (TPOLM), FLO and Satori.

Esa also ran a Bulletin Board System, Cloudcity, from 1992 to 2000 – utilizing HectoBBS (1992), SuperBBS (1992–1994) and PCBoard (1994–2000) BBS Software. The name Lackluster is taken from "Pyramids" by Terry Pratchett (Discworld series), encountered 1996–1997.

=== Collaborations ===
Esa has collaborated with Heikki Lindgren since 2018, forming a duo called HLER (Heikki Lindgren, Esa Ruoho), creating fully improvised Ambient Drone music using a rare Peruvian monophonic synthesizer, the Atomosynth Mochika XL.

=== Live performances ===
Since 2000, Ruoho has played numerous musical performances as Lackluster, Esa Ruoho and as a part of the ambient-drone duo HLER in Finland, Sweden, Norway, Netherlands, Belgium, Italy, Germany, France, Spain, Ireland, England, Austria, Poland, Russia, Latvia, Estonia, Bulgaria, Hungary, Lithuania and Ukraine. Ruoho has also played as warm-up support for numerous electronic musicians, such as Biosphere, Petri Kuljuntausta, The Orb, Mixmaster Morris, Brothomstates, Aleksi Perälä/Astrobotnia/Ovuca, Cylob, Wevie Stonder, Machinedrum, Jimmy Edgar, Move D, Jimi Tenor and Bad Loop.

== Discography ==
- 1999 – Album – "CDR#2" (CDr) Monotonik
- 2000 – EP – "FOC349" (LP) deFocus
- 2000 – Album – "Container" (CD, LP) deFocus
- 2000 – EP – "R U Oho?" (LP) deFocus
- 2000 – EP – "Rikos005" (LP) Rikos Records
- 2001 – Album – "Spaces" (CD) U-Cover (as Esa Ruoho)
- 2001 – EP – "Spaces" (LP) Inc.US (as Esa Ruoho)
- 2001 – EP – "Zealectronic Purple" (LP) Zeal
- 2001 – EP – "One-Offs" (NET) Monotonik
- 2002 – EP – "A Lackluster Sampler" (LP) Merck
- 2002 – EP – "Wrapping Album Sampler" (LP) deFocus
- 2002 – Album – "Wrapping" (CD, LP) deFocus
- 2003 – Album – "Showcase" (CD) Merck
- 2003 – EP – "None of That" (NET) Binkcrsh (as Can'O'Lard)
- 2003 – LP – "None of What" (NET) Corewatch (as Can'O'Lard)
- 2003 – EP – "Not An EP" (NET) Corewatch
- 2003 – EP – "You Are on My Mind" (NET) Monotonik
- 2004 – EP – "Showcase Sampler" (LP) Merck
- 2004 – Album – "Remixselection_one" (CD) Psychonavigation
- 2004 – EP – "R U Oho?" (LP) Merck
- 2005 – Album – "Slice" (CD) U-Cover
- 2005 – Album – "What You Want Isn't What You Need" (CD) Newspeak Records
- 2006 – EP – "Lax EP" (NET) Digilog
- 2007 – EP – "Repulsine EP" (CD) SLSK Records
- 2007 – EP – "The Stationary Trout" (NET) Part2 Records
- 2008 – Album – "Places" (CDr) Grundruck Records (as Esa Ruoho)
- 2009 – EP – "Aeration" (NET) TwoCircles Records
- 2009 – EP – "Cold Trail" (NET) Acroplane Recordings
- 2009 – EP – "Proof of Concept" (NET) Yuki Yaki Recordings
- 2009 – EP – "The Flows" (NET) Part2 Records
- 2009 – EP – "Portal" (NET) Cornwarning
- 2009 – EP – "Scattered Harvest" (NET) Format-Noise
- 2011 – EP – "Remixed" (DIGITAL) Nice & Nasty Records
- 2011 – EP – "Detro" (DIGITAL) Nice & Nasty Records
- 2011 – EP – "Kaneel/Lackluster Split 3"" (CDr) Awkward Silence recordings
- 2011 – Album – "The Invisible Spanish Inquisition" (CD) Igloo Pop Records
- 2011 – EP – "Riversmouth" (3" CD-r) Attenuation Circuit
- 2012 – Album – "On The Hangar of Spaceship Earth" (NET) Mahorka Net-Label (as Esa Ruoho)
- 2014 – Album – "Moments" (DIGITAL) Igloo Pop Records
- 2014 – Album – "Lexicon of Goods" (DIGITAL) JellyFish Frequency Recordings
- 2015 – Album – "Merck Package" (DIGITAL) Lackluster Bandcamp
- 2015 – EP – "Parched Throat" (CD-r/DIGITAL) Attenuation Circuit (as Esa Ruoho)
- 2015 – EP – "Swansong" (NET) Kahvi Collective
- 2015 – Album – "deFocus Package" (NET) Lackluster Bandcamp
- 2015 – Album – "PSCHNVGTN K T H X" (NET) Lackluster Bandcamp
- 2016 – Album – "Moonbears on Planet Earth Soundtrack" (NET) Lackluster Bandcamp
- 2016 – Album – Esa Ruoho: KVA-015 (Cassette) Kaukana Väijyy Ambient (as Esa Ruoho)
- 2018 – Album – HLER (Cassette) HLER Bandcamp (Heikki Lindgren & Esa Ruoho = HLER)
- 2018 – EP – Yep, I'd Certainly take a Roland D2 for free (NET) Lackluster Bandcamp
- 2018 – Album – "Hydroton - a model of Cold Fusion: Original Soundtrack" (NET) Lackluster Bandcamp
- 2018 – Album – Collage (NET) Lackluster Bandcamp (as Esa Ruoho)
- 2019 – Album – Avaruusromua Special 2016 (NET) Lackluster Bandcamp (as Esa Ruoho)
- 2021 - EP - 100606 Kosmos8 Sinuus Sina

=== Media collaborations ===
- Utopias of Helsinki, a web report for Helsingin Sanomat "What would Helsinki be like now, if all of the grandiose city-utopias of the 1960s had come to fruition?" (composition)(2001)
- Pauli Ojala (a Finnish graphics artist) on "13/10/99", a short music video which was presented at the Assembly 2001 Wild demo competition, placing 4th.
- Wilma Mehtonen (a Finnish choreographer) "Ulottumaton Symbioosi" (2002).
- Halcyon (demogroup) DVD, providing in-menu composition (2002)
- Wilma Mehtonen "T.43" modern dance-performance (2003).
- Teemu Niskanen (a Finnish photographer) on a web-slideshow project (2006).
- Thuyen Nguyen: "The Most Powerful Person in the World" – 16 May 2007.
  - Synopsis: A love letter to video games.
- Luca Barbeni (designer) on "dune.8081", a flash website, 2007.
- Mari Helisevä (painter) on "Luontaisenkaltaisia", an art installation featuring a musical mixture of kitchen-recorded materials, displayed at Maa-Tila, Helsinki, Finland, from 9 to 20 January 2008.
- Thuyen Nguyen: "Same as it ever was" – 29 February 2008.
  - Synopsis: Video game critics use the same arguments against gaming as they did for movies, television, comics, books.
- Jonatan Söderström: Retro 4, 2008
- scheltema/van beem NEPCO/ILC: "Headfooters", 2008
  - Synopsis: Cutesy headfoot monsters jump around to the sound of "Hugytrak" off of Lackluster: Slice (released on U-Cover)
- Antti Mutta/Pelaaja-Lehti (Journalist) on "Korg DS-10", a review, Pelaaja-Lehti September/2009 (2009)
- Toisissa Tiloissa: "Suuri Koralliriutta" – 21 April 2018, 29 September 2018.
  - Synopsis: An improvised dance performance open to the public organised by Toisissa Tiloissa and Kontula Electronic, held at the Youth House of Kontula - re-run at Kanneltalo.
