= Easy Pieces (disambiguation) =

Easy Pieces is a 1985 album by Lloyd Cole

Variants of Easy Pieces include:

== Film and TV ==
- Five Easy Pieces, 1970 American drama
- Five Easy Pieces (1980 TV series) (輪流傳), Chinese TV series
- Seven Easy Pieces, DVD series of performances given by artist Marina Abramović in New York

== Books ==
- The Feynman Lectures on Physics (redirect from Six Easy Pieces)
- Three Easy Pieces, Wright Morris
- Five Easy Pieces, Geoffrey Hartman
- Six Easy Pieces, novel by Walter Mosley

== Music ==
=== Classical ===
- Three Easy Pieces (Stravinsky) for piano, 4 hands 1914
- Five Easy Pieces (Stravinsky) 4 hands 1917
- Ten Easy Pieces (Bartók) for piano, 1908
- Easy Pieces (3 pieces) 1933 John Cage
- Easy Pieces (4 pieces), Op.1b Howard Blake
- Two Easy Pieces (1951) Alan Bush
- 17 Easy Pieces, Op. 34 Mieczysław Weinberg
- Children's Album: 24 Easy Pieces, for piano, Op. 39 Tchaikovsky 1878

=== Albums ===
- Easy Pieces, album by Lloyd Cole and the Commotions 1985
- Five Easy Pieces, Lateduster album 2002
- Easy Pieces, Lateduster album 2004
- Three Easy Pieces (Buffalo Tom album)
- Ten Easy Pieces, album by American singer-songwriter Jimmy Webb, 1996
- 5 Easy Pieces (Scott Walker box set), anthology of Scott Walker 2003
- Seven Easy Pieces (EP), The Detroit Cobras 2004
