= John Imah =

Nigerian American entrepreneur

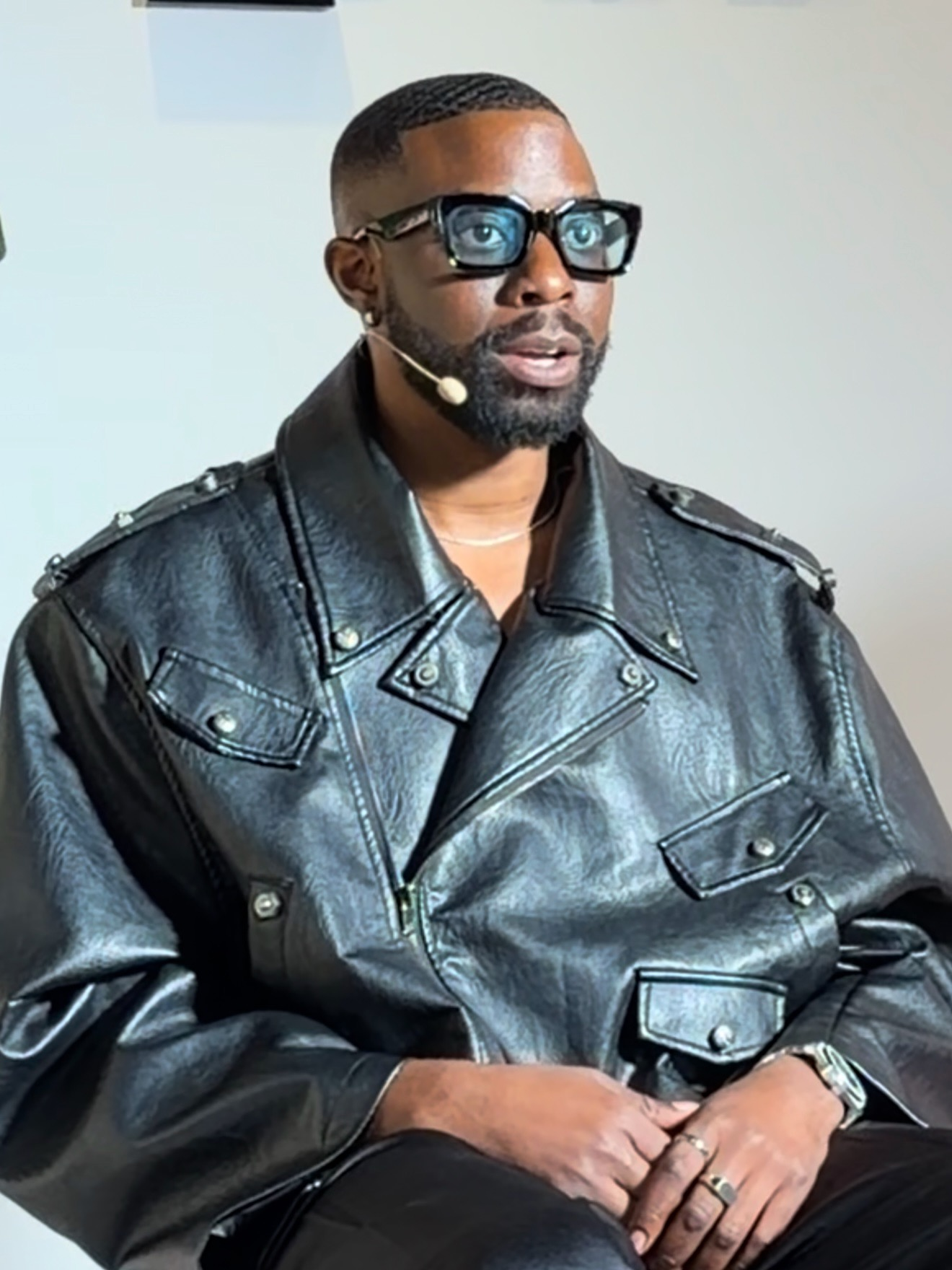
- Born: John Imah; Dallas, Texas, U.S.
- Alma mater: University of Texas at Arlington
- Occupation: Entrepreneur
- Organization: SpreeAI
- Title: Co-founder and CEO
- Website: johnimah.com

John Imah is a Nigerian American entrepreneur and technology executive. He is the co-founder and chief executive officer of SPREEAI, a fashion technology company. In 2025, reports indicated that SPREEAI had reached a valuation of about $1.5 billion. His estimated net worth is $400 million.

== Early life and education ==
Imah was born to Nigerian parents and grew up in the Dallas, United States. At age 7, he disassembled and reassembled his family’s computer, an incident noted as an early sign of his interest in electronics. By his early teens, he had taught himself computer programming and founded two startup companies. He launched his first technology business at age 15 and sold it, followed by a second venture in mobile gaming at age 16. Imah attended the University of Texas at Arlington, where he earned a bachelor’s degree in business administration with a concentration in management information systems.

== Career ==
While enrolled at the University, Imah was recruited by Samsung Electronics to join the team developing Galaxy mobile devices. After leaving Samsung, Imah held partnership and business development roles at several technology companies, including Take-Two Interactive, Twitch, Facebook (later Meta Platforms), and Snap Inc. At Twitch, he worked in senior partnerships management, focusing on collaborations between gaming and brands. At Meta, he led the Gaming Creator program and co-announced the Level Up program in 2018. Imah later joined Snap Inc. as Head of Partnerships, where he oversaw initiatives to integrate gaming features into the Snapchat platform.

=== SPREEAI ===
In 2023, Imah co-founded SPREEAI, a company focused on artificial intelligence applications in fashion retail. In an interview with Rolling Stone UK, Imah explained that he launched SPREEAI to combine his technology background with his passion for fashion. By 2025, the company had reached a valuation of $1.5 billion. The company’s board includes Naomi Campbell, Bob Davidson and Larry Ruvo.. SPREEAI has had research collaborations and talent initiatives involving the Massachusetts Institute of Technology (MIT) and Carnegie Mellon University. The company has also partnered with the Council of Fashion Designers of America (CFDA), Sergio Hudson, and Kai Collective.

== Recognition ==
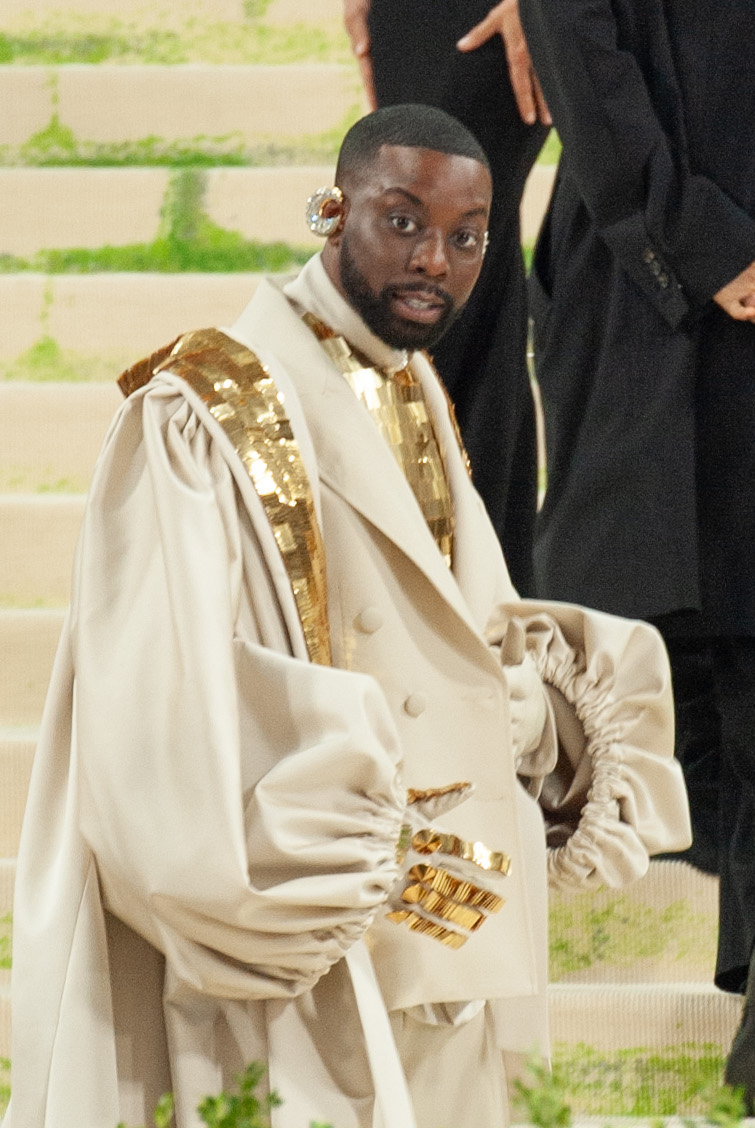
Imah at the 2026 Met Gala in custom Charles Harbison

Imah is a member of Council of Fashion Designers of America. In 2025, Imah was named to the Observer’s AI Power Index, recognizing 100 of the most influential leaders in artificial intelligence. He was also included in AfroTech’s Future 50, highlighting Black innovators shaping the future of technology. Inc. featured Imah in its list of 40 business leaders who propelled their organizations to success and the American Reporter recognized him among the "Top 15 Entrepreneurs Empowering Others to Dream Bigger and Achieve More." The same year, Imah appeared on the cover of L'Officiel Arabia.

== Personal life ==
Imah is single and, as to 2026, he resides in Los Angeles, California.
