= Melanine =

Melanine may refer to:

- "Melanine", a song from the album Dive by Tycho.
- Melanin, a natural pigment (spelled as melanine in French and Dutch)

== See also ==
- Melamine, an organic compound
  - Melamine resin, a plastic material made from melamine and formaldehyde
