= What's Past Is Prologue (disambiguation) =

"What's past is prologue" is a quotation from the 1611 play The Tempest by William Shakespeare.

What's Past Is Prologue may also refer to:

- "What's Past Is Prologue" (The Flash), a 2018 episode
- "What's Past Is Prologue", a 2005 episode of the TV series Summerland
- "What's Past Is Prologue" (Star Trek: Discovery), a 2018 episode
- "What's Past Is Prologue", a 2019 episode of the Indian web series Bard of Blood

== See also ==
- Past Is Prologue (disambiguation)
