= Charles Elliott Harbison =

American fashion designer

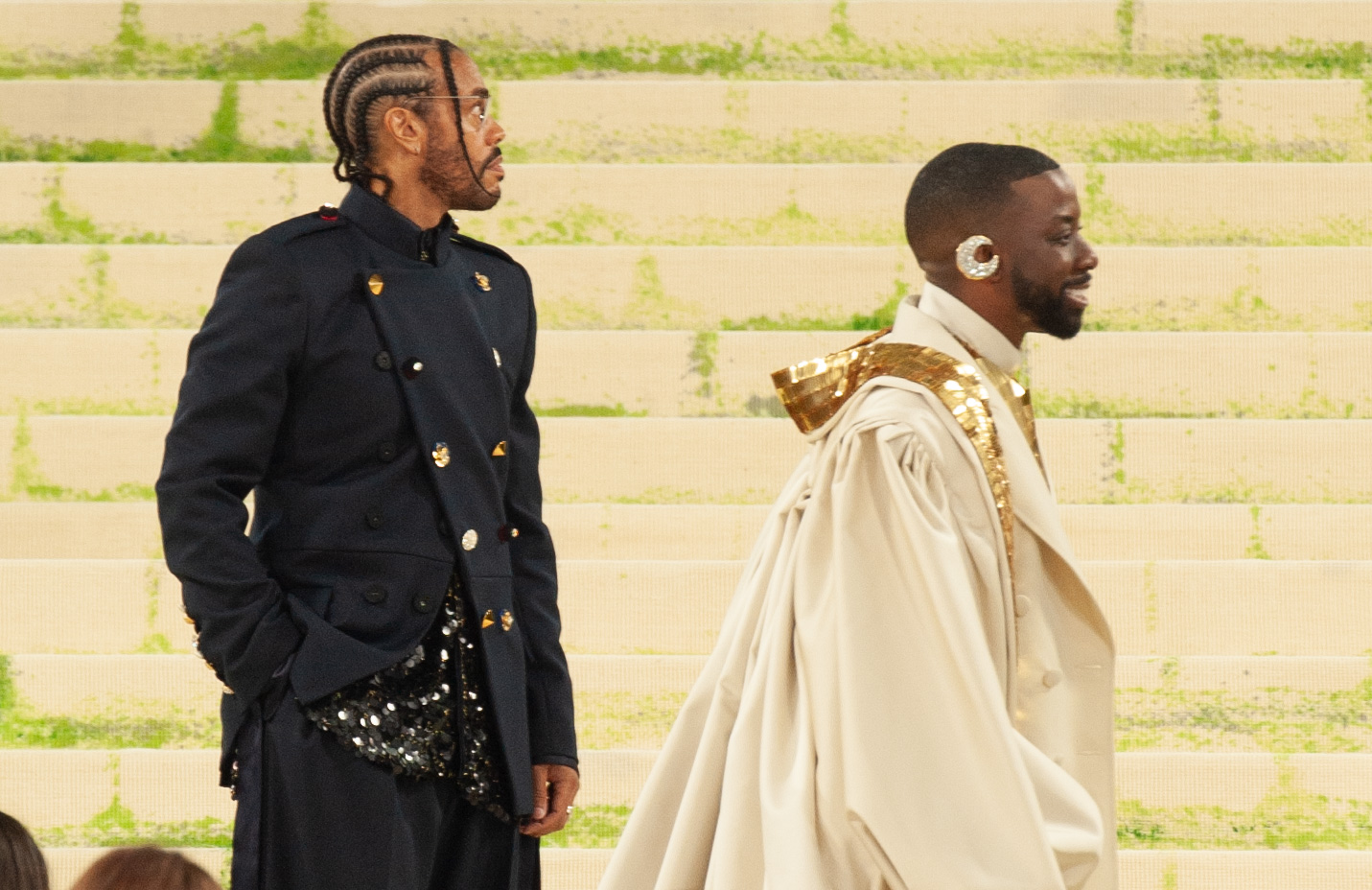
Harbison (left) with John Imah, wearing his design, at the 2026 Met Gala

Charles Harbison is an American fashion designer. He is the founder and creative director of the luxury brand Harbison Studio.
