= Adam Johnson (musician) =

American musician, designer, and artist (born 1976)

- Born: 1976 (age 49–50); Minneapolis, Minnesota, United States
- Genres: Electronic; IDM; ambient
- Occupations: Musician; DJ; sound designer; visual artist; photographer; documentary filmmaker; video editor
- Instruments: synthesizers; production software
- Years active: c. 2003–present
- Label: Merck Records

Adam Johnson (born 1976) is an American electronic musician from Minneapolis, Minnesota, known for his 2003 album, Chigliak, on the Miami based electronic music label, Merck Records. He has released music on American and European electronic music record labels, and licensed his music for use in advertising, TV and films. His music has also been licensed by world renown DJs and record producers such as Sasha, John Digweed, and Way Out West. In 2014, Fact magazine included the track "Anex" from the album, Chigliak, on a list of "The 100 Greatest IDM Tracks."

Johnson is also a Photographer, Documentary Filmmaker and Video Editor. He holds a BFA in Photography from the Pacific Northwest College of Art in Portland, Oregon (2013).
