= Kahvi =

Kahvi Collective
- Founded: 1998
- Founder: Vae
- Genre: Ambient; IDM; Netlabel; Demoscene
- Country of origin: Finland
- Location: Helsinki, Finland
- Official website: http://www.kahvi.org/

Kahvi (Finnish for "coffee") is a netlabel founded in 1998 and currently operated by 4T Thieves. Based in Helsinki, Finland, it aims to release music in the Ogg Vorbis, MP3, WAV and video formats to anyone online on various distribution sites such as Bandcamp, Mixcloud, Scene.org and the Kahvi website. The label has always had a strong connection with the demoscene, and is one among several well-known netlabels, such as Monotonik.

There are over 400 releases from 100+ artists, that are hand picked and released either once or twice a month. All releases have cover artwork, mp3 and ogg download versions and a podcast also broadcasts the release as a single mix.

== Roster ==
- 4T Thieves
- Aleksi Eeben
- Alpha Conspiracy, The
- Bad Loop
- Blamstrain
- Cheju
- Diskreet
- Dreamlin
- Esem
- Kenny Beltrey
- KiloWatts
- Kunds (Artist Lionel Cantegreil)
- Lackluster
- Meso
- Mosaik (formerly known as Radix)
- PinZa
- Planet Boelex
- Realsmokers
- Sense
- Sushi Brother
- Xerxes
- Xhale
- Zainetica

Several guest artists have also been featured over the years as part of special Christmas releases.

- Mark Franklin
- Cell
- Solar Fields
- Richard Devine

While the main focus is freely available music, Kahvi has also released some commercial Digital Download releases. These releases are available on Beatport, iTunes and other similar digital download outlets.
