= Styled to Rock (American TV series) =

- Genre: Reality competition
- Based on: Styled to Rock
- Starring: Rihanna; Pharrell Williams; Erin Wasson; Mel Ottenberg
- Country of origin: United States
- Original language: English
- No. of seasons: 1
- No. of episodes: 10

Production
- Executive producers: James Lassiter; Robyn Rihanna Fenty
- Running time: 42 minutes
- Production companies: Marcy Media Films; Overbrook Entertainment; Shed Media

Original release
- Network: Bravo
- Release: October 25 – December 27, 2013

Styled to Rock is an American reality competition television series based on the British television series of the same name, executive produced by recording artist Rihanna which focuses on fashion design. The contestants would compete with each other to create the best outfit for one or more famous music acts every week, restricted by time and materials. Their designs were judged and the music act of the week would choose their favourite one, and one designer was eliminated each week.

The series was originally scheduled to debut on November 5, 2013, on the now defunct Style Network. However two weeks before its September 23, 2013 debut, the Esquire Network was announced as taking over Style's channel space, rather than G4 as originally planned. It was announced on September 30, 2013, that the series would premiere October 25, 2013, on Bravo.

The show was cancelled after just one season due to low viewership and Rihanna's busy schedule.

== Format ==
Similar to Project Runway, the series was also looking for new designers to create fashion for A-list celebrities in the world. Supported by their mentors, the candidates who were chosen as well as the mentors all by Rihanna personally, would fight in a weekly battle for the final. Weekly, the candidates would design outfits for one or more music celebrities. Normally the celebrities select the winners outfit by themselves. Every week produced a winner and two bottom contestants who would have to assert themselves verbally, until finally the worst of the week was eliminated. In the final, the two best designers would fight to win a $100,000 cash prize, a fashion feature in Glamour magazine and the chance to become the next member of Rihanna's design team.

On May 15, 2013, it was announced that American singer and fashion designer Pharrell Williams would serve as one of the mentors on the series. Five days later on May 20, 2013, it was revealed that American model Erin Wasson joined the series as another mentor. Rihanna's stylist Mel Ottenberg was announced as the third and final mentor on May 29, 2013.

== Contestants ==
Name	Age^{1}	Hometown	Place of Residence	Results
Keenan Zeno	27	New Orleans, Louisiana	Atlanta, Georgia	14th
Adriana Diaz	22	Fontana, California	Riverside, California	13th
Jordan Crowson	32	Conway, Arkansas	Conway, Arkansas	12th
Ebony White	36	Hot Springs, Arkansas	New York, New York	11th
Kristie Metcalf	33	Salt Lake City, Utah	Seattle, Washington	10th
Laura Thapthimkuna	28	Panton, Vermont	Chicago, Illinois	9th
Cecilia Aragon	30	San Francisco, California	San Francisco, California	8th
Andre Soriano	42	San Diego, California	Occoquan, VA	7th
Adam Christoffel †	30	Minneapolis, Minnesota	Brooklyn, New York	6th
Dexter Simmons	29	Oakland, California	Oakland, California	5th
Ahni Radvanyi	27	Xenia, Ohio	Venice, Los Angeles	4th
Autumn Kietponglert	33	Ocean City, New Jersey	Philadelphia, Pennsylvania	3rd
Laura Petrielli-Pulice	35	Park Ridge, Illinois	Chicago, Illinois	2nd
Sergio Hudson	29	Ridgeway, South Carolina	Ridgeway, South Carolina	1st

^Note 1: Age at the time of filming. ^Note 12: Adam died in December 13, 2023. ( Obituary : https://www.legacy.com/us/obituaries/name/adam-christoffel-obituary?id=53867698#guestbook )

== Challenges ==
Elimination Chart
Designer	Age	1	2	3	4	5	6	7	8	9	10
Sergio	29			WIN	WIN	SAFE	SAFE	BTM3	WIN	WIN	WINNER
Laura P.	35	HIGH	HIGH	SAFE	HIGH	SAFE	SAFE	HIGH	BTM4	HIGH	RUNNER-UP
Autumn	33	HIGH	WIN	SAFE	SAFE	BTM3	WIN	WIN	BTM4	BTM2	ELIM
Ahni	27	WIN	SAFE	HIGH	SAFE	BTM3	HIGH	HIGH	BTM4	ELIM	
Dexter	29	SAFE	SAFE	SAFE	BTM2	WIN	HIGH	BTM3	ELIM		
Adam	30	SAFE	SAFE	BTM2	SAFE	SAFE	WIN	ELIM			
Andre	42	SAFE	SAFE	SAFE	SAFE	HIGH	ELIM				
Cecilia	30	SAFE	SAFE	SAFE	SAFE	SAFE	ELIM				
Laura T.	28			SAFE	SAFE	ELIM					
Kristie	33	SAFE	BTM2	SAFE	ELIM						
Ebony	36	SAFE	SAFE	ELIM							
Jordan	32	SAFE	ELIM								
Adriana	22	BTM2	ELIM								
Keenan	27	ELIM									

Gold background and WINNER means the designer won Styled to Rock.
Silver background and RUNNER-UP means the designer was the runner-up on Styled to Rock.
Blue background and WIN means the designer won that challenge.
Turquoise background and HIGH means the designer was in the top looks for that challenge.
Tan background and SAFE means the designer was safe from elimination, but wasn't one of the top looks.
Orange background and BTM2 means the designer was in the bottom two (or more), but was not eliminated.
Red background and ELIM means the designer lost and was eliminated of the competition.

== Episodes ==
No.	Title	Original release date	US viewers (millions)
1	"Rock It for Rihanna"	October 25, 2013	0.47
2	"Kylie Minogue's Look of the Future"	November 1, 2013	0.24
3	"Kelly Osbourne Rocks the Red Carpet"	November 8, 2013	0.39
4	"Miley's Sexy Night Out"	November 15, 2013	0.43
5	"Carly Rae's Off-Duty Glamour"	November 22, 2013	0.32
6	"Lighting Up Nervo"	November 27, 2013	0.46
7	"Rocking the Stage For the Band Perry"	December 6, 2013	0.33
8	"Hollywood Glam For Khloe"	December 13, 2013	0.28
9	"Big Sean & Naya Rivera in the Spotlight"	December 20, 2013	0.28
10	"Rihanna on the Runway"	December 27, 2013	0.40
