= Arctic Hospital =

American DJ

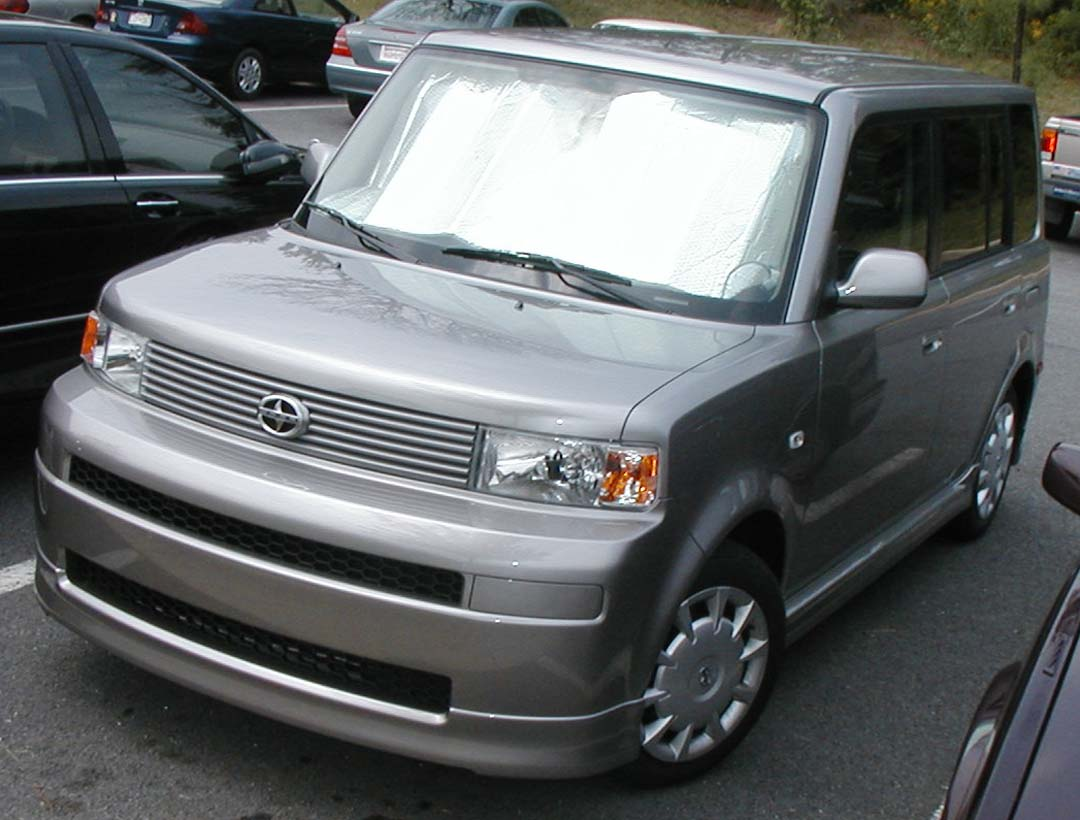
Bray's urban techno stylings landed him on the demo CD included with every Scion xB sold in North America.

Arctic Hospital (Eric Patrick Bray born in Green Bay, Wisconsin, January 8, 1985) is an American DJ and record producer. He began DJing industrial and EBM at age 14, and began producing urban techno on a Macintosh using the software sequencer Logic when he was 17. He was a pioneer of Belgian Jumpstyle, introducing the dance to North American partygoers at the WI Sandstorm raves of the early 2000s. In 2004, Eric Bray was signed to Narita Records after owner Gabe Koch saw him open for seminal techno DJ John Digweed. The music of Arctic Hospital is often described as dub techno.

== Side projects ==
Eric Bray performs in the band Semble, playing laptop alongside Steve James (vocals, guitar, piano, mbira, glockenspiel, drums), Beth Perry (vocals, flute, cello, marimba, synth, piano, guitar) and Matt Kelly (guitar, violin, percussion, zither, accordion, saw, mbira, laptop/sampler).

Eric Bray also performs in the ambient music group, The World on Higher Downs. He also releases IDM under the alias Talve.

== Discography as Arctic Hospital ==
=== Albums ===
- Citystream (Narita, 2006)
- Neon Veils (Lantern, 2008)
- In Chaos (Lantern, 2010)
- Going Sun (Lantern, 2012)

=== Singles ===
- Infirm and Attentive (Narita, 2004)
- Metropolis Love (Narita, 2005)
