= Sergio Hudson =

American fashion designer

- Born: Ridgeway, South Carolina, U.S.
- Education: Bauder College
- Label: Sergio Hudson
- Website: sergiohudson.com

Sergio Hudson is an American fashion designer and the founder of the eponymous womenswear label Sergio Hudson. He is best known for dressing Michelle Obama and Vice President Kamala Harris at the 2021 inauguration of Joe Biden.

Born and raised in Ridgeway, South Carolina, Hudson studied fashion at Bauder College in Atlanta. In 2013, he won the Bravo fashion competition Styled to Rock, and he launched his label the following year. He made his New York Fashion Week debut in 2020 and presented his tenth-anniversary collection at the New York Public Library Main Branch in February 2026. From November 2023 to July 2024, the Columbia Museum of Art exhibited his garments and sketches in "Sergio Hudson: Focused on the Fit".

== Early life and education ==
Hudson was born in the mid-1980s and raised in Ridgeway, South Carolina. His mother, Sheldon Hudson, introduced him to sewing and fashion design when he was four years old, and he has credited her as his muse. He studied fashion at Bauder College in Atlanta, where one of his mentors was Cassandra Harrison, a longtime collaborator of designer Bob Mackie. After graduating in 2003, he started his own business on Sumter Street in downtown Columbia, South Carolina.

== Career ==
=== Early career ===
After fashion school, Hudson spent several years making custom looks for clients in Columbia, at $300 to $500 each. In 2013, he won Styled to Rock, a fashion competition on Bravo, and its $100,000 prize; he launched his eponymous label the following year. One of his first celebrity clients was Kylie Jenner. He moved to Los Angeles in 2016, where designer Kevan Hall mentored him and stylists Zerina Akers and Law Roach helped him build his clientele.

=== New York Fashion Week ===
The designer made his New York Fashion Week debut in September 2020. His Fall 2021 show, held in September 2021, opened with a performance by singer Sheila E. For his Spring/Summer 2022 collection, he collaborated with a number of veteran models, including Beverly Johnson and Veronica Webb. That show, a safari-themed, see-now-buy-now presentation, took its colors from the traditional dress of South Africa's Ndebele people. In September 2022, he presented Collection 10 at The Léman Ballroom, with Webb, Chanel Iman, and Maria Borges among the models; Serena Williams had just worn one of his slip dresses on the cover of Vogue's September 2022 issue, and Issa Rae wore a dress from the collection to the 2022 Emmy Awards. In February 2023, his Collection 11 show at Spring Studios took inspiration from the graffiti murals of artist Jason Naylor and from 1990s references including Fran Fine of The Nanny.

For Spring 2026, shown in September 2025, the evening dresses were finished with jewelry from Sister Love, the line by Simone I. Smith and Mary J. Blige, who sat front row. His Fall 2026 show, held at the New York Public Library Main Branch in February 2026, marked ten years of the label, with references including Aretha Franklin's performance at the 1998 Grammy Awards and Diahann Carroll's Dynasty character Dominique Deveraux. In September 2026, he presented his Spring/Summer 2027 collection at the Rainbow Room.

=== 2021 presidential inauguration ===
He is best known for dressing Vice President Kamala Harris and Michelle Obama during the 2021 US presidential inauguration proceedings, with both outfits making headlines, although it wasn't the first time Michelle Obama donned his clothes. In 2020, Hudson was asked to propose outfits for both women, and he has said that from the moment Obama walked out in his design, "everything's been different". At the ceremony, Obama wore a monochromatic plum overcoat, turtleneck, and wide-leg pants with one of his oversized belts; Harris's outfit was a black sequined cocktail dress and matching tuxedo overcoat. He has also dressed a number of celebrities, including Beyoncé, Rihanna, Jennifer Lopez, Tiffany Haddish, and Issa Rae.

=== Retail and collaborations ===
His ready-to-wear brand has since been picked up by numerous luxury fashion retailers, including Bergdorf Goodman and Neiman Marcus. The label's first stockist was Moda Operandi in 2021; by late 2022, it had grown to 15 retail accounts, also including Saks Fifth Avenue and Net-a-Porter. In 2022, Hudson released a capsule collection with Target priced from $20 to $70, and debuted on Amazon's Luxury Stores, which sponsored his Fall/Winter 2022 show. For the February 2022 show, he collaborated with Malone Souliers on footwear. In October 2026, OshKosh B'gosh announced a children's collection designed by Hudson, his first, developed in partnership with Harlem's Fashion Row, priced from $22 to $45, and set for release on October 22.

=== Met Gala ===
At the 2025 Met Gala, celebrating the exhibition "Superfine: Tailoring Black Style", Hudson dressed more than a dozen attendees, including Quinta Brunson, Stevie Wonder, and Jonquel Jones. For Spree AI CEO John Imah, Hudson, who had recently expanded his label into menswear, created a custom double-breasted ensemble with embroidery referencing Imah's Nigerian heritage.

== Exhibition ==
From November 2023 to July 2024, the Columbia Museum of Art presented "Sergio Hudson: Focused on the Fit", an exhibition pairing eight of his signature garments with more than twenty of his sketches. The garments on view included custom suits made for Issa Rae and Beyoncé, a suit worn by Megan Rapinoe at the 2021 Met Gala, and Keke Palmer's ensemble from the 2023 Met Gala.
