= Erin Wasson =

American model and actress (born 1982)

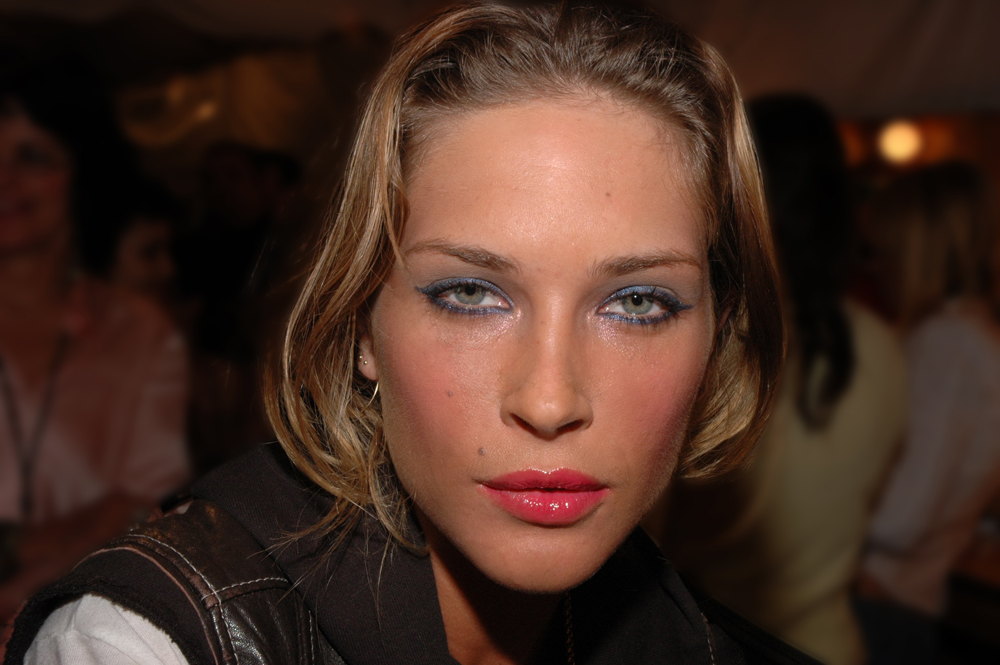
- Erin Wasson in 2005
- Born: Erin Elizabeth Wasson; January 20, 1982 (age 44); Irving, Texas, U.S.
- Spouse: Barthelemy Tassy (m. 2018)
- Modeling information
- Height: 1.78 m (5 ft 10 in)
- Hair color: Light brown
- Eye color: Blue-green
- Agency: IMG Models (New York, Milan, London, Sydney); Elite Model Management (Paris, Amsterdam, Barcelona, Copenhagen); Kim Dawson Agency (Dallas)

Erin Elizabeth Wasson (born January 20, 1982) is an American fashion model, actress, fashion designer, and stylist.

== Early life ==
Erin Elizabeth Wasson was born in Irving, Texas on January 20, 1982.

== Career ==
Wasson's modeling career began after winning the Kim Dawson Model Search in Texas.

She has appeared on the covers of numerous fashion magazines, including French, Russian, Spanish, and Australian Vogue, French Elle, Flair, Numero, Allure, and Esquire. She has worked with photographers such as Steven Meisel, Nan Goldin, Mario Testino, Peter Lindbergh, Patrick Demarchelier and Ellen Von Unwerth.

Wasson has walked the runway for Balenciaga, Loewe, Givenchy, Miu Miu, Alexander Wang, Chanel, Shiatzy Chen, Giorgio Armani, DKNY, Roberto Cavalli, Gucci, Anna Sui, Karl Lagerfeld, Alexander McQueen, Calvin Klein, Céline, Louis Vuitton, Badgley Mischka, Dolce & Gabbana, Lanvin, John Galliano, Marc Jacobs, Fendi, Jean Paul Gaultier, Valentino, Jil Sander, Versace, Alberta Ferretti, Oscar de la Renta, Dior, Max Azria, Diane Von Furstenberg, Hugo Boss, Moschino, Carolina Herrera, Dries Van Noten, Prada, Christian Lacroix, Balmain, Yves Saint Laurent, Michael Kors, Helmut Lang, Tommy Hilfiger, Zac Posen, Hermès, Chloé, Isabel Marant, Stella McCartney, Giles Deacon, and Ralph Lauren. She also walked in the Victoria's Secret Fashion Show in 2007.

She has appeared in advertising campaigns for Gucci, Chanel, Dolce & Gabbana, Michael Kors, DKNY, Valentino, Céline, Hugo Boss, Balenciaga, Giorgio Armani, Roberto Cavalli, Paco Rabanne, Blumarine, Cartier, Jil Sander, Alberta Ferretti, Tiffany & Co., Jean Paul Gaultier, Elie Saab, Ann Taylor, Esprit, Rolex, Tiffany & Co., J.Crew, Levi's, H&M, Abercrombie & Fitch, Gap, Scanlan & Theodore, and Zadig & Voltaire. Since 2002, Wasson has been the international face of Maybelline, Clinique, and Max Factor, appearing in print ads and television commercials for the cosmetics brands.

In the fall of 2008, she appeared opposite Justin Timberlake in a multimedia campaign for his clothing line, William Rast. The campaign includes a series of short films directed by Jonas Akerlund; Wasson plays Timberlake's love interest, Birdie. She also appeared in the 2011 Pirelli Calendar, photographed by Karl Lagerfeld.

Wasson appeared as the vampire Vadoma in the 2012 horror film Abraham Lincoln: Vampire Hunter.

In 2012 she starred in the music video for "Madness" by the English rock band Muse.

In 2008, she worked as a fashion designer for a three-season apparel collaboration with the clothing company RVCA. Wasson launched her line of jewelry, Low Luv, which is currently sold at more than 200 stores worldwide. In the fall of 2011, she designed a capsule collection for the French brand Zadig&Voltaire. In 2018, she designed a four-piece collection for boot brand Lucchese, which ranges in price from $1595–3995.

== Personal life ==
In July 2018, Wasson married restaurateur Bart Tassy in Austin, Texas.

Wasson is an art collector. Her collection includes artists Eric Swenson, Mark Flood, and Iván Navarro.

== Filmography ==
Film roles
Year	Title	Role	Notes
2010	Somewhere	Party Girl #1	
2012	Abraham Lincoln: Vampire Hunter	Vadoma	
2012	The Heimlich Maneuver	Dinner Guest	Short film
2013	L'Intruse	Marianne	Short film

Television roles
Year	Title	Role	Notes
2006	Beautiful People	N/A	Episode: "Best Face Forward"
2007	The Victoria's Secret Fashion Show	Herself / model	TV special
2011	America's Next Top Model	Guest Judge / Model / Designer	Episode: "Erin Wasson"
2011	Project Runway	Herself / Guest Judge	Episode: "Off the Track"
2013	Styled to Rock	Herself / Mentor	Episode: "Rihanna on the Runway"

Music videos
Year	Song	Artist	Role
2012	"Madness"	Muse	Girl on the Train

== Sources ==
- Elle; September 2003, Vol. 19 Issue 1, p371-381
- "Straight talk", Lie, Juliette, Flare, September 2005, Vol. 27, Issue 9
- "The Pucks Stopped Elsewhere", Peppard, Alan, Dallas Morning News, January 26, 2007
