= Vapor City =

Studio album by Machinedrum
- Released: September 30, 2013
- Genre: Electronic; IDM; footwork; jungle
- Length: 52:59
- Label: Ninja Tune

Machinedrum chronology
| Room(s) (2011) | Vapor City (2013) | Vapor City Archives (2014) |

Vapor City is a studio album by American record producer Travis Stewart under the pseudonym Machinedrum. It was released on September 30, 2013, through Ninja Tune. It peaked at number 31 on the UK Dance Albums Chart. It received generally favorable reviews from critics.

== Production ==
The concept for Vapor City came about through a series of vivid, recurring dreams Travis Stewart had about a fictional city. Each track on the album is meant to explore and define a different district or neighborhood within this world.

== Release ==
Soon after the album's release, an interactive website was launched allowing fans and subscribers to 'unlock' the various districts of Vapor City, granting them access to exclusive content and unheard music.

== Critical reception ==
Professional ratings
Aggregate scores
| Source | Rating |
|---|---|
| Metacritic | 73/100 |
Review scores
| Source | Rating |
| Clash | 8/10 |
| Exclaim! | 7/10 |
| Fact | 4/5 stars |
| Mixmag | 4/5 stars |
| NME | 7/10 |
| The Observer | 3/5 stars |
| Pitchfork | 7.8/10 |
| Resident Advisor | 4/5 |
| Rolling Stone | 3.5/5 stars |
| XLR8R | 8/10 |

According to the review aggregator Metacritic, Vapor City received "generally favorable reviews" based on a weighted average score of 73 out of 100 from 15 critic scores.

Daniel Sylvester of Exclaim! stated, "Delving further into the bent vocal samples and click-clack polyrhythms that defined his preceding releases, Vapor City nonetheless benefits from a new crop of songs that feel simultaneously rubbery and dense." He added, "On Vapor City, Machinedrum steers clear of dramatic style makeovers, opting to focus on sharpening his craft while leaving the listener with a collection of songs that operates on pure magnetism and unbridled confidence." Angus Finlayson of Fact noted Travis Stewart's of-the-moment blend of footwork, jungle, and bass influences.

=== Accolades ===
Year-end lists for Vapor City
| Publication | List | Rank | Ref. |
|---|---|---|---|
| Clash | Clash's Top Albums of 2013 | 16 | |

== Track listing ==
All tracks are written by Travis Stewart.

Vapor City track listing
| No. | Title | Length |
|---|---|---|
| 1. | "Gunshotta" | 5:46 |
| 2. | "Infinite Us" | 7:11 |
| 3. | "Don't 1 2 Lose U" | 4:17 |
| 4. | "Center Your Love" | 4:46 |
| 5. | "Vizion" | 2:38 |
| 6. | "Rise n Fall" | 5:35 |
| 7. | "SeeSea" | 4:16 |
| 8. | "U Still Lie" | 4:28 |
| 9. | "Eyesdontlie" | 6:39 |
| 10. | "Baby It's U" | 7:23 |
| Total length: | | 52:59 |

== Personnel ==
Credits adapted from liner notes.

- Travis Stewart – performance
- Angelica Bess – vocals (4)
- Jesse Boykins III – vocals (10)
- Richard Devine – hydrophone recording (10)
- Dominic Flannigan – design
- Eclair Fifi – design

== Charts ==
Chart performance for Vapor City
| Chart (2013) | Peak position |
|---|---|
| UK Dance Albums (OCC) | 31 |
