= Past Is Prologue (album) =

2004 studio album by Tycho

Studio album by Tycho
- Released: September 24, 2004 (Sunrise Projector); October 25, 2006 (Past Is Prologue); January 23, 2007 (EP); June 1, 2010 (Reissue)
- Genre: Downtempo
- Length: 63:22
- Label: Gammaphone (Sunrise Projector); Merck (Past Is Prologue & EP); Ghostly (Reissue)

Tycho chronology
Sunrise Projector (2004)	Past Is Prologue (2006)	Dive (2011)

Professional ratings
Review scores
Source	Rating
AllMusic	4/5 stars

Past Is Prologue is the debut studio album by the American ambient music project Tycho. It was originally released under the title Sunrise Projector in 2004, before being re-released by Merck Records in 2006 (and 2007 as an EP sampler), and reissued by Ghostly International in 2010. The album title is a reference to a famous line from Shakespeare's The Tempest.

== Track listing ==
=== Sunrise Projector (2004 original) ===
No.	Title	Length
1.	"Sunrise Projector"	3:03
2.	"Dictaphone's Lament"	5:09
3.	"PBS / KAE"	4:39
4.	"Phoenix Cylinder"	1:26
5.	"Overlook"	5:42
6.	"Lapse"	5:20
7.	"Send and Receive"	4:46
8.	"Past Is Prologue"	5:47
9.	"You Should Be More Like Your Brother"	1:43
10.	"A Circular Reeducation"	5:18
11.	"Cloud Generator"	4:19
12.	"Sunrise Calendar"	3:09
13.	"Send and Receive" (Chachi Jones Remix)	5:56
Total length:		56:17

=== Past Is Prologue (2006 re-release) ===
No.	Title	Length
1.	"From Home"	6:31
2.	"Sunrise Projector"	3:04
3.	"Dictaphone's Lament"	5:10
4.	"PBS"	4:40
5.	"Send and Receive"	4:53
6.	"Brother"	1:42
7.	"A Circular Reeducation"	5:26
8.	"Past Is Prologue"	5:50
9.	"Cloud Generator"	4:21
10.	"The Disconnect"	6:11
11.	"A Circular Reeducation" (Dusty Brown Remix)	5:42
12.	"Send and Receive" (Chachi Jones Remix)	5:57
13.	"Sunrise Projector" (Nautilis Remix)	3:55
Total length:		63:22

=== Past Is Prologue (Sampler) (2007 EP) ===
No.	Title	Length
1.	"From Home"	6:30
2.	"The Disconnect"	6:13
3.	"PBS"	4:41
4.	"A Circular Reeducation" (Dusty Brown Remix)	5:26
5.	"Sunrise Projector" (Nautilis Remix)	3:55
Total length:		26:45

=== Past Is Prologue (2010 reissue) ===
No.	Title	Length
1.	"From Home"	6:31
2.	"Sunrise Projector"	3:04
3.	"Dictaphone's Lament"	5:10
4.	"PBS"	4:40
5.	"Send and Receive"	4:53
6.	"Brother"	1:42
7.	"A Circular Reeducation"	5:26
8.	"Past Is Prologue"	5:50
9.	"Cloud Generator"	4:21
10.	"The Disconnect"	6:11
11.	"Cascade"	3:58
12.	"Phoenix"	1:26
13.	"Send and Receive" (Chachi Jones Remix)	5:42
14.	"Sunrise Projector" (Nautilis Remix)	5:57
15.	"From Home" (Mux Mool Remix)	3:55
16.	"A Circular Reeducation" (Dusty Brown Remix)	3:59
Total length:		72:45
