= Epoch (Tycho album) =

Studio album by Tycho
- Released: September 30, 2016
- Genre: Electronic; ambient; post-rock
- Length: 42:54
- Label: Ghostly International
- Producer: Scott Hansen

Tycho chronology
Awake (2014)	Epoch (2016)	Weather (2019)

Epoch is the fourth studio album by the ambient music project Tycho, released on 30 September 2016 on Ghostly International. It is the final album in a 'trilogy' by the project, beginning in 2011 with Dive and continuing with Awake in 2014.

The album debuted at the top of the Billboard Dance/Electronic Albums chart. The album received generally positive reviews from critics and was nominated for Best Dance/Electronic Album at the 59th Grammy Awards.

== Critical reception ==
Professional ratings
Aggregate scores
Source	Rating
Metacritic	76/100
Review scores
Source	Rating
AllMusic	4/5 stars
Clash	7/8
Exclaim!	9/10
PopMatters	8/10 stars
Uncut	8/10
The Guardian	2/5 stars

Epoch received generally positive reviews from critics, having been assigned a normalized score of 76 from review aggregator Metacritic.

== Track listing ==
No.	Title	Writer(s)	Length
1.	"Glider"	Scott Hansen; Zac Brown	4:53
2.	"Horizon"	Hansen; Brown	4:09
3.	"Slack"	Hansen; Brown	4:11
4.	"Receiver"	Hansen	4:15
5.	"Epoch"	Hansen	5:45
6.	"Division"	Hansen; Brown	3:58
7.	"Source"	Hansen	4:18
8.	"Local"	Hansen	2:53
9.	"Rings"	Hansen	4:08
10.	"Continuum"	Hansen	1:44
11.	"Field"	Hansen	2:40
Total length:			42:50

== Personnel ==
Credits adapted from the liner notes of Epoch.

- Scott Hansen – producer, guitar, keyboards, bass, drum programming, arrangement, artwork
- Zac Brown – bass, guitar, arrangement
- Rory O'Connor – live drums
- Count – mastering, mixing, production consultant
- Songs 1, 2, 3 live drums recorded by Anthony Gallo at Virtue And Vice Studio
- Additional live drum recording by Peter Franco at Panoramic Studios

== Charts ==
Chart (2016–17)	Peak position
Belgian Albums (Ultratop Flanders)	170
New Zealand Heatseeker Albums (RMNZ)	10
US Billboard 200	78
US Top Dance/Electronic Albums (Billboard)	1
