= Machinedrum =

American record producer (born 1982)

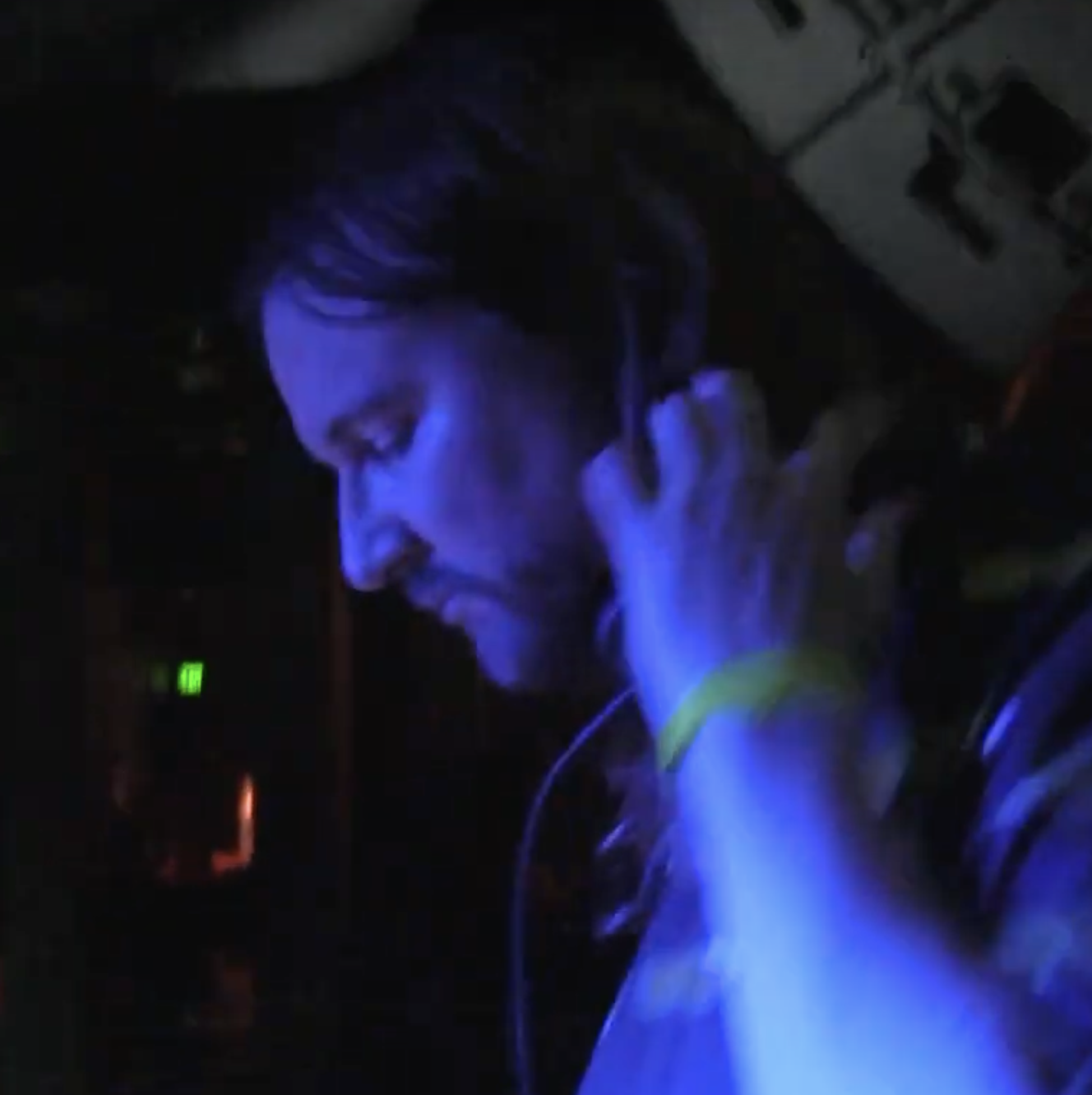
- Machinedrum in 2021

Background information
- Also known as: Syndrone, tstewart, Neon Black, Aden
- Born: Travis Stewart; March 4, 1982 (age 44); Eden, North Carolina, U.S.
- Genres: IDM; house; glitch hop
- Occupation: Record producer
- Instruments: Sequencer, keyboard, computer, sampler
- Years active: 2000–present
- Labels: Ninja Tune; LuckyMe; Merck Records; Planet Mu; Hotflush; Moodgadget (as Tstewart); Mercury KX (as tstewart)
- Member of: Sepalcure
- Website: www.machinedrum.net

Travis Stewart (born March 4, 1982), better known as Machinedrum, is an American electronic record producer and performer from North Carolina. He has also recorded as Syndrone and Tstewart. He is one half of Sepalcure, with Praveen Sharma, one half of JETS, with Jimmy Edgar, as well as half of Dream Continuum with Jim Coles, a.k.a. Om Unit.

== Biography ==
Travis Stewart was born in Eden, North Carolina. He was exposed to a wide range of musical influences in his childhood. His grandfather played pedal steel for a country band, and gave Stewart his first guitar. His first recordings were made at his grandparents' house, around the age of 5 or 6. His parents kept a house full of instruments, and a singer-songwriter cousin continually exposed him to new sounds and ideas. He fostered an interest with polyrhythms while playing marching snare in his high school band, and the djembe in an African ensemble. Stewart played in two local alternative bands, marching band, jazz band as well as several percussion ensembles before turning more towards electronic music around the time of 8th grade. Using handed down computers, he began to produce his own music, and connected with a community of likeminded musicians over the Internet. He started the Machinedrum project during his final two years of high school, between 1998 and 1999. After graduation, he attended Full Sail University in Florida to study audio engineering. In 2001, at the age of 19, he released his first record as Machinedrum, "Now You Know", on Merck Records.

Following college, Stewart moved to New York City and got involved with Brooklyn-based boutique label Normrex, and has during that time collaborated with such artists as Tiombe Lockhart, Theophilus London, Jesse Boykins III, Azealia Banks and Mickey Factz, among others. For Theophilus London, Stewart produced and mixed the Jam Mixtape as well as This Charming Mixtape. For Azealia Banks, he produced the tracks Barbie Shit, Luxury, 1991, Van Vogue, L8R, and Fantasea among others. From 2001–2010, Stewart is credited for having released 8 albums, as well as numerous remixes, mixes, singles, and EPs.

Stewart's collaboration with Praveen Sharma, known as Sepalcure, began after the two had collaborated on parties Percussion Lab and Cassette NYC, then decided to record music together, which gained the attention of Hotflush Recordings, who signed the duo. Pitchfork considered their self-titled LP one of 2011's Top 50 albums, and the song "Pencil Pimp" made the list of 2011's Top 100 Tracks. In 2010, Stewart and Sharma wrote and performed the song "Outside the Lines" for the film Black Swan.

Also in 2010, Stewart signed to the label LuckyMe and released the Many Faces EP, followed by the "Alarma" single in 2011 and the SXLND EP in 2012. In 2011, Stewart released the album Room(s), on Planet Mu. The album was made mostly on the road, with Stewart limited to his laptop and headphones. His single "She Died There" was featured in the video game Grand Theft Auto V on the fictional radio station FlyLo FM.. In 2013, Stewart signed to Ninja Tune and announced his debut LP for the label, Vapor City which was to be released later that year. Since then Machinedrum has released two more LPs on Ninja Tune: Human Energy in 2016 and A View Of U in 2020. Additionally he went on to produce most of Dawn Richard's 2016 album "Redemption", as well as collaborated with artists like A$AP Ferg, Freddie Gibbs, Sub Focus, Rochelle Jordan, Tigran Hamasyan and many more.

JETS, a collaboration formed in 2012 between Stewart and long time friend Jimmy Edgar, have released 1 LP "Zoospa" and 3 EPs together. They continue to produce music for artists like Tanerélle, Flohio, and B-La-B as well as collaborating with artists like Tkay Maidza, Theophilus London, Dawn Richard, Mykki Blanco and Roses Gabor.

Travis has recently scored the music for a new German true crime drama series called "Das Geheimnis Des Totenwaldes".

As a performer, Stewart has played such venues as the Sydney Opera House, Palladium Times Square in New York City, Zócalo Plaza in Mexico City, The Roundhouse in London, the Sonar Music Festival '11, '12, '14 and '15 in Barcelona, and SXSW.

== Discography ==
=== As Machinedrum ===
==== Albums ====
Title	Details
Now You Know	Released: February 1, 2001; Label: Merck; Formats: LP, CD, digital download, streaming
Urban Biology	Released: August 25, 2002; Label: Merck, IAMSIAM; Formats: LP, CD, digital download, streaming
Bidnezz	Released: October 1, 2004; Label: Merck, IAMSIAM; Formats: LP, CD, digital download, streaming
Cached	Released: October 3, 2006; Label: The Inside; Formats: LP
Want to 1 2?	Released: April 12, 2009; Label: Normrex, IAMSIAM; Formats: LP, CD, digital download, streaming
Room(s)	Released: July 25, 2011; Label: Planet Mu, IAMSIAM; Formats: LP, CD, digital download, streaming
Vapor City	Released: September 30, 2013; Label: Ninja Tune; Formats: LP, CD, digital download, streaming
Vapor City Archives	Released: November 17, 2014; Label: Ninja Tune; Formats: LP, CD, digital download, streaming
Human Energy	Released: September 30, 2016; Label: Ninja Tune; Formats: LP, CD, digital download, streaming
A View of U	Released: October 9, 2020; Label: Ninja Tune; Formats: LP, CD, digital download, streaming
3FOR82	Released: May 24, 2024; Label: Ninja Tune; Formats: LP, cassette, digital download, streaming
3FOR82_D3LUX3	Released: October 25, 2024; Label: Ninja Tune; Formats: Digital download, streaming

==== Compilations ====
Title	Details
Half the Battle	Released: September 1, 2002; Label: Merck; Formats: CD, digital download
Mergerz & Acquisitionz	Released: March 14, 2006; Label: Merck; Formats: LP, CD, digital download
3RMX82	Released: March 4, 2025; Label: Ninja Tune; Formats: Digital download, streaming

==== EPs ====
- Half the Battle – Merck (2002)
- Half the Battle 2 – Merck (2003)
- Half the Battle 3 – Merck (2004)
- Late Night Operation – Normrex (2009)
- Many Faces – LuckyMe (2010)
- Let It – Innovative Leisure (2010)
- Sacred Frequency – Planet Mu (2011)
- Alarma – LuckyMe (2011)
- Ecstasy Boom (Edits) – Independent (2011)
- SXLND – LuckyMe (2012)
- Nastyfuckk – The Index (2012)
- Gunshotta Ave. – Ninja Tune (2013)
- Vizion Centre – Vapor City Citizenship Programme (2013)
- Vapor Park – Vapor City Citizenship Programme (2014)
- Fenris District – Ninja Tune (2014)
- Berry Patch (with Holly) – Vision Recordings (2020)
- Psyconia – Ninja Tune (2021)
- 天の川[River Of Heaven] (with Holly) – Vision Recordings (2023)
- 4#TRAX – Ninja Tune (2023)
- Bl00ms – Self-released (2026)

==== Singles ====
- "$$ Life / The Way" – TLM Records (2011)
- "Eyesdontlie" – Ninja Tune (2013)
- "Want Me" – Adult Swim (2014)
- "U Betta" – Ninja Tune (2017)
- "What Is This" – Ninja Tune (2017)
- "1 2 B Needed" – Ninja Tune (2017)
- "Hype Up" – Ninja Tune (2018)

=== As Tstewart ===
- Living Exponentially – Merck (2006)
- Elysian – A Mercury KX Release (2022)

=== As Syndrone ===
- Triskaideka – Merck (2000)
- Triskaideka EP – Merck (2001)
- Salmataxia – Merck (2004)

=== As JETS (with Jimmy Edgar) ===
- JETS EP – Leisure System (2012)
- The Chants EP – Ultramajic (2015)
- ZOOSPA – Innovative Leisure (2019)
- Zaps EP – Innovative Leisure (2019)

=== As Sepalcure (with Praveen Sharma) ===
- Love Pressure EP – Hotflush (2010)
- Fleur EP – Hotflush (2011)
- Sepalcure – Hotflush (2011)
- Make You EP – Hotflush (2013)
- Folding Time – Hotflush (2016)
- Dial Your Line (feat. Kevin Hussein) (Single) – IAMSIAM (2018)

=== As Dream Continuum (with Om Unit) ===
- Reworkz EP – Planet Mu (2012)
- Ride Away (Single) – Astrophonica (2018)

=== Remixes ===
- Sound Tribe Sector 9 – "Tokyo (Machinedrum Remix)" (2005)
- Edit – "Certified Air Raid Material (Machinedrum Remix)"
- Mochipet – "African Trampoline (Machinedrum Mix)" (2008)
- New Villager – "Rich Doors (Machinedrum Remix)"
- Grems – "Brokabilly (Machinedrum Remix)" (featuring Foreign Beggars)
- Sub Swara – "Speak My Language (Machinedrum Remix)"(featuring Dead Prez)
- Lazer Sword – "Gucci Sweatshirt (Neon Black Mix)" (2009)
- Solange – "Sandcastle Disco (Machinedrum Remix)"
- Johnny Cash – "Belshazzar (Machinedrum Remix)" (2010)
- Dominique Young Unique – "Stupid Pretty (Machinedrum Remix)" (2011)
- Jacques Greene – "The Look (Machinedrum Remix)" (2011)
- The Glitch Mob – "Between Two Dreams (Machinedrum Convergence)" (2011)
- Salva – "Keys Open Doors (Machinedrum Remix)" (2011)
- Scuba – "M.A.R.S (Machinedrum Remix)" (2011)
- Son of Kick – "Playing the Villain (Machinedrum Remix)" (2011)
- Bonobo – "Eyesdown (Machinedrum Remix)" (featuring Andreya Triana) (2012)
- Gang Colours – "Fancy Restaurant (Machinedrum Remix)" (2013)
- Body Language – "Really Love (Machinedrum Remix)" (2015)
- Tropics – "Blame (Machinedrum Remix)" (2015)
- Rudimental – "Rumour Mill (Machinedrum Remix)" (featuring Will Heard, Anne-Marie) (2016)
- Noisia – "Get Deaded (Machinedrum Remix)" (2017)
- patten – "Sonne (Machinedrum Remix)" (2017)
- Sylvan Esso – "Kick Jump Twist (Machinedrum Remix)" (2017)
- Chrome Sparks – "What's It Gonna Take (Machinedrum Remix)" (featuring Angelica Bess) (2018)
- Dugong Jr. – "Holding On (Machinedrum Remix)" (featuring Austen) (2019)
- Hermitude – "Stupid World (Machinedrum Remix)" (featuring Bibi Bourelly) (2020)
- Boards of Canada – "Untitled Warp 10 Birthday Party 1999 Bootleg (Machinedrum Edit)"
- Mouth Water – "EXIT (Machinedrum Remix)" & "EXIT (Machinedrum Remix Instrumental)" (2022)
- IMANU – "Haunt My Mind (Machinedrum Remix)" (2023)
- ††† (Crosses) – "Day One (Machinedrum Remix)" (2023)
- Glen Check – "Dive Baby, Dive (Machinedrum Remix)" (2023)
- Duñe – "I'd Better (Machinedrum Remix)" (2023)
- BRUX – "CA$HED UP (Machinedrum Remix)" (featuring Baauer, Surya Sen) (2025)
- Danny Daze – "Entity (Machinedrum Remix)" (2025)
