= Soulseek =

Peer-to-peer file-sharing network

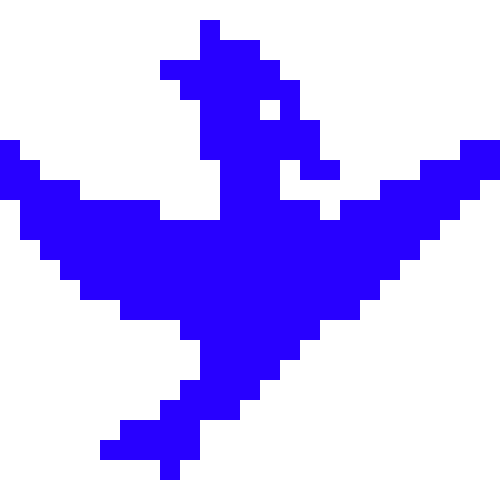

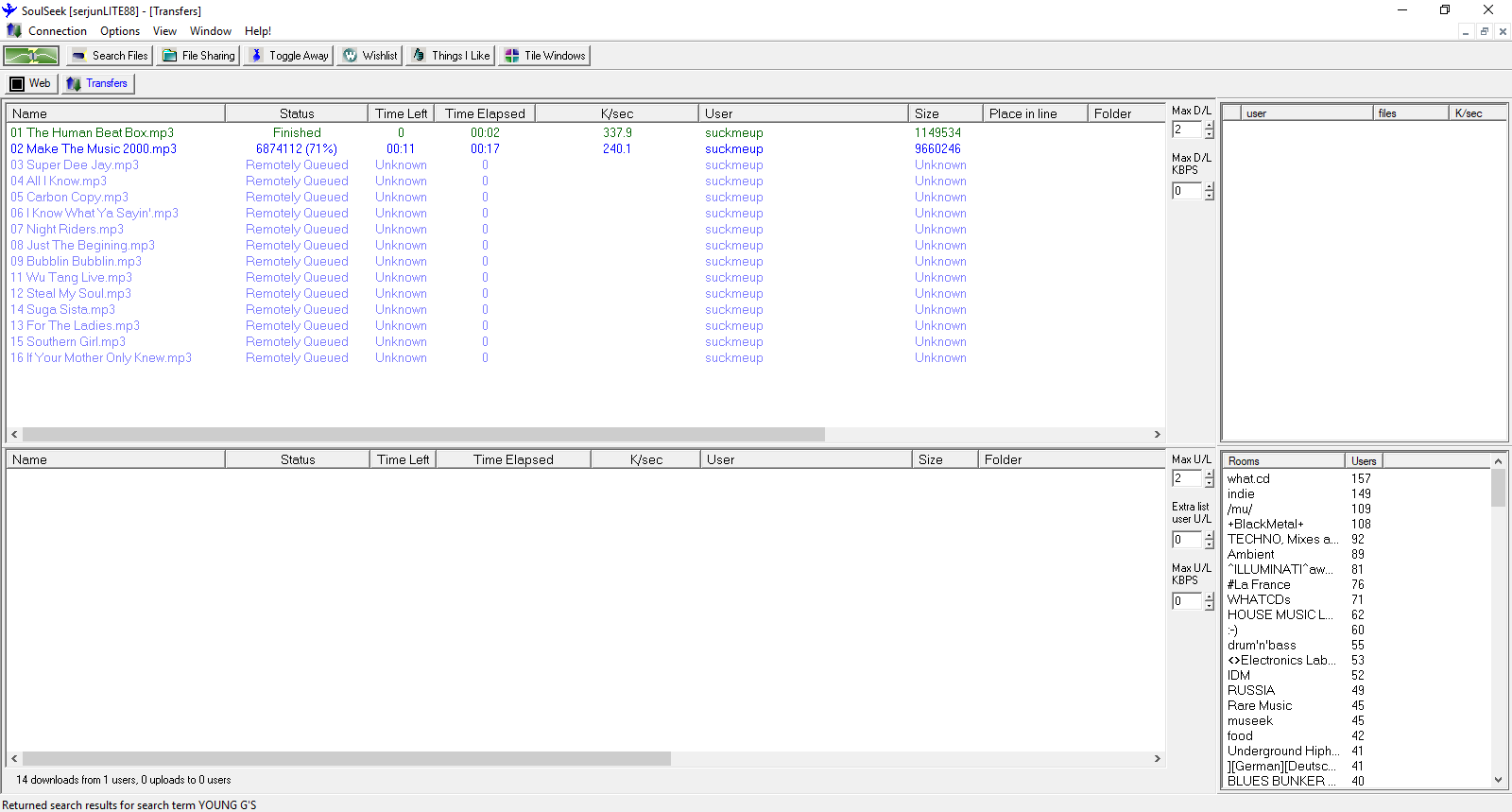
- Screenshot of the older Soulseek 157 NS 13e client version on Microsoft Windows
- Developer: Nir Arbel
- Release: April 8, 2001; 25 years ago
- Stable release: SoulseekQt build 2026.04.30 (April 30, 2026; 6 months ago) [±]
- Preview release: None [±]
- Written in: C++, Qt
- Operating system: Microsoft Windows, macOS, and Linux in the newest Qt client
- Available in: English, Dutch, French, German, Italian, Russian, Spanish, Polish, Estonian
- Type: Peer-to-peer file sharing
- License: Proprietary freeware
- Website: www.slsknet.org

Soulseek is a peer-to-peer (P2P) file sharing network and application. It is known mostly for the exchange of music, though it can be used for other file types as well.

The current Soulseek network, hosted on the client SoulseekQt, is the second to have been in operation; the older network, used up to version 156 of the client, was shut down after significant user inactivity. Version 157 of the client was the last for Microsoft Windows only, and work on it ceased in 2008. SoulseekQt is available for Windows, macOS, and Linux, and has different functionality to the 157 client interface.

== Key features ==
=== Content ===
As a peer-to-peer (P2P) file sharing program, the accessible content is determined by the users of the Soulseek client, and what files they choose to share. The network has historically been used mainly for music, with a diverse mix including underground and independent artists, unreleased music, such as demos and mixtapes, bootlegs, live tracks, and live DJ sets, but releases from major and independent labels can also be found.

Soulseek does not support multi-source downloading or torrent-style "swarming" like other post-Napster clients, and must fetch a requested file from a single source linearly. All Soulseek clients contain a ban feature whereby selected users may be banned from requesting files. This is in response to users who might be free-riding (i.e. taking files from others without sharing any files themselves) or who might be causing a nuisance for other reasons, such as a personal argument through the online chat facilities or just taking up a user's bandwidth by downloading too many files, or simply on the whim of the banning user. Users with download privileges can still be banned.

=== Central server and search engine ===
Soulseek depends on a pair of central servers. One server supports the original client and network Version 156, with the other supporting the newer network (functioning with clients 157 and Qt). While these central servers are key to coordinating searches and hosting chat rooms, they do not actually play a part in the transfer of files between users, which takes place directly between the users concerned. (See Single Source Downloads below).

Users can search for items; the results returned being a list of files whose names match the search term used. Searches may be explicit or may use wildcards/patterns or terms to be excluded. For example, searching for blue suede -shoes will return a list of files whose names contain the strings blue and suede, but files containing the string shoes in their names will be excluded.

A feature specific to the Soulseek search engine is the inclusion of the folder names and file paths in the search list. This allows users to search by folder name. For example, typing in experimental will return all the files that are contained in folders having that name, providing quick access to bands and albums in a determined musical genre. The list of search results shows details, such as the full name and path of the file, its size, the user who is hosting the file, together with that users' average transfer rate, and brief details about the encoded track itself, such as bit rate, length, etc. The resulting search list may then be sorted in a variety of ways and individual files (or folders) chosen for download. The Soulseek protocol search algorithms are not published, as those algorithms run on the server.

While Soulseek, like other P2P clients, allows a user to download individual files from another by selecting each one from a list of search results, a "Download Containing Folder" option simplifies the downloading of entire albums. For example, a user who wishes to facilitate the distribution of an entire album may place all tracks relating to the album together in a folder on the host PC, and the entire contents of that folder (i.e. all the album's track files) can then be downloaded automatically one after the other using this one command. The Soulseek client features two file transfer monitoring windows where the progress of files being uploaded and downloaded can be monitored and controlled.

The Soulseek 156, 157 and Qt clients provide a "wishlist" feature which functions like a stored search. Search terms are input as entries in a wishlist and each wishlist entry is then periodically executed as a search automatically by the client software, returning results as appropriate.

=== Financing ===
Soulseek is entirely financed by donations, with no advertising or user fees. Nir Arbel writes, as of July 1, 2008:

I would also like to take this opportunity to address some of the lies that have been spread about our lifestyle and the money we make off Soulseek. We live from hand to mouth. A few months ago we had to let go of sierracat, our system admin, despite his excellent work, because we could no longer afford his services. We are pretty heavily in debt. We are fighting a legal battle in France. We are not poor nor starving, but neither of us drives a fancy car nor could we begin to afford one if we wanted to. I don't like discussing money issues, but I feel it necessary to defend ourselves from accusations that are, and have always been, patently untrue. With that, I would like to thank you all for using Soulseek and making it a significant, if not hugely popular or successful, experience. Thanks.

While the Soulseek software is free, a donation service is available to support the programming effort and cost of maintaining the servers. In return for donations, users are granted privileges of temporarily automatically jump ahead of non-donating users in a queue when downloading files (but only if the files are not shared over a local area network), for a duration usually set by the donation.

== History ==
The original Soulseek user base around 2000 was composed mostly of members of the IDM mailing list, and most of the music first found on Soulseek was underground electronic music or music created by the users themselves. Aided by Soulseek users, the developer Nir Arbel released new versions of the client very frequently, in response to user requests for new features or bug fixes.

There is no known published usage data. Soulseek got a first boost in 2001 when Napster was closed down and then a second boost in 2002 when the site Audiogalaxy was closed down. Nir Arbel stated in an interview published December 26, 2003 that there were, at that time, over a million registered usernames and that 80,000–100,000 users log on during peak hours. The increase in Soulseek users after the shutdown of Audiogalaxy was plainly evident from a before-and-after comparison of chat room populations. Before the shutdown of its competitor, Soulseek's most-joined chat rooms averaged 50 or so people. After the shutdown, the population of these chat rooms increased to 100 or more.

Soulseek was taken to court in 2008 by French music industry lobbying groups, alleging that Soulseek was designed to permit unauthorized access to copyrighted works. In the following years, it has implemented industrially contributed blacklists for entities whose management has issued cease and desist orders, and Soulseek's website subsequently made the statement that it:

does not endorse nor condone the sharing of copyrighted materials. You should only share and download files which you are legally allowed to, or have otherwise received permission to, share.

Soulseek has remained more of a community than a simple file sharing client, with users connecting with other users sharing similar music tastes to share files and to chat. Users even have the ability to create their own chatrooms and invite other users with similar tastes. In summer 2004, Soulseek users from all the world met in Augsburg, Germany. Every year since then, that meeting still takes place at a digital arts festival called Lab30 (30 being the street number of the Abraxas Theater) in Augsburg, Germany, organized by longtime Soulseek user Manfred Genther and other Augsburg locals. This festival focuses on showcasing digital musicians, digital artists, and netlabels from all over the world. Many Soulseek artists have performed at the festival, and a large number of them have performed live for the first time there. Lab30 has steadily grown in size since the first event and continues to be a meeting place for the musicians and users of Soulseek. Attendees usually come from all over Europe and the United States. Lab30 is a well known event in Augsburg and widely supported and cherished by the Augsburg music and art scene.

=== Versions ===
The first release was 139, which ran for about 12 months from 2002–03. Following a change in servers, a new version was released to coincide with this event. Whilst the main interface has largely remained unchanged since its inception, additional features such as the chat room 'ticker' were introduced into the 156 version.

Version 156 first appeared in 2005. A second 'test' version of the server, version 157, was set up shortly afterwards, which became the primary client in 2008.

Since July 6, 2008, there have been two versions of the Soulseek client, with entirely different users, user groups, and files. The older version, v.156 is progressively being wound down, but still operates as of August 2011, albeit with few users. Users are not obligated to upgrade, and new users may still inadvertently download the 156 client.

The 157 "test" network has been around since 2005, to circumvent poor search capability on the 156 client. The v.157 test 12c was released in November 2007. All recent versions have several bugs which can hang or cause the system to stop searching or downloading.

The client SoulseekQT Public Build 1 was released in 04/19/2011.

For the older clients (156 and 157) no official client was developed for non-Windows operating systems, but a number of unofficial third-party clients existed at the time. Development of third-party clients was discouraged (but not prohibited), as coding errors or explicit circumvention of network rules in third-party clients had, at times, a drastic negative impact on the Soulseek network.

== Alternative clients ==
Nicotine+ is an actively maintained fork of the now defunct Nicotine client. Nicotine+ uses a graphical user interface, and runs under Linux, *BSD, Solaris, Windows, and macOS. It is currently maintained by a team of volunteers with its source hosted on GitHub. It uses GTK 4, Python 3, and supports UPnP. Stable and unstable packages are available for Alpine Linux Edge, Arch Linux, Debian, Fedora, Gentoo, Manjaro, NixOS, OpenBSD, Parabola, Solus, T2 SDE and Void Linux. Nicotine+ is also available as a Flatpak, as of release version 2.0.0 and Snap.

Nicotine+'s defunct predecessor Nicotine also ran on all Unix-based systems, such as Mac OS X, and on Microsoft Windows. It is in turn based on the original PySoulSeek project. It may still be available from some package distributors on Linux-based systems.

PySoulSeek was a Soulseek client written in Python that runs under Linux/FreeBSD/Solaris and other Unix-based operating systems. PySoulSeek runs under Mac OS X but with some difficulty.

slskd and Museek+ are Soulseek clients utilizing a client-server model, though the latter is no longer under development.

Seeker is a Soulseek client for modern Android devices. GoSeek was a Soulseek client for older Android devices (before Android Nougat).

MewSeek was originally iSlsk, a Soulseek client for iPod Touch and iPhone clients running jailbroken versions of iOS. MewSeek no longer supports Soulseek.

Clients for Mac OS X included Soulseex (ssX) and iSoul. iSoul was based on an earlier client called Solarseek.
