= Lateduster =

American instrumental music group

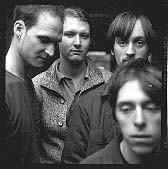

Background information
- Origin: Minneapolis, Minnesota, United States
- Genres: Instrumental rock, post-rock
- Years active: 1999-2003
- Labels: Firetrunk Records, Merck Records
- Members: Andrew Broder; Martin Dosh; JG Everest; Bryan Olson

Lateduster is an American instrumental music group from Minneapolis, Minnesota. It was most active between 1999 and 2003, with reunion shows in 2005, 2011, 2013, 2014, and 2019. The band's core members were Andrew Broder, Martin Dosh, J.G. Everest and Bryan Olson.

== Style ==
Lateduster was considered a Minneapolis "supergroup" because all four members were active in other successful bands and projects. They were also considered pioneering in their combination of live and electronic instrumentation, and their unconventional use of instruments such as turntables, looping pedals, and fender rhodes electric piano in the "post-rock" genre. Lateduster composed and performed instrumental mood music with a combination of live drums, guitars, turntables, fender rhodes, and keys run through a myriad of effects and live looping pedals.

== History ==
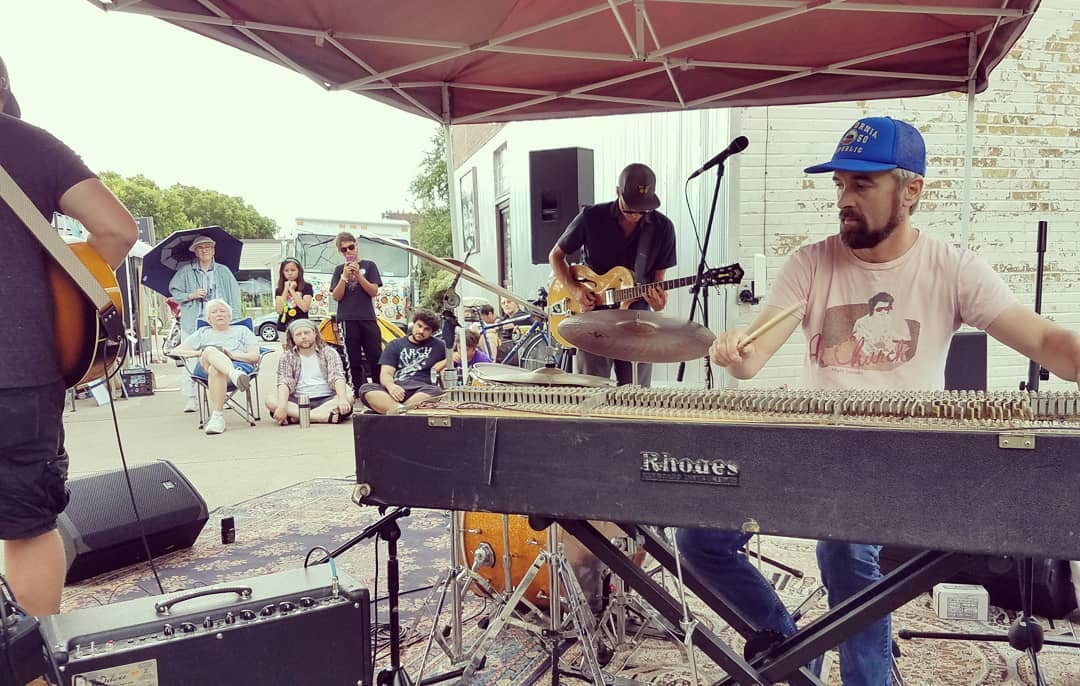
Lateduster performs at Open Streets Minneapolis, July 21, 2019

Formed in Minneapolis in 1999, Lateduster was originally an instrumental sextet called Cropduster, with a symmetrical lineup of two guitars, two full drum kits and two DJs on four turntables. By the beginning of 2000, they had pared themselves down to a four-piece and began honing their sound into intricately arranged chamber music. In 2000, they recorded and released the first of three "handmade" EPs, independently released on their own Firetrunk Records label. In 2002, the best tracks from these early recordings were remastered and compiled on the first album Lateduster, which included two newly recorded songs. During the summer and fall of 2002, Lateduster completed the second album Five Easy Pieces, which was released on Firetrunk in 2002. Over the winter of 2002 to 2003, the band continued work on a new original soundtrack to the 1925 silent German Expressionist film Varieté, which they had performed live at the Sound Unseen Film Festival in 2001. In 2003, Lateduster released the first DVD Plain Old Andrea, With A Gun, a collaborative project with Alaska-born choreographer Emily Johnson and her contemporary dance company Catalyst.

After three years of performing and recording, and self-releasing 5 CDs and a DVD, Lateduster went on hiatus in Spring 2003 after Andrew Broder left the group and Bryan Olson moved to San Francisco. The various members then went on to be part of several other music projects, Fog, Hymie's Basement, Dosh, Andrew Bird, Neotropic, Sans Le Systeme, The Cloak Ox, Roma di Luna, Vicious Vicious and the Catalyst dance company. In 2003, Merck Records discovered Lateduster’s music, and decided to do the first major label release of their music in fall 2004 as Easy Pieces, a compilation of previously released material.

== Discography ==
- EP1 (2000)
- EP2 (2001)
- EP3 (2001)
- Lateduster (2002)
- Five Easy Pieces (2002)
- Plain Old Andrea, With A Gun (2003)
- Easy Pieces (2004)
