= Simulcast (album) =

Studio album by Tycho
- Released: February 28, 2020
- Genres: Ambient; electronic; IDM; post-rock
- Length: 34:34
- Labels: Mom + Pop; Ninja Tune

Tycho chronology
Weather (2019)	Simulcast (2020)	Infinite Health (2024)

Professional ratings
Aggregate scores
Source	Rating
Metacritic	67/100
Review scores
Source	Rating
AllMusic	3.5/5 stars
Clash	7/10
Exclaim!	9/10
Pitchfork	5/10

Simulcast is the sixth studio album by American musician Tycho. It was released on February 28, 2020 under Mom + Pop Music and Ninja Tune.

== Recording ==
Simulcast reworks the vocal tracks from Tycho’s previous album Weather. The vocals were removed and the instrumentation was expanded upon.

== Critical reception ==
Simulcast was met with generally favorable reviews from critics. Metacritic gave the album an average score of 67, based on 4 reviews.

== Track listing ==
All tracks are written by Tycho.

Simulcast track listing
No.	Title	Length
1.	"Weather"	4:14
2.	"Alright"	4:02
3.	"Outer Sunset"	4:10
4.	"Into the Woods"	4:02
5.	"Easy"	3:26
6.	"PCH"	3:20
7.	"Cypress"	6:14
8.	"Stress"	5:06

== Charts ==
Chart performance for Simulcast
Chart	Peak position
US Top Dance Albums (Billboard)	6
US Top Album Sales (Billboard)	41
US Independent Albums (Billboard)	46
