= Infinite Health =

Studio album by Tycho
- Released: August 30, 2024
- Genre: Electronic
- Length: 33:14
- Labels: Mom + Pop; Ninja Tune
- Producers: S. Hansen; Zac Brown; Chris Taylor

Tycho chronology
Simulcast (2020)	Infinite Health (2024)

Infinite Health is the seventh studio album by American musician Scott Hansen under the pseudonym Tycho. It was released on August 30, 2024, through Mom + Pop and Ninja Tune. It received generally favorable reviews from critics.

== Background ==
Infinite Health is Tycho's first studio album since Simulcast (2020). It is produced by Tycho with Zac Brown and Grizzly Bear's Chris Taylor. It includes performances by Brown, Rory O'Connor, and Cautious Clay.

== Critical reception ==
Professional ratings
Aggregate scores
Source	Rating
Metacritic	72/100
Review scores
Source	Rating
AllMusic	3.5/5 stars
Clash	7/10
Exclaim!	8/10
The Line of Best Fit	6/10

According to the review aggregator Metacritic, Infinite Health received "generally favorable reviews" based on a weighted average score of 72 out of 100 from 4 critic scores.

Tom Morgan of Clash described the album as "a sharply-constructed and engrossing (if lightweight) exercise in sun-flecked, gentle electronica." He added, "The vibes are magical, the emotions are nourishing, without ever being too palpable, and the images it conjures make you see the world in a better light." Dylan Barnabe of Exclaim! commented that "The return to a more electronic-based production style is a welcome homecoming, allowing every pluck of the guitar and gentle synth stroke to speak for itself." Paul Simpson of AllMusic stated, "Containing some of Tycho's most uptempo material, Infinite Health focuses on rhythm, paying special attention to breakbeat-like choppy drums."

== Track listing ==
All tracks are written by S. Hansen, except "Consciousness Felt", "Phantom", and "Totem" by Hansen and Zac Brown.

Infinite Health track listing
No.	Title	Length
1.	"Consciousness Felt"	3:14
2.	"Phantom"	4:41
3.	"Restraint"	3:05
4.	"Devices"	5:10
5.	"Infinite Health"	3:41
6.	"Green"	4:28
7.	"DX Odyssey"	3:18
8.	"Totem"	3:43
9.	"Epilogue"	1:54
Total length:		33:14

== Personnel ==
Credits adapted from liner notes.

- S. Hansen – production, recording, design, layout
- Zac Brown – guitar (1, 2, 4, 8), co-production
- Rory O'Connor – live drums (4)
- Cautious Clay – vocals (5)
- Chris Taylor – co-production, mixing
- Harry Cox – mixing (1, 8)
- Joe LaPorta – mastering
- Fran Rodriguez – cover image

== Charts ==
Chart performance for Infinite Health
Chart (2024)	Peak position
UK Album Downloads (Official Charts)	27
UK Independent Albums (Official Charts)	36
US Top Dance Albums (Billboard)	12
