= Tycho (musician) =

American musician (born 1977)

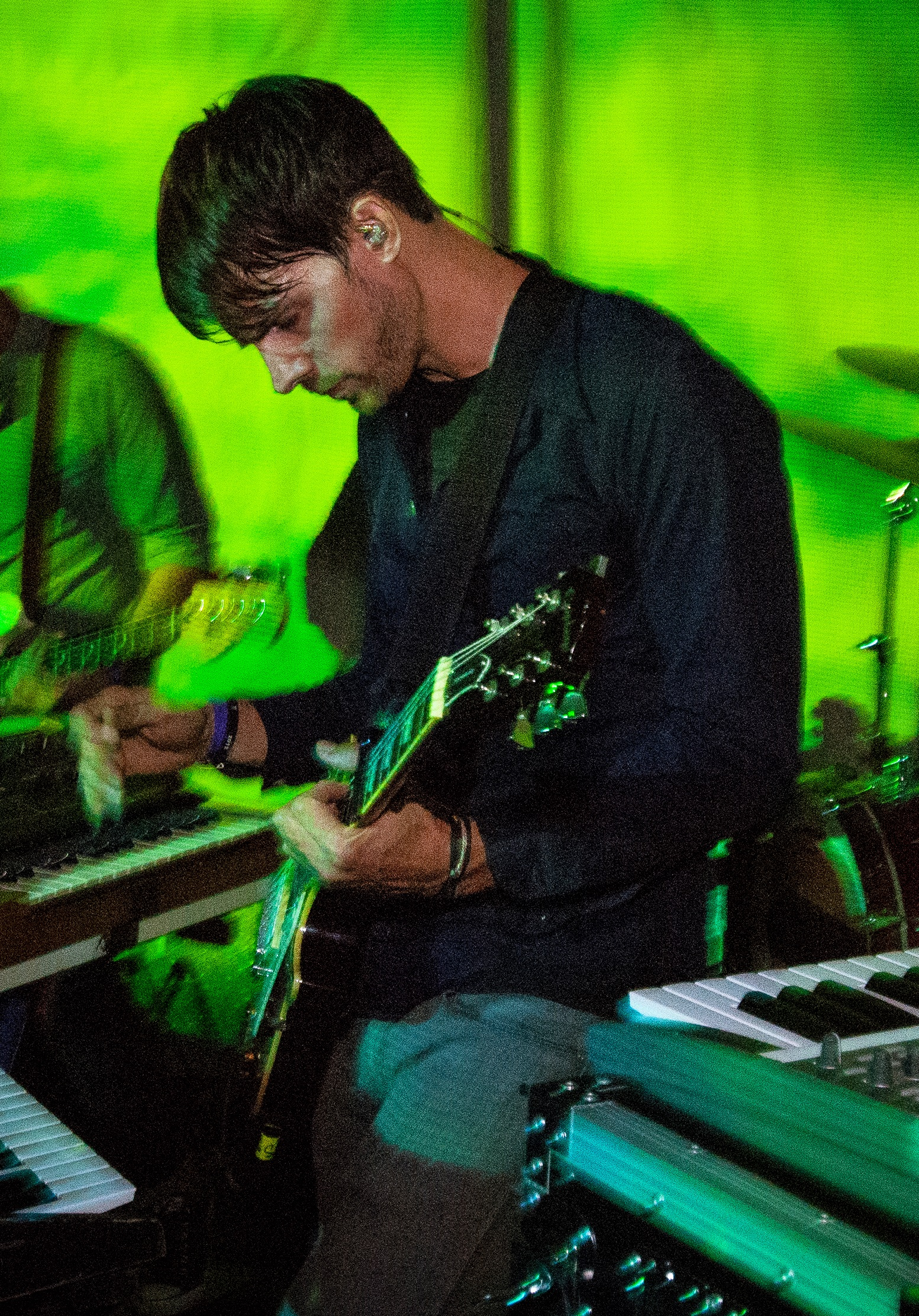
- Hansen performing in 2012

Background information
- Also known as: ISO50
- Born: Scott Hansen; February 7, 1977 (age 49)
- Origin: Sacramento, California, United States
- Genres: Chillwave; ambient; IDM; downtempo; post-rock
- Years active: 2002–present
- Labels: Mom + Pop; Ninja Tune; Ghostly International; Merck; Gammaphone
- Website: tychomusic.com

Scott Hansen (born February 7, 1977) is an American musician, record producer, composer, and songwriter. He is known professionally as Tycho (/ˈtaɪkoʊ/ TY-koh) and as ISO50 for his photographic and design work. His music incorporates elements of downtempo, ambient, and electronic styles, often featuring analogue synthesizers and guitar. He is based in San Francisco.

The name Tycho is inspired by the Danish astronomer Tycho Brahe.

== Musical career ==
Tycho released his first EP, The Science of Patterns, in 2002. His full-length debut, Sunrise Projector, followed in 2004 on Gammaphone Records. The album Past Is Prologue was released as a solo project.

In 2016, Tycho released his fourth studio album, Epoch, which was nominated for Best Dance/Electronic Album at the 2017 Grammy Awards. In 2019, Tycho signed with Mom+Pop and Ninja Tune. He has also released music on Ghostly International, Merck Records, and Gammaphone Records.

At the 2020 Grammy Awards, Tycho received a Grammy nomination for Best Dance/Electronic Album for his fifth studio album, Weather. In February 2020, Tycho released an instrumental version, Simulcast. He then released Infinite Health in 2024.

== Artistry ==
Hansen's music project, Tycho, has drawn comparisons to artists such as DJ Shadow, Ulrich Schnauss, and Boards of Canada. His style incorporates lo-fi analogue textures with electronic instrumentation, often featuring themes of nostalgia and nature. His compositions often feature ambient textures and layered synthesizers.

Until the release of the album Dive in 2011, Hansen worked as a solo artist, using the Digital Audio Workstation Cakewalk Sonar with virtual analogue and digital hardware, VSTi synthesizers, and samples of live instrumentation recorded by Hansen. While creating the album, he switched to REAPER, a program he credited for enabling him to finish Dive. The tour for the album featured a live band for the first time. Hansen's live performances often involve the concurrent use of guitar and foot-triggered samples. After touring, Hansen expanded the project to include collaborations in live and studio settings and added two other band members: Zac Brown on bass guitar and guitar, and Rory O'Connor on drums. As of 2024, the live band consists of Hansen (synthesizers, guitar), Brown (guitars), O'Connor (drums), and Billy Kim (bass, additional instrumentation).

== Band members ==
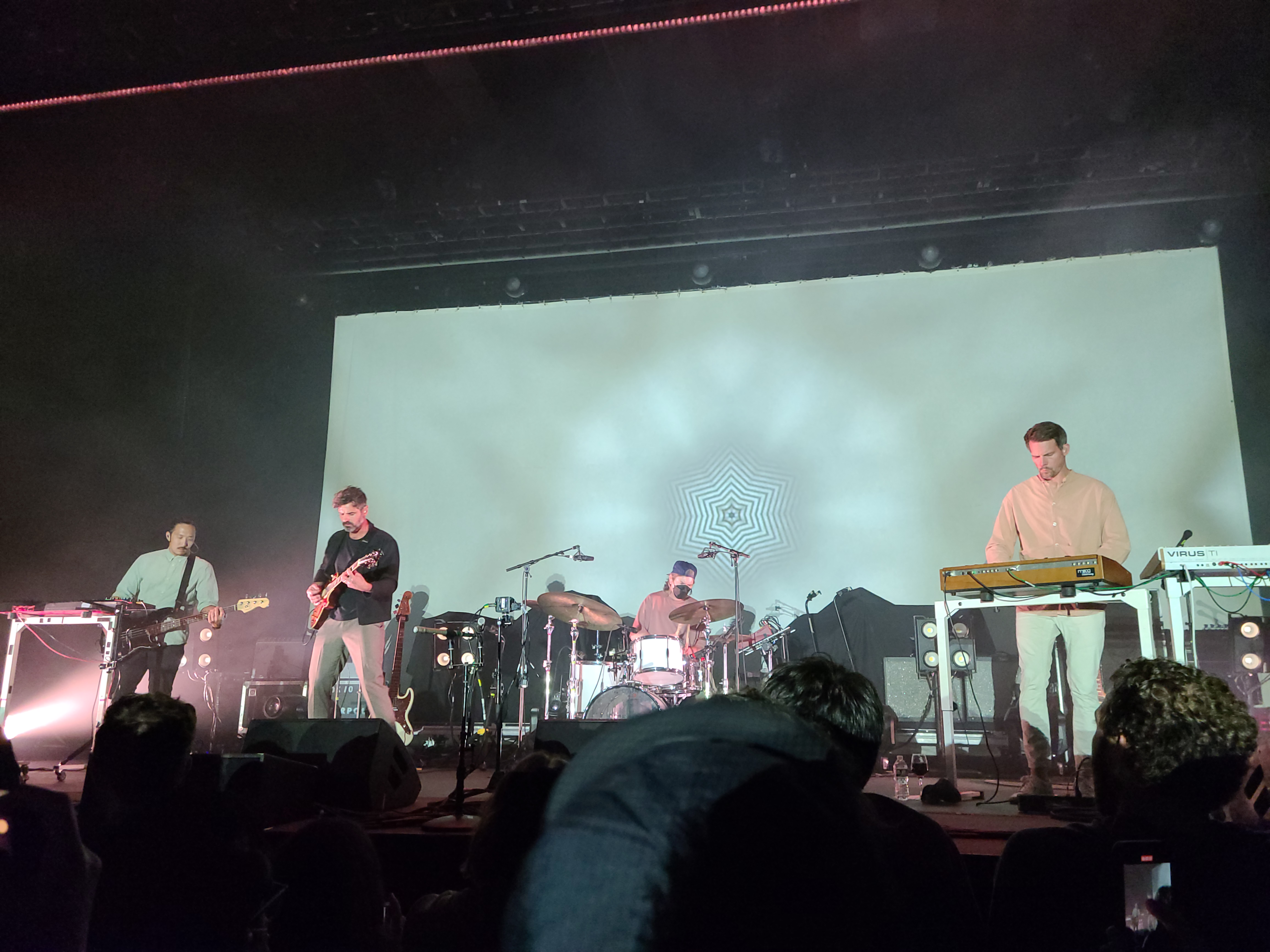
Tycho performing at the Roadrunner in Boston, Massachusetts, in 2022

- Scott Hansen – synthesizers, guitar, bass guitar, visuals, programming
- Zac Brown – bass guitar, guitar
- Rory O'Connor – drums, percussion
- Billy Kim (touring member) – bass guitar, keyboards, synthesizers, visuals
- Hannah Cottrell – vocals

Past members

- Joe Davancens (touring member) – bass guitar, keyboards, synthesizers, programming

== Discography ==
Studio albums

- Past Is Prologue (2006)
- Dive (2011)
- Awake (2014)
- Epoch (2016)
- Weather (2019)
- Simulcast (2020)
- Infinite Health (2024)
