= Awake (Tycho album) =

Album by Tycho

Studio album by Tycho
- Released: March 18, 2014
- Genres: Electronic; ambient; post-rock
- Length: 36:44
- Label: Ghostly International
- Producer: Scott Hansen

Tycho chronology
Dive (2011)	Awake (2014)	Epoch (2016)

Professional ratings
Aggregate scores
Source	Rating
Metacritic	69/100
Review scores
Source	Rating
AllMusic	3.5/5 stars
Consequence of Sound	B−
Drowned in Sound	7/10
musicOMH	3.5/5 stars
NME	6/10
Paste	7.3/10
Pitchfork	7.0/10
PopMatters	4/10
Sputnikmusic	3.5/5

Awake is the third studio album by the American ambient music project Tycho, released on March 18, 2014, by Ghostly International. It is the second album in a 'trilogy' by the project, beginning with Dive in 2011 and concluding with Epoch in 2016. To date it is his highest-charting album in the United States peaking at 23.

== Critical reception ==
At Metacritic, which assigns a normalized rating out of 100 to reviews from critics, the album received an average score of 69, based on 23 reviews, which indicates "generally favorable reviews".

== Track listing ==
All tracks are written by Scott Hansen.

No.	Title	Length
1.	"Awake"	4:43
2.	"Montana"	5:26
3.	"L"	4:37
4.	"Dye"	5:17
5.	"See"	5:18
6.	"Apogee"	4:20
7.	"Spectre"	3:46
8.	"Plains"	3:17
Total length:		36:44

Japanese edition bonus track
No.	Title	Length
9.	"Awake" (Ametsub Remix)	4:33
Total length:		41:17

== Personnel ==
Credits adapted from the liner notes of Awake.

- Scott Hansen – artwork, producer, bass, drums, guitar, keyboards, live drums engineering, mastering, mixing
- Zac Brown – bass, guitar
- Rory O'Connor – live drums, live drums engineering
- Count – live drums engineering, mastering, mixing, production consultant
- Christopher Willits – mastering, production consultant
- Ricardo Ayala – live drums, assistant engineering

== Charts ==
=== Weekly charts ===
Chart (2014)	Peak position
Belgian Albums Chart (Flanders)	104
Belgian Albums Chart (Wallonia)	143
UK Albums Chart	159
UK Indie Albums Chart	24
US Billboard 200	23
US Dance/Electronic Albums	2
US Independent Albums	3

=== Year-end charts ===
Chart (2014)	Position
US Dance/Electronic Albums	18

== Awake Remixes ==
Awake Remixes

Remix album by Tycho
- Released: January 15, 2016
- Genres: Ambient; post-rock
- Label: Ghostly International
- Producer: Scott Hansen

Tycho chronology
Awake (2014)	Awake Remixes (2016)

As of September 2016 the album has sold over 70,000 copies.

In December 2015 the group announced the release of a remix album of Awake, which was released digitally on 15 January and physically in May, 2016 on Ghostly International.

=== Track listing ===
No.	Title	Length
1.	"Awake" (Com Truise Remix)	5:05
2.	"Montana" (Christopher Willits Remix)	8:05
3.	"L" (Dusty Brown Remix)	4:24
4.	"Dye" (Nitemoves Remix)	5:32
5.	"See" (Beacon Remix)	3:54
6.	"Apogee" (RJD2 Remix)	4:40
7.	"Spectre" (Bibio Remix)	4:18
8.	"Plains" (Baio Remix)	4:36
9.	"Montana" (Few Nolder Remix)	3:17

=== Charts ===
==== Weekly charts ====
Chart (2014)	Peak position
US Dance/Electronic Albums	3
US Independent Albums	42
