= Merck Records =

American electronic music record label

Merck Records (2000–2007) was a record label based in Miami and run by Gabe Koch. It released electronic music.

== Background ==
Their releases cover a wide range of styles, from cut up vocal hip hop by their most prominent artist Machinedrum, to central IDM by artists like Proem, Mr. Projectile, and Deru, to indie-influenced electronic music like Tiki Obmar or Lateduster. They also release a wide geographical range of artists, from all over Europe and the US, as well as Australia, Russia and Japan. Also Merck is somewhat known for only putting forth minimal artist images, and not promoting the label in the traditional music industry push style.

Merck had produced 51 CD releases and 50 vinyl records by February 2007, at which point it ceased releasing new material.

A sublabel, Narita Records, has been set up by Merck to put out more dancefloor-oriented music.

== Artists ==
=== Merck Records ===
- 40 Winks
- Adam Johnson
- Anders Ilar
- Aphilas
- Blamstrain
- Deceptikon
- Deru
- Esem
- Frank & Bill
- Helios
- Ilkae
- Kettel
- Kristuit Salu vs. Morris Nightingale (aka Jimmy Edgar)
- Lackluster
- Landau
- Lateduster
- Machinedrum
- Malcom Kipe
- md
- Mr. Projectile
- Quench
- Proem
- Proswell
- Royal Foxbridge
- Secede
- Semiomime
- Sense
- Syndrone
- Tiki Obmar
- Tim Koch
- Temp Sound Solutions
- Tycho

=== Narita Records ===
- Anders Ilar
- Arctic Hospital
- Benjamin May
- Blamstrain
- Brothomstates
- Yard

== See also ==
- List of record labels
- List of electronic music record labels
- Electronica
- Intelligent dance music
- Techno
