= Brothomstates =

Finnish composer and musician

Brothomstates is one of the stage names of Lassi Nikko, a Finnish composer and musician. He also used to produce music in the demoscene under the moniker of Dune in the demogroup Orange. His works are mostly downtempo or ambient, but he is also known for his complex and abstract melodies and unique sounding drum programming. His 1998 debut album kobn-tich-ey was amongst the first mp3-only LPs released.

== In the media ==
The track "Adozenaday" from the Qtio single featured on a TV advertising campaign in the UK by the soft drinks manufacturer Sprite.

== Discography ==
=== Albums ===
- Kobn-Tich-Ey (self-published MP3 release, 1998, rereleased and remastered in 2020 as ReKobn-Tich-Ey)
- Claro (Warp, 2001)

=== EPs ===
- Untitled (Misc, 2017)
- Qtio (Warp, 2001)
- Brothom States EP (Exogenic, 2000)

=== Singles ===
- Rktic (Arcola, 2004)
- Brothomstrain vs Blamstates (Narita, 2006)

== See also ==
- Merck Records
- Demoscene
