= What's past is prologue =

Quotation from The Tempest

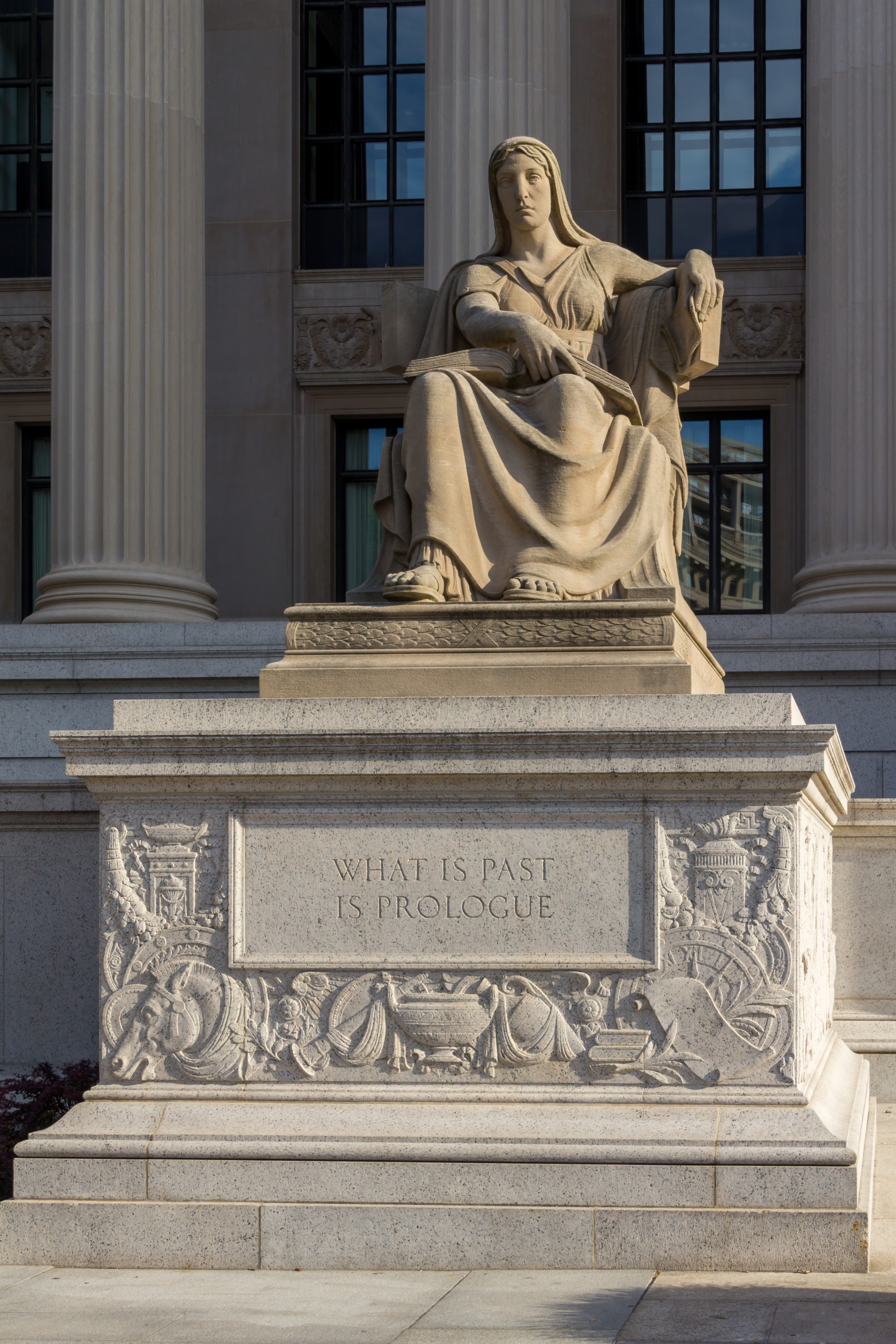
"What is past is prologue", inscribed on Present (1935, Robert Aitken) located on the northeast corner of the National Archives Building in Washington, DC

"What's past is prologue" is a quotation of William Shakespeare from his play The Tempest. In contemporary use, the phrase stands for the idea that history sets the context for the present. The quotation is engraved on the National Archives Building in Washington, DC, and is commonly used by the military when discussing the similarities between war throughout history.

== Historical meaning ==
The phrase was originally used in The Tempest, Act 2, Scene I. Antonio uses it to suggest that all that has happened before that time, the "past," has led Sebastian and him to this opportunity to do what they are about to do: commit murder. In the context of the preceding and next lines, "(And by that destiny) to perform an act, Whereof what's past is prologue; what to come, In yours and my discharge," Antonio is in essence rationalising to Sebastian and the audience that he and Sebastian are fated to act by all that has led up to that moment, the past has set the stage for their next act, as a prologue does in a play. It can also be taken to mean that everything up until now has merely set the stage for Antonio and Sebastian to make their own destinies.

== See also ==
- List of idioms attributed to Shakespeare
