= Dive (Tycho album) =

Studio album by Tycho
- Released: November 8, 2011
- Recorded: 2006–2011
- Genre: Chillwave; indie electronic; downtempo; post-rock
- Length: 50:37
- Label: Ghostly International
- Producer: Scott Hansen

Tycho chronology
Past Is Prologue (2006)	Dive (2011)	Awake (2014)

Dive is the second studio album by American electronic musician Scott Hansen's project Tycho, released on November 8, 2011, by the label Ghostly International. Taking around five years to produce and write, it was released to mostly positive reviews from critics, and it landed on Billboard's United States Top Dance/Electronic Albums and Top Heatseekers Albums charts.

Dive continues what Drowned in Sound described as a consistent style and sound palette from past Tycho albums, and was also made with mostly hardware and analog equipment. The sound of the album was also considered more "dynamic", "multidimensional" and "livelier" than past Tycho records by reviewers.

== Writing and influences ==
Hansen began writing most of the songs on an acoustic guitar, with many the album's tracks featuring guitars. He said that when he played a guitar, he often "ma[d]e more mistakes, and that characterize[d] my process more than anything, experimentation and mistakes. And that's what is interesting because, in that way, the songs kind of create themselves and you're there more to witness it." The only track on Dive that Hansen started making with digital equipment was the title track; he began making the song on a software synthesizer before adding other analog instruments. The first song written for Dive was "Adrift", the last being "Elegy".

Hansen explained that each song was developed in "little bits of inspiration", and that "taking that idea to what I consider to be a finished product is a very, very long, winding road of meticulously going over every detail." In making each track, he first created a 16-bar melody and bass line to set its mood, before working on other sounds. For making the drums, he started with making a loop to "give [himself] an idea or a grid." The last objective he completed in producing each song was editing and arranging the drum and percussion sounds. Hansen switched from Cakewalk Sonar to REAPER for digital audio workstation-based arranging and mixing during the production of Dive. The LP was the first Tycho record to be made with outboard gear such as pre-amps, analog delay devices, and digital reverb software, as well as using microphone-recorded acoustic instrumentation. The final album, according to Hansen, was a set of "artifacts from a future which might have more in common with our past than our present"; he described it as the "full picture" of what he was trying to make with Past Is Prologue.

Hansen was influenced by the works of DJ Shadow to have all of the tracks contain multiple ideas, where the listener goes on a "journey through [...] different places." As Hansen said, "I like to look at my songs as having a main part, an interlude, and almost like another song at the end." Listening to progressive rock influenced Hansen to create an album "pretty informed by stepping outside the boundaries of normal experience, or your daily life, and just trying to get to another kind of space." He also clarified that he "didn't want to go all the way into that world of, like, 'Hey, man, when you're high this sounds really good.' I try to avoid self-indulgence at all costs."

== Production ==
Dive took approximately five years to complete. As with previous Tycho records, Dive was made mostly with hardware production devices and analog sound generators; in fact, many of the sounds that appear on the album were produced on a Minimoog. The only time digital software was used was for arranging the songs and adding EQ and compression to the instrument recordings, which was all done in the digital audio workstation REAPER.

There were many differences in how Dive was produced in comparison to Tycho's previous albums. Around a year before Hansen completed the album, he switched the digital workstation he was using from Cakewalk Sonar to REAPER. He reasoned that "Cakewalk just wasn't working anymore for [his] flow" and that Reaper "allowed [him] to look at it as a multi-track tape player. But [he didn't] have to pull out the tape and the razor blades to do the editing." Hansen explained, "I was just struggling to get this album off the ground and the second I jumped in [Reaper] it was done." Dive was the first Tycho album where Hansen recorded acoustic instruments with microphones, thus it features many more guitar and electric bass parts than past Tycho records. It was also the first Tycho record to be made with outboard gear such as pre-amps, analog delay devices, and old digital reverb software.

== Composition ==
Dive has been described as featuring IDM, balearic and electronica elements throughout. According to Reyan Ali, it uses the "sleek and economical construction" of post-punk synthesizers that have the same "imaginative color" as shoegaze guitars, along with post-rock-esque crescendos and build; elements of space music are also present. George Bass, a reviewer for Drowned in Sound, analyzed that Dive maintains the same formula of "radar loops and Massive Attack beats" as Sunrise Projector. The LP mainly consists of a sound palette of female humming, what Derek Miller of Resident Advisor described as "pulsing" synthesizers, what Ali described as "spacey" blips, subtle acoustic guitar, ocean foley, and what Miller called "sparkling" drum machines. Miller described Dive as "sun-blanched, caked in reverb and semi-hallucinatory fuzz, and kind of wavy at the point where visual lines intersect." Critic Loren Auda Poin analyzed that the synthesizer sounds "border on vagueness, barely holding their jelly-like shape as they coalesce atop relaxed but driving beats."

In numerous reviews, Dive's sound and style was compared to the works of Scottish electronic duo Boards of Canada. Allmusic's Jason Lymangrover was one of these critics, writing that it uses the same format of "liquid keyboards drizzled over gentle beats" as the works of Boards of Canada and Ulrich Schnauss. He also grouped the album with other electronica artists such as M83 and Neon Indian and Small Black. Eric Harvey of Spin magazine more specifically compared Dive to Boards of Canada's Geogaddi album. Bass described the album's sound as consisting of "pink sunsets, shuffling hipsters and old video hardware." Some critics have also made direct comparisons of Dive to the works of chillwave artists such as Toro Y Moi and Washed Out. Ali compared Dive to The Earth Is Not a Cold Dead Place (2003), an album by Explosions in the Sky, due to "its many gorgeous hues," as well as its musical style to the works of Air.

Joe Colly of Pitchfork compared Dive to Boards of Canada and Bibio in terms of its "electro-organic" sound structure of synthesizers and live instruments. He wrote that what differentiates Dive from the works of other independent artists that use "electro-organic" arrangements is the "simple" and "OCD-level" way each track is crafted and built up. As Colly wrote, "In place of the tinny, synthetic beats favored by lots of indie-ambient startups, Hansen takes extra care to capture real live drum sounds with a crack and thump that makes you feel like you're in the room with them." Colly used "Daydream" as an example of Hansen's attention to detail in terms of song building. As he wrote, it "starts out fairly simple with twinkly guitars and a sturdy, knocking beat, but the song's pulse quickens as it progresses, and by the end you've got something heady enough to live up to its title."

Mike Stagno of Sputnikmusic analyzed a musical difference of Dive from past Tycho releases that gives the LP a more "dynamic" sound: elements of folk music serving as the "foundation" of most of its tracks, where "swirling melodies give way to acoustic guitars." Stagno also noted that Dive has a "livelier, more carefree atmosphere" than the "nostalgic, sometimes contemplative motif[s]" of Hansen's previous albums of the project. This is most showcased on the album's eight-minute title-track, where, as Stagno wrote, "driving beats help keep everything focused as Hansen lays down lush soundscapes that help maintain an infectious mood that is as dreamy as it is energetic." Erik Burg of Beats Per Minute noted Dive's "transmorphic sound:" "He can shift from a barrage of keyboards, synthesizers, and drum machines to an acoustic guitar at the drop of a hat, all while sounding completely cohesive on both a track and album level." He described the album as an "essential device for sparking imagination," writing that it has "a spirit and liveliness which is translated through the listener on their own terms."

Kyle Lemmon, a critic for Prefix magazine, described Dive as a post-modern album and a record "ensconced in the musty past of outdated appliances and ideas." He analyzed that the LP is a set of "nature-inspired" tracks where "the seemingly commonplace nature all around us" is "as foreign and transfixing as E.T." He also described the album as more "aquatic and climate-altering" than past Tycho albums.

== Artwork ==
The artwork of Dive depicts a multihued sun that, as Patric Fallon writes, "practically melt[s] into a large swath of barren earth." Even though Hansen, who created the artwork, left it vague as to whether or not the cover art is trying to depict a sun rising or setting, he stated that the cover art represented a sunset to him: "It's kind of like the epilogue to a chapter in my life as an artist and a person. This last year has been really transformative in a lot of ways, personally, so this album is kind of a punctuation on the end of a really intense period [of my life]. The end of a part of me."

== Release and promotion ==
On November 7, 2011, the website Electronic Beats made Dive available for streaming as part of their EB Listening Party series. On November 17, 2011, Rolling Stone released a free download of Dive's title track.

Combined sales of Dive and Awake stand at 200,000 copies sold worldwide.

== Reception ==
Professional ratings
Aggregate scores
Source	Rating
AnyDecentMusic?	7.4/10
Metacritic	80/100
Review scores
Source	Rating
AllMusic	3.5/5 stars
Beats Per Minute	80%
The Boston Phoenix	3.5/5 stars
Drowned in Sound	8/10
Filter	83%
Pitchfork	7.0/10
PopMatters	8/10
Resident Advisor	3.5/5
Spin	6/10
Sputnikmusic	4/5

Burg called Dive "undeniably important" due to its "ability to tell a story without words" and "to capture a scene and a raw emotion with just sound, a task that more than a few band bands try, and usually fail, at accomplishing." He wrote, "if you're willing to put in the three quarters of an hour that it takes to finish the album, and you're able to free your mind of any foregone conclusions or suppositions you have, Dive could easily be your favorite record this year." However, he also wrote that the album is "underwhelm[ing] in certain situations." Miller wrote that Dive "rewards patience," writing that "its soft focus remove repays repeat listens, not "ambient" per se but atmospheric, alternating moments of presence with necessary spaceouts."

Both Stagno and Lymangrover called Dive more "multidimensional" than Tycho's previous albums. Lymangrover reasoned that it was due to its use of more acoustic instruments than past releases of the project. Stagno stated that while the album "lacks a certain flair" of previous Tycho records, it was still "the kind of high quality release one expects from Hansen." He also wrote, "Drawing on a variety of different sounds and structures, Tycho is able to craft a number of immersive tracks." In a review for BBC Music, Wyndham Wallace opined that Dive "meets expectations, and while surpassing them is something achieved only occasionally, this is a record that well complements a no-work state of mind."

In a less positive review, Joe Colly of Pitchfork criticized the album's lack of surprise, writing "If that nicely detailed tranquility is Dive's biggest selling point, it also exposes a nagging flaw, which is a lack of tension. Hansen is so committed to keeping things serene that he doesn't incorporate much danger or risk, and at times the album can feel a bit one-note." Poin similarly criticized the LP for the fact that the tracks "seem to stroke and soothe the mind's imaginative engine, rather than exciting it." While he did enjoy Dive, calling it a "beautiful album with an amniotic vibe," he also wrote that it was "a bit repetitive," writing that "each of Dive’s songs gel into one atmosphere rather than branching into the semi-organic variety of the best records." He felt that Dive did not do what electronic music instrumental records should, which is "shift into gears we didn't even know existed, so we marvel at the counterintuitive beauty of the machine." Harvey described Dive as "a pretty and sturdily crafted collection of techno maybe-memories."

Bass called Dive "irresistibly good," writing that for a 66-minute-long album, "Hansen's clever enough to add spice where it's needed, edging his sluggish beats away from New Age and into something more engaging." A negative of the LP mentioned his review for Drowned in Sound was that "large portions of it overlap." He reasoned that "a few tracks feel plain identical" to the point where they fit the definition of ambient music set by Brian Eno as “music interesting/bland enough to either analyse with headphones or put on in the background while ironing.” Lemmon wrote that with Dive, "Tycho makes damn sure to make his tracks move even when they seem like they're just stargazing." He also wrote that "there's little pretension wafting over his analog craft and the melodic tokens he unearths are as iridescent as an oceanic sunset."

PopMatters named Dive the third-best electronic album of 2011, writing: "[H]eavy processing and multicolored aural flourishes unwind here and for the duration, yielding playback that's refreshingly reluctant on returns."

== Track listing ==
No.	Title	Length
1.	"A Walk"	5:16
2.	"Hours"	5:44
3.	"Daydream"	5:34
4.	"Dive"	8:19
5.	"Coastal Brake"	5:34
6.	"Ascension"	4:24
7.	"Melanine"	2:53
8.	"Adrift"	6:02
9.	"Epigram"	2:28
10.	"Elegy"	4:23
Total length:		50:37

== Personnel ==
The following people contributed to Dive:

- Scott Hansen – artwork, bass, drums, guitar, keyboards, mastering, mixing
- Zac Brown – guitars, bass
- Dusty Brown – production consultant
- Count – mastering, mixing
- Matt McCord – production consultant, bass
- Jianda Johnson (a.k.a. "Jianda Monique") – vocals

== Charts ==
Chart (2011)	Peak position
US Top Dance Albums (Billboard)	22
US Heatseekers Albums (Billboard)	39
