= Whatever the Weather (album) =

Studio album by Whatever the Weather
- Released: 8 April 2022
- Genre: Electronic; ambient
- Length: 44:19
- Label: Ghostly International
- Producer: Loraine James

Loraine James chronology
| Reflection (2021) | Whatever the Weather (2022) | Building Something Beautiful for Me (2022) |

Whatever the Weather is a studio album by English music producer Loraine James under the pseudonym Whatever the Weather. It was released on 8 April 2022 through Ghostly International. It received universal acclaim from critics.

== Background ==
Under her own name, Loraine James released Detail (2017), For You and I (2019), and Reflection (2021). Whatever the Weather is her first studio album under the pseudonym Whatever the Weather.

Most tracks on Whatever the Weather are instrumental, while a few tracks feature Loraine James' own vocals. During the making of the album, she was influenced by the bands Deftones and American Football. Each song on the album is titled for a different temperature (measured in Celsius). The album is mastered by Joshua Eustis (Telefon Tel Aviv). A music video for "17°C" was directed by Michael Reisinger.

Loraine James later released a follow-up album, Whatever the Weather II (2025).

== Critical reception ==
Professional ratings
Aggregate scores
| Source | Rating |
|---|---|
| Metacritic | 83/100 |
Review scores
| Source | Rating |
| AllMusic | 4/5 stars |
| Clash | 8/10 |
| Mojo | 4/5 stars |
| Pitchfork | 7.8/10 |
| Uncut | 8/10 |

According to the review aggregator Metacritic, Whatever the Weather received "universal acclaim" based on a weighted average score of 83 out of 100 from 7 critic scores.

Paul Simpson of AllMusic stated, "It's not quite accurate to pigeonhole this as 'Loraine James goes ambient,' as she's still experimenting with complex beat structures on several of these tracks, but there's a far greater presence of rippling, weightless synths and placid piano melodies here." Will Ainsley of The Quietus called the album "an excellent, and at times thrilling, exposition of a particular side of James' music-making, a strange and alien concoction that reels you into its jellied depths."

Stephen Dalton of Uncut stated, "Loraine James adopts a new label, a meteorological alias and a more improvisational approach on this mostly delicious anthology of liquid dreamscapes and ambient-adjacent sound paintings." Stephen Worthy of Mojo commented that "Its tracks bloom or brood organically, changing tempo and energy in line with the temperatures they're named after."

=== Accolades ===
Year-end lists for Whatever the Weather
| Publication | List | Rank | Ref. |
|---|---|---|---|
| Impose | The Top 50 Albums of 2022 | — | |
| Slant Magazine | The Best Electronic Albums of 2022 | — | |

== Track listing ==
All tracks are written by Loraine James.

Whatever the Weather track listing
| No. | Title | Length |
|---|---|---|
| 1. | "25°C" | 7:27 |
| 2. | "0°C" | 4:01 |
| 3. | "17°C" | 4:02 |
| 4. | "14°C" | 5:45 |
| 5. | "2°C (Intermittent Rain)" | 1:32 |
| 6. | "10°C" | 4:22 |
| 7. | "6°C" | 2:24 |
| 8. | "4°C" | 4:36 |
| 9. | "30°C" | 4:50 |
| 10. | "36°C" | 5:20 |
| Total length: | | 44:19 |

Digital edition bonus track
| No. | Title | Length |
|---|---|---|
| 11. | "28°C (Intermittent Sunshine)" | 1:32 |
| Total length: | | 45:53 |

== Personnel ==
Credits adapted from liner notes.

- Loraine James – production, mixing
- Joshua Eustis – mastering
- Molly Smith – art direction
- Justin Hunt Sloane – design
- Collin Hughes – photography

== Charts ==
Chart performance for Whatever the Weather
| Chart (2022) | Peak position |
|---|---|
| UK Album Downloads (OCC) | 90 |
| UK Independent Album Breakers (OCC) | 19 |
