= Remixes Compiled =

Compilation album by Telefon Tel Aviv
- Released: April 30, 2007
- Genre: Electronic
- Length: 53:53
- Label: Hefty
- Producer: Charles Cooper; Joshua Eustis

Telefon Tel Aviv chronology
Map of What Is Effortless (2004)	Remixes Compiled (2007)	Immolate Yourself (2009)

Remixes Compiled is a compilation album of remixes done by Telefon Tel Aviv, an American electronic music duo consisting of Joshua Eustis and Charles Cooper. It was released on Hefty Records in 2007.

== Critical reception ==
Professional ratings
Review scores
Source	Rating
AllMusic	4/5 stars
Cyclic Defrost	unfavorable
Pitchfork	6.6/10

Marc Hogan of Pitchfork said, "Telefon Tel Aviv's remixes are all extensions of a common aesthetic, a fact that's particularly remarkable if you grew up with the idea of these comps as schizophrenic cash-ins full of your favorite rock group's DJ-tweaked B-sides."

== Track listing ==
No.	Title	Original artist(s)	Length
1.	"Even Deeper (Telefon Tel Aviv Remix)"	Nine Inch Nails	4:38
2.	"All Around (Telefon Tel Aviv Remix)"	Bebel Gilberto	4:31
3.	"Got Me Lost/Driving in LA (Telefon Tel Aviv Remix)"	John Hughes	3:17
4.	"Komponent (Telefon Tel Aviv Remix)"	Apparat	4:21
5.	"BBQ Plate ('Last Supper' Mix by Telefon Tel Aviv)"	Ammoncontact	5:17
6.	"Green Green Grass (Telefon Tel Aviv Remix)"	The American Analog Set	3:12
7.	"Genuine Display (Telefon Tel Aviv Remix)"	Midwest Product	3:33
8.	"Stolen Moments (Telefon Tel Aviv Remix)"	Oliver Nelson	5:31
9.	"Time Is Running Out (Telefon Tel Aviv Remix)"	Phil Ranelin	3:49
10.	"Fading Away (Telefon Tel Aviv Remix)"	Nitrada	3:55
11.	"Asleep on the Wing (Telefon Tel Aviv Remix)"	Marc Hellner	5:04
12.	"Knock Me Down Girl (Telefon Tel Aviv Remix)"	Slicker	6:45
Total length:			53:53
