= Detached from the Rest of You =

Studio album by Loraine James
- Released: May 8, 2026
- Genres: Electronic; IDM; glitch
- Length: 44:07
- Label: Hyperdub
- Producers: Loraine James; Miho Hatori (track 6)

Loraine James chronology
Gentle Confrontation (2023)	Detached from the Rest of You (2026)

Singles from Detached from the Rest of You
- 1. "In a Rut" Released: March 3, 2026; 2. "Flatline" Released: April 14, 2026

Detached from the Rest of You is the sixth studio album by the British electronic musician Loraine James. Hyperdub released it digitally on May 8, 2026, followed by compact disc and vinyl editions on May 22. James produced every track, with Miho Hatori co-producing "Flatline". It includes guest appearances from Hatori, Alan Sparhawk, Sydney Spann, Anysia Kym, Le3 Black, Fyn Dobson, and Tirzah.

James developed the album after experiencing self-doubt and a creative block following Gentle Confrontation (2023). Her work with Kym on the 2025 EP Clandestine influenced its more concise, song-oriented arrangements. James described the result, partly in jest, as her "IDM popstar album" and placed her singing more prominently in the mix than on her earlier records. The music combines electronic pop structures with clicks-and-cuts textures, glitch, IDM, ambient passages, and live percussion. Its lyrics and guest performances address isolation, insecurity, digital communication, and interpersonal disconnection.

The album received generally favorable reviews. Critics commonly praised its emotional candor, sound design, and integration of collaborators, although some considered its subdued palette less forceful than James's earlier work. It received a score of 78 out of 100 from Metacritic and appeared at number 37 on Paste's midyear list of the best albums of 2026.

== Background and recording ==
James's previous studio album under her own name, Gentle Confrontation, was released in 2023. She subsequently released Whatever the Weather II (2025) under her ambient alias Whatever the Weather and collaborated with musicians including Purelink, Kelela, and Yaeji. Discussing the period after Gentle Confrontation on the RA Exchange podcast, James described struggling with impostor syndrome, self-doubt, and creative blocks despite her pride in the earlier album. The idea of writing pop music offered her a way forward. She later said that the album's title came late in the process and reflected the alienation she felt while making a record she found particularly difficult to finish.

According to Hyperdub, producing the 2025 Clandestine EP with singer Anysia Kym familiarized James with a pop setting and helped her shape instrumentals into more conventional song forms. The label characterized the album as a turn away from both her club-oriented tracks and her more extended instrumentals. James jokingly called the result her "IDM popstar album", referring to her more prominent singing and use of tightly structured songs. She said that she develops albums intuitively, without deciding their themes or titles in advance. She determines their subjects after completing the music, a process she described as therapeutic.

James invited collaborators either through direct messages or in person and normally sent them instrumentals without prescribing lyrical themes. She said that working in the same room with Hatori and Kym could be preferable to exchanging files online. After a mutual friend introduced Hatori and James, James sent Hatori demos; Hatori visited London in 2025, and they spent a day writing together. Hatori initially tried several approaches to "Flatline" before settling on a slower melody and lyrics about artificial intelligence. James said the track's opening tones suggested a hospital monitor, inspiring its title, and that she and Hatori finished it together in the same room.

== Composition and themes ==
Detached from the Rest of You is an electronic album. AllMusic classified its styles as glitch, IDM, experimental electro, experimental club, and electronica. Hyperdub described the production as skeletal, emphasizing clicks, glitches, sparse keyboard chords, and space around the vocals. James cited Aoki Takamasa, Ryoji Ikeda, and early-2000s clicks-and-cuts music as influences. In a first-person essay published by Crack, she said that Aoki and Tujiko Noriko's 2005 collaborative album 28 directly influenced the record by demonstrating how clicks-and-cuts minimalism could work in pop music. Matthew Blackwell of Pitchfork likewise identified 28 as a model for combining pop vocals with austere IDM textures.

Reviewers regarded the record as more vocal-centered and conventionally structured than James's earlier albums without abandoning her experimental approach. Tom Morgan of Flood Magazine called it her most understated release under her own name, while Luke Cartledge of Paste described its shift toward pop as an extension of, rather than a break from, her background in experimental dance music. Marshall Gu of Bandcamp Daily heard elements of grime, glitch, deconstructed club, ambient music, pop, and R&B, held together by James's sound design. The album also incorporates live drums: Jason McGerr plays a rock-oriented beat on "Peak Again", and Fyn Dobson's percussion supports Le3 Black rap on "Ending Us All".

The album centers on alienation, self-doubt, and the difficulty of maintaining personal connections. Blackwell interpreted its glitch sounds as representations of relationships failing rather than machines failing: the opening track, "A Long Distance Call", depicts an intimate video call disrupted by a poor connection, and "The Book of Self Doubt" addresses comparison and insecurity. Patrick Gamble of the Skinny similarly viewed the album as a confrontation with impostor syndrome and linked its spare production to the psychological effects of online comparison.

The guest performances extend those themes. On "Flatline", Hatori's English- and Japanese-language lyrics question whether a lover is human or artificial intelligence; "Habits and Patterns" pairs Tirzah's meditation on emotional distance with piano and domestic field recordings. The latter review described "Peak Again" as an anti-war song and "Ending Us All" as a politically charged track about government control and survival. It interpreted the penultimate track, "Forever Still (Steel)", as addressing childhood trauma and emotional numbness before "See Through" closes the album without resolving its tensions. James said that "Ending Us All" and "Forever Still (Steel)" were among the first tracks she wrote; placing them near the end shifted the album toward a more inward-looking, largely solo conclusion.

== Release and promotion ==
James announced Detached from the Rest of You on March 3, 2026, identifying it as her first LP under her own name since Gentle Confrontation. The announcement was accompanied by the first single, "In a Rut", featuring Sydney Spann. "Flatline", featuring Hatori, followed on April 14.

Hyperdub released the album digitally on May 8, 2026; CD and vinyl editions followed on May 22. Bandcamp Daily selected it as its Album of the Day on May 13.

== Critical reception ==
Professional ratings
Aggregate scores
Source	Rating
Metacritic	78/100
Review scores
Source	Rating
Paste	B+
Pitchfork	7.6/10
The Skinny	4/5 stars

At Metacritic, which assigns a normalized rating out of 100 to reviews from professional publications, Detached from the Rest of You received an average score of 78 based on eight reviews, indicating "generally favorable reviews". Seven reviews were classified as positive and one as mixed. Reviewers broadly agreed that the album made James's music more intimate by pairing restrained arrangements with direct vocals. Blackwell praised James for bringing warmth to clicks-and-cuts production and making technological textures express interpersonal vulnerability. Mary Chiney of the Quietus likewise considered the complex rhythms emotionally open and found the collaborators integral without displacing James's perspective.

Several critics singled out James's handling of the guest performances. Ellen Peirson-Hagger of The Observer called the record enjoyably unpredictable and credited James with drawing distinct contributions from Tirzah, Sparhawk, Le3 Black, and Dobson. Gu argued that James's sound design unified the album's disparate genres and voices, while Cartledge called it her boldest and most immediate work despite its stylistic fluidity. Gamble wrote that collaboration helped turn James's insecurity into confidence, culminating in the solo closing track. Paul Clarke of DJ Mag emphasized the album's understated sound and emotional openness, which he connected to the expressive traditions of soul music.

Other reviews were more qualified. Writing for Flood Magazine, Morgan admired the album's refinement but suggested that omitting the harder club elements of James's previous work reduced some of its impact; he also found "Peak Again" too tonally abstract to deliver its intended emotional force. AllMusic's Paul Simpson thought the guest tracks were often the strongest because they added melodic and tonal contrast to James's stark arrangements. Mojo said that the experiments did not consistently succeed but highlighted the glitch-hop and Sparhawk feature on "Peak Again" as evidence of James's ambition.

=== Accolades ===
Paste placed Detached from the Rest of You at number 37 on its list of the 50 best albums of the first half of 2026.

== Track listing ==
Track titles and durations are adapted from Bandcamp and Qobuz.

No.	Title	Length
1.	"A Long Distance Call"	3:31
2.	"The Book of Self Doubt"	3:36
3.	"In a Rut" (featuring Sydney Spann)	4:17
4.	"Score" (featuring Anysia Kym)	3:41
5.	"Seems Like I"	1:29
6.	"Flatline" (featuring Miho Hatori)	3:12
7.	"Peak Again" (featuring Alan Sparhawk)	4:27
8.	"Habits and Patterns" (featuring Tirzah)	4:37
9.	"Wish I Was Like U"	1:10
10.	"Ending Us All" (featuring Le3 Black and Fyn Dobson)	3:28
11.	"Forever Still (Steel)"	7:06
12.	"See Through"	3:33
Total length:		44:07

== Personnel ==
Credits are adapted from Bandcamp, Qobuz, and Apple Music.

- Loraine James – production, composition, mixing, vocals
- Sydney Spann – vocals (track 3)
- Anysia Kym – vocals, lyrics (track 4)
- Mélodie Blaison – flute (track 4)
- Miho Hatori – vocals, co-production, lyrics (track 6)
- Alan Sparhawk – vocals (track 7)
- Jason McGerr – drums (track 7)
- Tirzah – vocals, lyrics (track 8)
- Le3 Black – vocals, lyrics (track 10)
- Fyn Dobson – drums, percussion, composition (track 10)
- Joshua Eustis – mastering
