= Different Days (L'Altra album) =

Studio album by L'Altra
- Released: January 25, 2005
- Genres: Electronic; dream pop
- Length: 42:46
- Label: Hefty Records
- Producers: Joseph Costa; Lindsay Anderson; Joshua Eustis

L'Altra chronology
In the Afternoon (2002)	Different Days (2005)	Telepathic (2010)

Singles from Different Days
- 1. "Bring on Happiness" Released: 2004

Different Days is a studio album by American duo L'Altra. It was released on Hefty Records on January 25, 2005.

== Critical reception ==
Professional ratings
Aggregate scores
Source	Rating
Metacritic	71/100
Review scores
Source	Rating
AllMusic	4/5 stars
Billboard	favorable
Pitchfork	7.6/10
Stylus Magazine	B+

At Metacritic, which assigns a weighted average score out of 100 to reviews from mainstream critics, the album received an average score of 71, based on 14 reviews, indicating "generally favorable reviews".

Rob Theakston of AllMusic gave the album 4 stars out of 5, calling it "an album that skillfully balances and blurs the line between electronic music and a nostalgic longing for a whispy dream pop revival." He added, "The themes of isolation, solitude and general soul-crushing existence make it their most blatantly honest work and help further reinforce the notion that this is their most fully realized and beautiful release to date." Sam Url of Pitchfork gave the album a 7.6 out of 10, saying, "Different Days is notable for its consistency; a collection of primarily lovelorn ballads, each song flickers with detail while retaining many common characteristics."

== Track listing ==
All tracks are written by Joseph Costa and Lindsay Anderson.

No.	Title	Length
1.	"Sleepless Night"	5:38
2.	"It Follows Me Around"	4:26
3.	"Better Than Bleeding"	4:44
4.	"Bring on Happiness"	2:31
5.	"So Surprise"	4:21
6.	"Mailbomb"	4:47
7.	"There Is No"	3:52
8.	"Different Days"	3:21
9.	"Morning Disaster"	5:33
10.	"A Day Between"	3:33
Total length:		42:46

== Personnel ==
Credits adapted from liner notes.

L'Altra

- Joseph Costa – vocals, choir, production, acoustic guitar, electric guitar, steel guitar, bass guitar, Wurlitzer piano, handclaps, programming
- Lindsay Anderson – vocals, choir, production, electric guitar, bass guitar, piano, organ, Wurlitzer piano, Rhodes piano, Moog synthesizer, melodica, flute

Additional personnel

- Joshua Eustis – music, production, choir, acoustic guitar, electric guitar, slide guitar, bass guitar, Wurlitzer piano, mellotron, glockenspiel, wooden flute, handclaps, tambourine, shaker, programming, recording, additional piano recording, mixing
- Frederick Lonberg-Holm – choir, cello, trumpet
- Brian Harding – clarinet, bass clarinet
- Nate Walcott – trumpet, flugelhorn
- Marc Hellner – choir, guitar, programming
- Eben English – bass guitar, drums, tambourine, shaker
- Charles Cooper – handclaps, programming
- Sana Kinaya – handclaps
- Kevin Duneman – drums
- Jason Ward – additional drum recording
- Roger Seibel – mastering
- Sockho – design
- Jesse Chehak – photography
