= L'Altra =

American band

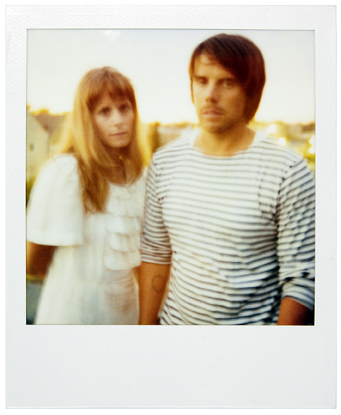
- L'Altra

Background information
- Origin: Chicago, Illinois, U.S.
- Genres: Post-rock; indie rock; indie electronic
- Years active: 1999–present
- Labels: Aesthetics, Saint Marie Records, Acuarela Discos, And Records (Japan),
- Members: Lindsay Anderson (vocals, keyboards); Joseph Desler Costa (vocals, guitars)
- Website: laltramusic.com

L'Altra is an American band from Chicago, Illinois, consisting of principle songwriters Joseph Desler Costa and Lindsay Anderson with a rotating cast of players including drummers Charles Rumback and Alessandro Baris.

== History ==
L'Altra formed in 1999 in Chicago with original members Ken Dyber, Eben English, Lindsay Anderson, and Joseph Desler Costa. Marc Hellner of Pulseprogramming was also a regular contributor. The band's name is Italian or Català and means "the [feminine] other" or "other woman.". The band released an EP and two records with Aesthetics Records before English and Dyber left the band. The band continued with Costa and Anderson as a songwriting duo and relying on a loose collective of Chicago based musicians and friends. Their 2002 release In the Afternoon featured a guest appearance from avant-cellist Fred Lonberg-Holm. The band continued to tour with members Kevin Duneman and W.W. Lowman, taking the place of the departed rhythm section.

In 2005 L'Altra moved to Hefty Records and teamed up with Telefon Tel Aviv's Joshua Eustis who produced and recorded the band's album Different Days. Lindsay Anderson later released a solo album called If (Minty Fresh) while Joseph Costa released a solo effort Lighter Subjects-Costa Music (Stilll) in 2008. In 2008, after a few years hiatus, Lindsay and Joseph began touring again and started to work on new material. The band signed with longtime friend Jesus Llorente's Madrid based label, Acuarela Discos, in 2010 and subsequently released their 4th studio album, Telepathic, in March 2011. In 2012 the band signed to Saint Marie Records and plans to release a deluxe edition of Telepathic in spring 2012.

== Discography ==
Albums

- S/T EP (Aesthetics), 1999.
- Music of a Sinking Occasion (Aesthetics), 2000.
- In The Afternoon (Aesthetics), 2002.
- Ouletta 7" (Aesthetics), 2002.
- Different Days (Hefty Records), 2005.
- Bring On Happiness EP (Hefty Records), 2005.
- Lindsay Anderson 'If' (Lindsay solo) (Minty Fresh), 2007.
- Costa Music 'Lighter Subjects' (Joseph solo) (Stilll, IsCollageCollective), 2008
- Winter Loves Summer Sun, Single (Crooked House), 2010
- Telepathic (Acuarela Records), 2011
- Deluxe Edition'Telepathic (Saint Marie Records Records), 2012
