= Loraine James =

British electronic producer and musician

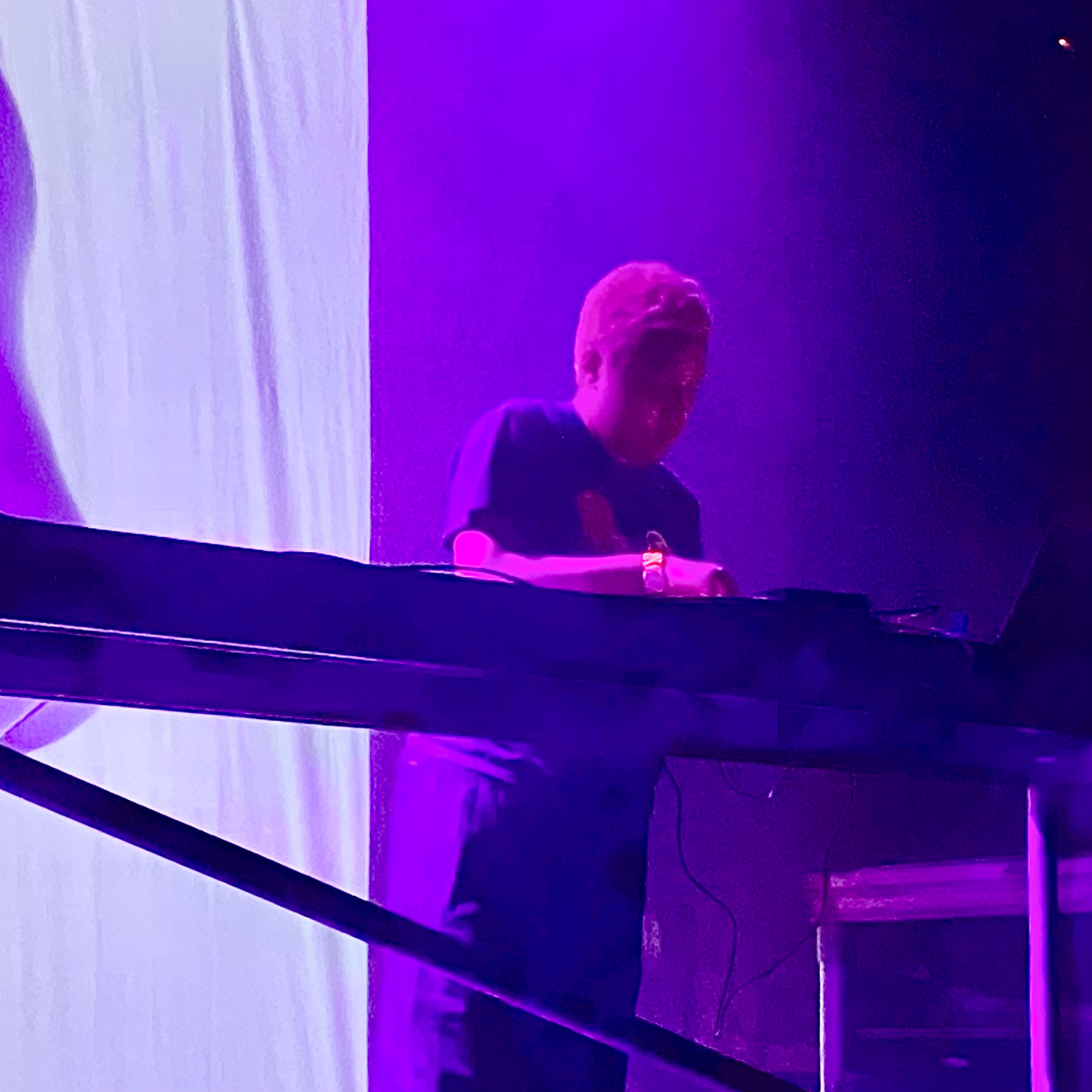
- Loraine James making her NYC debut at the Knockdown Center on May 1, 2022

Background information
- Also known as: Whatever the Weather
- Born: 18 December 1995 (age 30); Enfield, London, England
- Genres: Electronic; IDM
- Occupations: Musician; producer
- Years active: 2015–present
- Labels: Fu Inle; Hyperdub; Ghostly International; Phantom Limb

Loraine James (born 18 December 1995), also known as Whatever the Weather, is a British electronic music producer and musician.

== Early life ==
Loraine James was raised in an Alma Estate tower block in Enfield, North London. Her interest in music began in childhood. She took piano lessons, and was allured by 2000s alternative bands like Paramore and Death Cab for Cutie, as well as the calypso and funk music her mother introduced her to. In her adolescence, James took an interest in electronic music and was inspired by IDM artists like Squarepusher and Telefon Tel Aviv.

She majored in commercial music at the University of Westminster. Despite this, James planned on following in the footsteps of her mother and pursuing a career in education.

James is queer.

== Career ==
James continued to work on music during her spare time, producing a number of experimental electronic tracks. Starting 2015, she released many of these tracks on Bandcamp. In 2017, she released Detail through Fu Inle Records, before signing with electronic music record label Hyperdub.

In 2019, her Hyperdub-released album For You and I received significant attention and topped end-of-year lists in publications including The Quietus and DJ Mag, where it was named Favourite Album of the Year. The following year, James released two EPs; Hmm in July followed by Nothing in October, a four-track EP featuring a cadre of international vocalists such as Uruguayan singer Lila Tirando a Violeta, Iranian-born rapper Tardast, and HTRK's Jonnine Standish. In early 2021, she remotely collaborated with Dominican performance artist and dancer Isabel Lewis for CTM's 2021 virtual edition.

Her album, Reflection, was conceived during the COVID-19 lockdown after she had quit her teaching job to focus on music. Released in June 2021, the experimental album encompasses a variety of genres and was lauded by critics.

In February 2022, James announced that she had adopted the moniker Whatever the Weather and that an eponymous album would be released in April 2022. The lead single "17°C" and its accompanying music video were previewed. The following month, she released a collaborative EP with TSVI, titled 053.

Her third release of the year, James' album Building Something Beautiful for Me was released on 7 October 2022 through Phantom Limb. It is an homage to American composer Julius Eastman and is inspired by a mix of his unreleased and previously available works.

In 2023, James released Gentle Confrontation, which features guest appearances from KeiyaA, Ritchie, Corey Mastrangelo, Marina Herlop, Eden Samara, George Riley, and Contour.

Under the pseudonym Whatever the Weather, James released Whatever the Weather II in 2025. Her album Detached from the Rest of You was released on May 8, 2026.

== Discography ==
=== Albums ===
As Loraine James

- Detail (2017)
- For You and I (2019)
- Reflection (2021)
- Building Something Beautiful for Me (2022)
- Gentle Confrontation (2023)
- Detached from the Rest of You (2026)

As Whatever the Weather

- Whatever the Weather (2022)
- Whatever the Weather II (2025)

=== Extended plays ===
- Hmm (2020)
- Nothing (2020)
