= Brian Ennals =

American rapper

- Born: Annapolis, Maryland, US
- Origin: Baltimore, Maryland, US
- Genre: Hip-hop
- Occupation: Rapper
- Years active: 2010–present
- Label: Phantom Limb

Brian Ennals is an American rapper based in Baltimore. He has produced music on his own and with Infinity Knives (Tariq Ravelomanana).

== Music career ==
Ennals released solo albums Untitled (2010) and Candy Cigarettes in 2013. He contributed to the Infinity Knives album Dear, Sudan (2020) and as a duo they have made the albums Rhino XXL (2020), King Cobra (2022), and A City Drowned in God's Black Tears (2025). A reviewer for The Quietus wrote that "together, Infinity Knives and Brian Ennals might seem like the poster boys for alternative or experimental hip hop, but King Cobra proves that labels can be meaningless."

In 2026, Ennals released Boatshoes, a collaborative album with New York record producer Blockhead.

== Personal life ==
Ennals was born in Annapolis, Maryland, raised in Severn, Maryland, and went to college at Howard University in Washington, D.C. He has lived in Anne Arundel County, Maryland most of his life. He became a father in 2020.

== Discography ==
=== Solo albums ===
- Untitled (2010)
- Candy Cigarettes (2013)

=== Albums with Infinity Knives ===
- Rhino XXL (self-released, 2020)
- King Cobra (Phantom Limb, 2022)
- A City Drowned in God's Black Tears (Phantom Limb, 2025)

=== Albums with Blockhead ===
- Boatshoes (Phantom Limb, 2026)
