= Sool (disambiguation) =

Sool may refer to:

- Sool, Somaliland, a region in eastern Somaliland
- Sool, Switzerland, a village in the Swiss canton of Glarus
- Sool (album), an album by Ellen Allien
