= Berlinette =

Berlinette may refer to:

- The Berlinetta style of automobile body.
- The Alpine A110, a sports car produced by the French manufacturer Alpine from 1961 to 1977, often simply called the Berlinette
- Three models of cars made by Hommell, a French automobile manufacturer
- The Berlinette (album), by German experimental techno producer Ellen Allien
