= Joseph Costa =

Joseph Costa may refer to:

- Joseph Costa (soccer) (born 1992), Australian footballer
- Joseph Costa (photographer) (1904–1988), American newspaper photographer
- Joseph Costa (aviator) (1909–1998), Luso-American aviator
- Joseph Desler Costa (born 1980), photographer and musician

== See also ==
- Joseph da Costa (1683–1753), English merchant
