= Map of What Is Effortless =

Studio album by Telefon Tel Aviv
- Released: January 27, 2004
- Genre: Electronica
- Length: 45:15
- Label: Hefty

Telefon Tel Aviv chronology
Fahrenheit Fair Enough (2001)	Map of What Is Effortless (2004)	Remixes Compiled (2007)

Singles from Map of What Is Effortless
- 1. "My Week Beats Your Year" Released: 2004

Map of What Is Effortless is the second studio album by Telefon Tel Aviv, an American electronic music duo consisting of Joshua Eustis and Charles Cooper. It was released on Hefty Records in 2004.

== Critical reception ==
Professional ratings
Review scores
Source	Rating
AllMusic	4.5/5 stars
Entertainment Weekly	B+
Pitchfork	6.3/10
PopMatters	favorable
Stylus Magazine	A−

Ron Schepper of Stylus Magazine called the album "a marvelous fusion of electronica and soul." Michael Endelman of Entertainment Weekly said, "Loneliness, loss, and the darker side of soul music are the subjects of Telefon Tel Aviv's second album, a stunning collision of techno blips, lush strings, and swooning R&B vocals." Sam Samuelson of AllMusic commented that "TTA manage to not only make their first great album, but also put in the first entry for the best of 2004."

== Track listing ==
No.	Title	Length
1.	"When It Happens It Moves All by Itself"	3:28
2.	"I Lied"	5:53
3.	"My Week Beats Your Year"	4:09
4.	"Bubble and Spike"	3:59
5.	"Map of What Is Effortless"	5:23
6.	"Nothing Is Worth Losing That"	5:07
7.	"What It Is Without the Hand That Wields It"	6:15
8.	"What It Was Will Never Again"	4:16
9.	"At the Edge of the World You Will Still Float"	6:45
Total length:		45:15

Japanese edition bonus tracks
No.	Title	Length
10.	"Jouzu Desu Ne"	4:36
11.	"Sound in a Dark Room"	7:46
Total length:		57:41

== Personnel ==
Credits adapted from liner notes.

Telefon Tel Aviv

- Joshua Eustis – lyrics (3), hammer (3), sound design, guitar, bass guitar, Nord keyboards, Rhodes piano, Wurlitzer piano, moog synthesizer, drums, claps, string arrangement, orchestra conducting, programming
- Charles Cooper – hammer (3), sound design, guitar, bass guitar, Nord keyboards, Rhodes piano, percussion, claps, snaps, orchestra recording, programming

Additional personnel

- Loyola University Chamber Orchestra – guest appearance (1, 2, 5, 7, 9)
- Damon Aaron – lyrics (2, 6, 9), vocals (2, 6, 9)
- Lindsay Anderson – vocals (3, 4, 8, 11), lyrics (4, 8)
- Kevin Duneman – drums (3, 6, 9)
- Turk Dietrich – impetus (5), wall (9)
- Fredo Nogueira – slide guitar (6), wall (9)
- Wendell Harrison – flute (6)
- Vahan Baladouni – orchestra recording assistance
- Brian Gardner – mastering
