= Immolate Yourself =

Studio album by Telefon Tel Aviv
- Released: January 20, 2009
- Genre: Electropop
- Length: 46:15
- Label: BPitch Control
- Producer: Joshua Eustis; Charles Cooper; Turk Dietrich

Telefon Tel Aviv chronology
Remixes Compiled (2007)	Immolate Yourself (2009)	Dreams Are Not Enough (2019)

Singles from Immolate Yourself
- 1. "You Are the Worst Thing in the World" Released: 2009; 2. "The Birds" Released: 2012

Immolate Yourself is the third studio album by Telefon Tel Aviv, an American electronic music duo consisting of Joshua Eustis and Charles Cooper. It was released on BPitch Control in 2009. It peaked at number 17 on the Billboard Top Dance/Electronic Albums chart. Two days after its release, Cooper died of an accidental overdose of sleeping pills and alcohol.

== Background ==
In a 2016 interview with Huck, Joshua Eustis recalled that they were listening to OMD a lot during the making of the album. He added: "We were listening to a lot of minimal wave and stuff like that. A lot of krautrock and psychedelic stuff – all of these things that we loved but we still wanted to have some element of futurism and romanticism and that's kind of what came out."

== Critical reception ==
Professional ratings
Aggregate scores
Source	Rating
Metacritic	75/100
Review scores
Source	Rating
AllMusic	4/5 stars
Cokemachineglow	77%
The Guardian	4/5 stars
The Phoenix	3/4 stars
Pitchfork	6.4/10
PopMatters	5/10
Slant Magazine	4.5/5 stars
URB	4/5 stars

At Metacritic, which assigns a weighted average score out of 100 to reviews from mainstream critics, the album received an average score of 75, based on 15 reviews, indicating "generally favorable reviews".

Jesse Cataldo of Slant Magazine stated that "it's the rare electronic work that feels entirely alive, exhibiting shocking versatility and a strong feel for creating vibrant, engaging environments." David Abravanel of Cokemachineglow called the album "the most consistent release from the duo."

== Track listing ==
No.	Title	Length
1.	"The Birds"	6:38
2.	"Your Mouth"	4:09
3.	"M"	3:42
4.	"Helen of Troy"	3:12
5.	"Mostly Translucent"	4:16
6.	"Stay Away from Being Maybe"	4:23
7.	"I Made a Tree on the Wold"	4:39
8.	"Your Every Idol"	4:55
9.	"You Are the Worst Thing in the World"	4:44
10.	"Immolate Yourself"	5:38
Total length:		46:15

== Personnel ==
Credits adapted from liner notes.

Telefon Tel Aviv

- Joshua Eustis – performance, production, design, photography
- Charles Cooper – performance, production

Additional personnel

- Turk Dietrich – performance (5), production (5)
- Ryan Rapsys – drums (10)
- Rolan Vega – some sounds (10)
- Roger Seibel – mastering
- Wolfel – design
- James Hughes – typography

== Charts ==
Chart	Peak position
US Top Dance/Electronic Albums (Billboard)	17
