= Infinity Knives =

American musician

- Born: Tariq Ravelomanana; Tanzania
- Origin: Baltimore, Maryland, U.S.
- Genre: Alternative hip-hop
- Years active: 2019–present
- Label: Phantom Limb
- Formerly of: Loris
- Website: infinityknives666.bandcamp.com/music

Tariq Ravelomanana, known by the stage name Infinity Knives, is a Tanzanian-born American multi-instrumentalist based in Baltimore.

== Early life ==
Ravelomanana was born in Tanzania and spent his early childhood in various African countries including Madagascar, Mozambique, South Africa and Zambia, before settling in Baltimore, Maryland as a junior high school student.

== Music career ==
As a solo musician, Infinity Knives has released the albums In the Mouth of Sadness (Ugly Nigga From Heaven) (2019) and Dear, Sudan (2020). A reviewer for Loud and Quiet wrote that the latter showcases "Ravelomanana's deep love – and knowledge of – a range of genres, from classical, to hip-hop, to ambient [. . .] What's remarkable about Dear, Sudan is how well these disparate parts fit together to form a cohesive album, carrying the listener effortlessly from track to track, immersing you in Ravelomanana's sonic universe."

He has collaborated with Randi Withani and David Jacober, as the experimental post-rock band Loris, who released their debut self-titled album in 2020. As a duo with Brian Ennals, they have made the albums Rhino XXL (2020), King Cobra (2022), and A City Drowned in God's Black Tears (2025). A reviewer for The Quietus wrote that "together, Infinity Knives and Brian Ennals might seem like the poster boys for alternative or experimental hip-hop, but King Cobra proves that labels can be meaningless."

== Discography ==
=== Solo albums ===
- In the Mouth of Sadness (Ugly Nigga From Heaven) (self-released, 2019)
- Dear, Sudan (Phantom Limb, 2020)

=== Albums with Loris ===
- Loris (2020)

=== Albums with Brian Ennals ===
- Rhino XXL (self-released, 2020)
- King Cobra (Phantom Limb, 2022)
- A City Drowned in God's Black Tears (Phantom Limb, 2025)
