= A City Drowned in God's Black Tears =

Studio album by Infinity Knives and Brian Ennals
- Released: April 4, 2025
- Genre: Hip-hop
- Length: 45:30
- Label: Phantom Limb

Infinity Knives and Brian Ennals chronology
King Cobra (2022)	A City Drowned in God's Black Tears (2025)

Infinity Knives chronology
King Cobra (2022)	A City Drowned in God's Black Tears (2025)

Brian Ennals chronology
King Cobra (2022)	A City Drowned in God's Black Tears (2025)	Boatshoes (2026)

A City Drowned in God's Black Tears is a collaborative studio album by American musicians Infinity Knives and Brian Ennals. It was released on April 4, 2025, through Phantom Limb.

== Background ==
Tariq Ravelomanana, better known under the pseudonym Infinity Knives, is an American record producer and multi-instrumentalist. American rapper Brian Ennals previously contributed vocals to Infinity Knives' album Dear, Sudan (2020). A City Drowned in God's Black Tears is the duo's third collaborative album, following Rhino XXL (2020) and King Cobra (2022). Most of the album was recorded at Frances Malvaiz and Griffin Murphy's home studio, the basement of a detached house in Hampden, Baltimore.

The album was released on April 4, 2025, through Phantom Limb. Music videos were released for "Sometimes, Papi Chulo" and "Everyone I Love Is Depressed". A lyric video was released for "The Iron Wall".

== Critical reception ==
Professional ratings
Review scores
Source	Rating
Spectrum Culture	88%

A City Drowned in God's Black Tears received online acclaim.

Justin Sayles of The Ringer stated, "A City is backdropped by moody, noisy production and filled with Modest Mouse references, self-medicating cocaine use, and pure aggression that'll be a good litmus test for how you view the world." Sumugan Sivanesan of Cyclic Defrost wrote, "Speaking truth to power, it is an exhilarating listen from start to finish, that makes clear to me how self-censorship has become normalised in my milieu." Andre Gee of Rolling Stone praised Infinity Knives' "adventurous, electronic-driven tracks" and Brian Ennals' "sharp social commentary and self-effacing sense of humor".

Arusa Qureshi of The Quietus commented that the album "is another bold progression in their DIY approach, but with even more contempt, exasperation and bitterness at the state of all things." She added, "Once again, the pair have created a project that underscores their propensity for social critique, while affirming a desire to remain authentically imperfect in their approach to creativity and experimentation." Hanif Abdurraqib of The New Yorker called it "among the most expansive and ambitious of the albums I loved this year."

=== Accolades ===
Accolades for A City Drowned in God's Black Tears
Publication	List	Rank	Ref.
PopMatters	The 10 Best Hip-Hop Albums of 2025	9	
The Ringer	The 25 Best Albums of 2025	20	
Rolling Stone	The Best Albums of 2025 So Far	—	
Spin	Best Albums of 2025 (So Far)	—	

== Track listing ==
A City Drowned in God's Black Tears track listing
No.	Title	Length
1.	"The Iron Wall" (featuring Franki3)	4:05
2.	"Live at the Chinese Buffett"	3:15
3.	"A City Drowning. God's Black Tears." (featuring The Lil' Black Oxen, Émile Joseph Weeks, and Nicolas Ratany)	7:37
4.	"Baggy"	3:26
5.	"Soft Pack Shorty" (featuring Eze Jackson and Dale Rath)	3:32
6.	"Тревога/Trevoga" (featuring Vladlena Volodkevich and The Lil' Black Oxen)	2:48
7.	"Sometimes, Papi Chulo" (featuring Gabriela Bibiana)	3:25
8.	"Everyone I Love Is Depressed"	3:30
9.	"Two Headed Buffalo" (featuring The Lil' Black Oxen, Boat Water, Randi Whithani, Marci Ray, and Natalia De Oliveira)	7:21
10.	"Foggy (Live at the Voxel)" (featuring Mind on Fire Orchestra)	3:36
11.	"O Trouble" (featuring Allison Clendandiel)	2:51
Total length:		45:30

Notes

- "Sometimes, Papi Chulo" contains an interpolation of "Three Waves" by Dan Hanrahan.

== Personnel ==
Credits adapted from liner notes.

- Frances Malvaiz / Franki3 – vocals (1, 2, 9), engineering
- Dale Rath – vocals (2, 5)
- Émile Joseph Weeks – tenor vocals (3)
- Mike Walls – additional mastering (3)
- Vladneva Volodkevich – Russian translation (6), vocals (6)
- Troy Long – keyboards (6)
- Keith Decker – bass guitar (6)
- Griffin Murphy – drums (6), engineering
- Gabriela Bibiana – guitar (7), vocals (7)
- Randi "Whithani" Roberts – soprano vocals (8)
- Natalia De Oliveira – tenor vocals (9)
- Marci Ray – baritone vocals (9), alto vocals (9)
- Nicolas Ratany Randrianarivelo – baritone vocals
- Erik "Boat Water" Wagner – guitar, vocals
- Eze Jackson – additional advice, skits, voice acting
- Blockhead – additional samples
- Infinity Knives – engineering, mastering
