= Fahrenheit Fair Enough =

Studio album by Telefon Tel Aviv
- Released: September 18, 2001
- Genre: IDM
- Length: 40:55
- Label: Hefty

Telefon Tel Aviv chronology
Fahrenheit Fair Enough (2001)	Map of What Is Effortless (2004)

Fahrenheit Fair Enough is the debut studio album by Telefon Tel Aviv, an American electronic music duo consisting of Joshua Eustis and Charles Cooper. It was released on Hefty Records in 2001. The reissue edition of the album, with additional bonus tracks, was released on Ghostly International in 2016.

== Critical reception ==
Professional ratings
Review scores
Source	Rating
AllMusic	4/5 stars
BBC	favorable
Exclaim!	7/10
Pitchfork	6.8/10
PopMatters	7/10
Stylus Magazine	D+

Kenyon Hopkin of AllMusic called the album "a soothing listen and one that'll bring you down gently." Peter Marsh of BBC commented that "Apparently the pair came together through a shared love of 'innovative classical music' and while that's not maybe immediately apparent, there is a linear progression to the pieces here that transcend the usual piling up and subtraction that passes for structure in much electronica." Paul Cooper of Pitchfork said, "Though Fahrenheit Fair Enough includes nothing incisive or insightful, it's nonetheless an intriguing release." He added, "it's somewhat frustrating because, while the duo occasionally displays the beauty they're truly capable of, they generally settle for a disappointing simulacrum."

== Track listing ==
No.	Title	Length
1.	"Fahrenheit Fair Enough"	6:40
2.	"TTV"	3:34
3.	"Lotus Above Water"	3:33
4.	"John Thomas on the Inside Is Nothing but Foam"	5:14
5.	"Life Is All About Taking Things In and Putting Things Out"	4:45
6.	"Your Face Reminds Me of When I Was Old"	6:55
7.	"What's the Use of Feet If You Haven't Got Legs?"	4:15
8.	"Introductory Nomenclature"	4:37
9.	"Fahrenheit Far Away"	1:22
Total length:		40:55

2016 reissue edition bonus tracks
No.	Title	Length
10.	"Reak What (Archive '99)"	4:38
11.	"Fahrenheit Fair Enough (Archive '99)"	4:00
12.	"Cliccum (Archive '99)"	2:48
13.	"7 8 (Archive '99)"	3:51
14.	"Eight Track Project Cut (Archive '99)"	3:48
15.	"Rittle Alpha (Archive '99)"	3:20
16.	"Rittle Beta (Archive '99)"	1:56
17.	"What's the Use of Feet If You Haven't Got Legs (Archive '99)"	3:43
Total length:		69:11

== Personnel ==
Credits adapted from liner notes.

Telefon Tel Aviv

- Joshua Eustis – music
- Charles Cooper – music

Additional personnel

- Alfredo Nogueira – additional drums (4), acoustic guitar (4)
- Roger Seibel – mastering
- Graphic Havoc – design
- Francesco Clemente – artwork
- Dorothy Zeidman – photography
