= Gentle Confrontation =

Studio album by Loraine James
- Released: 22 September 2023
- Genre: Electronic
- Length: 56:38
- Label: Hyperdub
- Producer: Loraine James

Loraine James chronology
Building Something Beautiful for Me (2022)	Gentle Confrontation (2023)	Detached from the Rest of You (2026)

Singles from Gentle Confrontation
- 1. "2003" Released: 23 May 2023

Gentle Confrontation is the fifth album by London-based electronic musician Loraine James, released on 22 September 2023 through Hyperdub. It was produced by James and received acclaim from critics.

== Background ==
On 23 May 2023, Loraine James announced the release of her fifth studio album, along with the release of the first single "2003".

== Critical reception ==
Professional ratings
Aggregate scores
Source	Rating
AnyDecentMusic?	7.9/10
Metacritic	84/100
Review scores
Source	Rating
Mojo	4/5 stars
Pitchfork	8.0/10
The Skinny	4/5 stars
Uncut	8/10

Gentle Confrontation received a score of 84 out of 100 on review aggregator Metacritic based on four critics' reviews, indicating "universal acclaim". Uncut called the album "a varied, disjointed, entirely unpredictable yet utterly singular record", and Mojo felt that "it's the emotional, cathartic journey of the chief protagonist that captivates the most". Pitchfork's Christine Kakaire wrote that James "uses chaotic arrangements and glitchy drums to express knotty, difficult-to-name emotions" on the album, which "sprawls, and each track settles into a distinct tonality".

The Wire called the tracks "vignettes of memory and emotion, which see her thoughtful production informed by IDM, glitch and electronic emo. True to the album's concept, there's a charming bedroom maximalism" and concluded that it is a "lovely, affecting record". Patrick Gamble of The Skinny found that the "most interesting moments are those where James' voice takes centre stage" as she "take a scalpel blade to her discography, only to reassemble the pieces into a record that plays like a victory lap".

=== Accolades ===
Publications' year-end list appearances for Gentle Confrontation
Critic/Publication	List	Rank	Ref
Clash	Clash's Albums of the Year	8	
Exclaim!	Exclaim!'s Top 50 Albums of 2023	26	
The Guardian	The Guardian's Top 50 Albums of 2023	36	
NME	NME's Best Albums of 2023	25	
PopMatters	PopMatters' Top 80 Albums of 2023	13	

== Track listing ==
Gentle Confrontation track listing
No.	Title	Writer(s)	Length
1.	"Gentle Confrontation"	Loraine James	4:20
2.	"2003"	James; Jeff McIlwain	2:39
3.	"Let U Go" (featuring Keiyaa)	James; Chakeiya Richmond	4:23
4.	"Déjà Vu" (featuring Ritchie)	James; Nathanial Ritchie	2:51
5.	"Prelude of Tired of Me"	James	2:02
6.	"Glitch the System (Glitch Bitch 2)"	James	3:34
7.	"I DM U"	James	4:23
8.	"One Way Ticket to the Midwest (Emo)" (featuring Corey Mastrangelo)	James	2:25
9.	"Cards with the Grandparents"	James	3:21
10.	"While They Were Singing" (featuring Marina Herlop)	James; Herlop	4:22
11.	"Try for Me" (featuring Eden Samara)	James; Eden Samara	4:04
12.	"Tired of Me"	James	2:19
13.	"Speechless" (with George Riley)	James; George Riley	4:57
14.	"Disjointed (Feeling Like a Kid Again)"	James	4:05
15.	"I'm Trying to Love Myself"	James	3:22
16.	"Saying Goodbye" (featuring Contour)	James; Charles Cooper III; Joshua Eustis; Khari Lucas	3:31
Total length:			56:38
