= Different Days =

"Different Days" may refer to:

== Music ==
- Different Days (L'Altra album), 2005
- Different Days (The Charlatans album), 2017
- "Different Days", a song by Jason Isbell
- "Different Days", a song by The Men
- "Different Day", a song by Playboi Carti from his 2025 album Music
