= Yndi Halda =

English post-rock band

- Origin: Kent, England
- Genres: Post rock, instrumental rock
- Years active: 2001–present
- Labels: Burnt Toast Records (US); Big Scary Monsters (UK); MoorWorks (Japan)
- Members: James Vella; Jack Lambert; Daniel Neal; Oliver Newton; Simon Hampshire; Phil Self
- Past members: Alexander Petersen; Brendan Grieve; Daniel Lovegrove
- Website: www.yndihalda.com

Yndi Halda (pronounced YIN-dee hal-DAR and stylised "yndi halda" in lower case) are an English post-rock band from Kent. "Yndi Halda" is Old Norse for "Enjoy Eternal Bliss", also the name of their debut release. The band's music is characterised by expansive, cinematic pieces that have seen them compared to post-rock and modern classical genres.

== History ==
Yndi Halda are a post-rock group from Kent, England whose lengthy compositions include sweeping strings, multi-part vocal harmonies and dramatic crescendos. The group was formed in 2001 by guitarist and lead vocalist James Vella, guitarist Jack Lambert, violinist Daniel Neal, and drummer Oliver Newton, all of whom were teenagers - and attendees of the same school - at the time. The line-up has since expanded to include Simon Hampshire (bass guitar and vocals) and Philip Self (keyboards, guitar and vocals).

After years of playing together, the band's debut recording Enjoy Eternal Bliss was initially self-released in 2006, and gained the group a following despite its limited availability. The group signed to European label Big Scary Monsters and US imprint Burnt Toast Vinyl, both of whom re-released Enjoy Eternal Bliss as a full-length in 2007, including a previously unreleased song. Yndi Halda toured across the UK, Europe, North America, and Asia in support of the album.

Enjoy Eternal Bliss enjoyed favourable reviews on release and placed the band alongside peers Mogwai, Godspeed You! Black Emperor, Explosions in the Sky, Mono, and Sigur Rós. Despite still being billed as an EP, the release runs more than one hour in length.

In 2016, after a lengthy hiatus, Yndi Halda returned to public visibility with a brand new album, Under Summer. Well-received critically, the album placed a greater emphasis on songwriting and vocals than its largely instrumental predecessor. The band toured in the UK, Europe, the US and Mexico, and Asia in support of Under Summer and its accompanying EP A Sun-Coloured Shaker, released in 2018 and subsequently remixed by New York electronic / instrumental hip-hop artist Prefuse73 in 2019.

== Members ==
Current members

- James Vella (guitars, vocals)
- Jack Lambert (guitars)
- Daniel Neal (violin)
- Simon Hampshire (bass guitar, vocals)
- Phil Self (keyboards, vocals)
- Oliver Newton (drums, vocals)

Former members

- Alexander Petersen (bass)
- Brendan Grieve (bass)
- Daniel Lovegrove (bass)

== Discography ==
- Enjoy Eternal Bliss (2006)
- Under Summer (2016)
- A Sun-Coloured Shaker (2018)
- A Sun-Coloured Shaker remix by Prefuse73 (2019)

== Side projects ==
=== A Lily ===
James Vella has a side project called A Lily, and writes fiction.

==== Discography ====
- wake:sleep (2006), album, Dynamophone Records
- I Dress My Ankles with God's Sweetest Words (2008), EP, Dynamophone Records
- Thunder Ate The Iron Tree (2011), album, p*dis Records, Japan only
- Lupa (2013), EP, Love Thy Neighbour Records (UK), Aagoo Records (USA)
- Ten Drones on Cassette (2018), album, Sound in Silence Records
- Id-Dar Tal-Missier (2018), album, Blank Editions (UK), Kingfisher Bluez (USA)
- Sleep Through The Storm (2020), album, Bytes Records
- Saru l-Qamar (2024), album, Phantom Limb
- Virgin Stoner: Works 2001-2004 (2024), album, Phantom Limb

==== Bibliography ====
- Devourings (2014), short story collection, Wounded Wolf Press
- Devoured Further (2015), audio story collection, Open Pen

=== O Rosa Records ===
From 2006 to 2012, Vella ran the record label O Rosa Records, named after a passage from Herman Hesse's novel Steppenwolf. The label released music by Whip, Sylvain Chauveau, and Rivulets before folding. Since 2017, he has run the label Phantom Limb

=== The Lunchtime Sardine Club ===
The Lunchtime Sardine Club is Newton's solo side project. The debut album, Icecapades, can be ordered in physical or digital form from the group's Bandcamp page.
