= Ez Minzoku =

Studio album by Foodman
- Released: May 13, 2016
- Genre: Juke; footwork; avant-garde; minimal; glitch; experimental; IDM; hip-hop
- Length: 40:02
- Label: Orange Milk Records; Noumenal Loom
- Producer: Takahide Higuchi

Foodman chronology
This Is A Pen (2015)	Ez Minzoku (2016)	S.A.F.E. (2016)

Ez Minzoku (Japanese for "Easy Ethnic") is a studio album by Japanese electronic music producer Takahide Higuchi, known in the United States as Foodman. Two tracks on the album, "Mid Summer Night" and "Minzoku," are from a previous record by Foodman titled Are Kore (2013). Ez Minzoku is a "MIDI glitch" record (categorized as such by Higuchi) that follows the same experimental style of Higuchi's other releases and consists of minimal arrangements of clean MIDI instruments such as horns, woodwinds, and human samples. It was released on May 13, 2016 by Orange Milk Records and Noumenal Loom to favorable reviews from critics and landed on numerous year-end lists.

== Background ==
The style of Ez Minzoku was inspired by Takahide Higuchi's experience of performing a J-pop MIDI file through a PC music sequencer. The sequencer had a glitch where it assigned notes to the wrong sound source. According to Higuchi, this led him to have an "awful" yet "tremendous" feeling from listening to the corrupted version of the song, which inspired him to create a "MIDI glitch" record. According to Higuchi, the album is about easily making music based on someone's "most primitive self" and the relationship between Nyabinghi music and footwork.

Two tracks that appear on Ez Minzoku, "Mid Summer Night" and "Minzoku," was first on a record Foodman previously released with Dubliminal Bounce in 2013 titled Are Kore. They were placed on Ez Minzoku as instructed by Orange Milk leader Keith Rankin. Higuchi was initially reluctant to put them on the album since they didn't match the style of the other songs. However, he later decided to add them to give the album a bit of variety. Orange Milk Records originally planned to release Ez Minzoku in 2015, shortly after the distribution of Foodman's mini-album Couldwork (2015). However, the making of the album was completed much later than planned, leading it to be released on May 13, 2016.

== Composition ==
Ez Minzoku is the least dance-tinged release in Takahide Higuchi's discography. As Orange Milk Records' press release stated, Ez Minzoku involves Takahide Higuchi using the "adventurous" production he incorporated in his previous works to execute a "negative space minimalis[t]" style consisting of clean MIDI instruments. Journalist Andrew Ryce compared the album's use of bright and "naive" textures to the works of PC Music. The album's "MIDI glitch" structure is most apparent on the closing track "Rock," where a laughing snippet is played when the kick drum is supposed to perform and a conga sample is triggered in the places where snares and hi-hats are supposed to play.

Sounds on the album include treble horns, woodwinds, flutes, human screams and groans, electric guitar riffs, whistles, "and treacly synth lines that sound kind of like Dntel's cotton candy programming for the Postal Service," stated Thump. Ryce wrote that Ez Minzoku combines together "cutesy" tones with "abrasive" ones, which gives it a "deranged edge." Examples include "regal horns" performing with screaming on "Jazz," a distorted guitar playing a bright riff on "Rock," and noise and "unstable" vocals playing over a jazz instrumental on "Beybey." Ryce noted the LP's horn sounds to stand out the most due to their "queasy" and high-pitched nature.

== Reception ==
Professional ratings
Review scores
Source	Rating
Exclaim!	7/10
Resident Advisor	3.8/5
Tiny Mix Tapes	4.5/5 marks

Ryce, reviewing for Resident Advisor, called Ez Minzoku "exciting" for how it "keeps [the listener] on [their] toes" and "never settles into a comfort zone" but also criticized it as "annoying" and "totally devoid of structure" in some places. As Exclaim! described the charm of the LP, "It's as if the producer has built an impossibly ornate and tiny world, with rules that he alone has defined, a space that when taken in from afar appears completely out of place, yet up close feels like home."

Tiny Mix Tapes reviewer Sam Goldner wrote the album will "hijack [the listener's] spine and leave [him] wriggling on the floor, begging for more of that sweet, dangerous squeak." He described it as "a how-to manual for finally fitting that square peg in the round hole, 13 choreographed exercises that wobble not just because of the kooky soundbites stringing them from head to toe, but because of Foodman's singular taste for maddening rhythmic genesis." Tiny Mix Tapes placed the album at number 16 on its list of the best releases of 2016, claiming, "Foodman rigidly disavowed the entire jazz-blues-rock tradition, inventing and exploring a totally unique, jagged para-pop candyland."

Ian Martin, writing for The Japan Times, called it one of Japan's best indie records released in 2016, describing it as a "joyously eclectic assault of cut-up rhythms, toy instrument sounds and synth farts that combined a child-like sense of exploration with a great deal of sonic sophistication." The album landed at number 27 on Thump's year-end list, where Joyce called it Higuchi's "most hilarious effort yet" and "a joyous cacophony of sounds that shouldn't be able to coexist." In terms of year-end lists of the best experimental albums of 2016, Ez Minzoku made its way onto an unordered Pitchfork list and at number eight on a ranked list by PopMatters. As PopMatters stated on the list, "En Mizoku can feel like a crisp, snow-crested morning at 7:05 am, when everything seems grotesque and unmanageable. But once you've sat down at the kitchen table and sipped your Joe, you think, 'Everything really is grotesque and unmanageable, but I like it.'"

== Track listing ==
Derived from the official Orange Milk Records Bandcamp.

No.	Title	Length
1.	"Beybey" (featuring Taigen Kawabe)	3:06
2.	"Uoxtu"	3:54
3.	"Nagaremasu"	2:24
4.	"dddance"	3:49
5.	"Hikari"	1:36
6.	"Jazz"	3:06
7.	"Otonarabi"	2:24
8.	"Mid Summer Night" (featuring Diskomargaux)	3:16
9.	"Ure Pill"	3:36
10.	"Yami Nabe"	3:53
11.	"Waterfall"	3:13
12.	"Minzoku"	2:37
13.	"Rock"	3:08
Total length:		40:02

== Release history ==
Region	Date	Format(s)	Label
Worldwide	May 13, 2016	Digital download; vinyl	Orange Milk
Worldwide	May 13, 2016	Cassette	Noumenal Loom
