= Enjoy Eternal Bliss =

EP by Yndi Halda
- Released: 23 January 2007
- Genre: Post-rock
- Length: 65:41
- Label: BSM Records (UK), Burnt Toast Vinyl (US), XTAL Records (Japan)

Professional ratings
Review scores
Source	Rating
Drowned In Sound	(9/10)
Pitchfork Media	(5.1/10)
Tiny Mix Tapes	3/5 stars

Enjoy Eternal Bliss is the debut EP by English post-rock band Yndi Halda released on the Big Scary Monsters Recording Company in the UK; Burnt Toast Vinyl in the USA and XTAL Records in Japan. It was first made available online on 13 November 2006 before being released in shops in February 2007. The EP was previously self-released as a 3-track demo through the band's website and live performances. This version of the EP did not include the track "A Song For Starlit Beaches".

The title "EP" is often called into question due to the record's length. Indeed, only the UK edition of "Enjoy Eternal Bliss" was titled as such - in all other territories it was renamed as an LP or full-length album on behalf of the band.

Kerrang! ranked it as one of the 16 greatest post-rock releases of all-time.

== Track listing ==
1. "Dash and Blast" - 16:51
2. "We Flood Empty Lakes" - 11:41
3. "A Song For Starlit Beaches" - 19:38
4. "Illuminate My Heart, My Darling!" - 17:31
