= Orchestra of Bubbles =

Studio album by Ellen Allien & Apparat
- Released: 17 April 2006
- Recorded: 2005
- Studio: The Panic Room
- Genre: Techno; electronic; IDM
- Length: 57:25
- Label: BPitch Control
- Producer: Ellen Allien; Apparat

Ellen Allien chronology
Thrills (2005)	Orchestra of Bubbles (2006)	Sool (2008)

Apparat chronology
Duplex (2003)	Orchestra of Bubbles (2006)	Walls (2007)

Orchestra of Bubbles is a collaborative studio album by Ellen Allien and Apparat. It was released through BPitch Control on 17 April 2006.

== Critical reception ==
Professional ratings
Review scores
Source	Rating
AllMusic	4/5 stars
Pitchfork	8.5/10
Resident Advisor	4/5 stars

Thom Jurek of AllMusic gave the album 4 stars out of 5, saying, "For anyone sincerely interested in the open territory of electronic music and its possible futures, this is not only a microscope to examine the new bacteria with, it's the pulsing life form beneath it." Philip Sherburne of Pitchfork gave the album an 8.5 out of 10, calling it "an impressive record" and "a remarkable feat of engineering."

Resident Advisor named it the 48th best album of the 2000s.

== Track listing ==
All tracks are written by Ellen Allien and Sascha Ring.

No.	Title	Length
1.	"Turbo Dreams"	4:10
2.	"Way Out"	3:43
3.	"Retina"	4:03
4.	"Rotary"	4:24
5.	"Jet"	6:34
6.	"Sleepless"	3:36
7.	"Metric"	3:31
8.	"Floating Points"	5:13
9.	"Under"	4:54
10.	"Do Not Break"	5:13
11.	"Leave Me Alone"	3:17
12.	"Edison"	3:48
13.	"Bubbles"	4:58
Total length:		57:25

== Personnel ==
Credits adapted from liner notes.

- Ellen Allien – production, recording
- Sascha Ring – production, recording
- Luca Baldini – rave signal (1)
- Katrin Pfänder – strings (3, 7)
- Lisa Stepf – strings (3, 7)

== Charts ==
Chart	Peak position
Belgian Albums (Ultratop Flanders)	61
French Albums (SNEP)	188
