= In the Afternoon =

Studio album by L'Altra
- Released: April 2, 2002
- Genre: Electronic; dream pop; indie rock
- Length: 48:39
- Label: Aesthetics

L'Altra chronology
Music of a Sinking Occasion (2000)	In the Afternoon (2002)	Different Days (2005)

In the Afternoon is a studio album by American band L'Altra. It was released on Aesthetics on April 2, 2002.

== Critical reception ==
Professional ratings
Aggregate scores
Source	Rating
Metacritic	70/100
Review scores
Source	Rating
AllMusic	4/5 stars
Exclaim!	favorable
Pitchfork	7.1/10

At Metacritic, which assigns a weighted average score out of 100 to reviews from mainstream critics, the album received an average score of 70, based on 7 reviews, indicating "generally favorable reviews".

Matt Fink of AllMusic gave the album 4 stars out of 5, saying, "A rich tapestry of soothing aural textures, L'Altra's In the Afternoon is one of the first albums that could be referred to as residing in the realm of pastoral dream pop." He called it "An undeniably pleasant and ultimately rewarding, if not immediately accessible, listen."

== Track listing ==
No.	Title	Length
1.	"Soft Connection"	3:21
2.	"Certainty"	5:24
3.	"Black Arrow"	6:13
4.	"A Delicate Flower"	3:57
5.	"Traffic"	6:52
6.	"Ways Out"	6:19
7.	"Moth in Rain"	5:16
8.	"Broken Mouths"	4:59
9.	"Afternoon Music"	3:01
10.	"Goodbye Music"	3:17
Total length:		48:39

== Personnel ==
Credits adapted from liner notes.

L'Altra

- Eben English – music, additional recording
- Ken Dyber – music, additional recording
- Joseph Costa – music, additional recording, photography
- Lindsay Anderson – music, additional recording

Additional personnel

- Marc Hellner – music
- Fred Lonberg-Holm – music
- Charles Kim – music
- Todd Mattei – music
- Steven Dvorak – music
- Cristian Huepe – music
- Robert Cruz – music
- Joe Grimm – music
- Nate Walcott – music
- Jeremy Lemos – recording, mixing
- Matt Murman – mastering
