= Dreams Are Not Enough =

Studio album by Telefon Tel Aviv
- Released: September 27, 2019
- Genre: Electronic
- Length: 50:02
- Label: Ghostly International
- Producer: Joshua Eustis; Turk Dietrich; Deru

Telefon Tel Aviv chronology
Immolate Yourself (2009)	Dreams Are Not Enough (2019)

Dreams Are Not Enough is the fourth studio album by Telefon Tel Aviv. It was released via Ghostly International on September 27, 2019. It is Joshua Eustis's first album under the Telefon Tel Aviv moniker since the 2009 passing of his bandmate Charles Cooper. Listed top to bottom on the album's front cover, the song titles form a poem.

== Critical reception ==
Professional ratings
Aggregate scores
Source	Rating
Metacritic	84/100
Review scores
Source	Rating
AllMusic	4/5 stars
Pitchfork	8.1/10
Resident Advisor	favorable
Spectrum Culture	favorable
Under the Radar	8.5/10 stars

At Metacritic, which assigns a weighted average score out of 100 to reviews from mainstream critics, the album received an average score of 84, based on 5 reviews, indicating "universal acclaim".

Ryan Keeling of Resident Advisor wrote, "Dreams Are Not Enough is a remarkable return that achieves things the first three Telefon Tel Aviv albums were never quite able to." He added that "the best quality of Dreams Are Not Enough is the fusion of its emotions, as positivity and negativity flow into each other like convergent tributaries of a river." Paul Simpson of AllMusic called the album "An absolutely crushing listen, and every bit as powerful as the previous three TTA albums." Haydon Spenceley of Under the Radar commented that "the record is best enjoyed whole, with headphones, concentration, and responded to with adulation." He said, "Dreams Are Not Enough is 2019's best electronic album, hands down."

== Track listing ==
All tracks are written by Joshua Eustis, except "Arms Aloft" by Eustis and Turk Dietrich.

No.	Title	Length
1.	"I dream of it often:"	4:58
2.	"a younger version of myself,"	5:15
3.	"standing at the bottom of the ocean;"	5:36
4.	"arms aloft,"	7:43
5.	"mouth agape,"	4:57
6.	"eyes glaring,"	6:57
7.	"not seeing,"	6:16
8.	"not breathing,"	4:50
9.	"still as stone in the watery fane."	3:30
Total length:		50:02

== Personnel ==
Credits adapted from liner notes.

- Joshua Eustis – performance, production
- Turk Dietrich – additional production (4)
- Deru – additional production (6), guidance (6)
- Rafael Anton Irisarri – mastering
- Molly Smith – art direction, art execution
- Particula Universum – calligraphy
