= Thrills (Ellen Allien album) =

Studio album by Ellen Allien
- Released: 16 May 2005
- Genre: Techno
- Length: 52:35
- Label: BPitch Control
- Producers: Ellen Allien; Holger Zilske

Ellen Allien chronology
| Berlinette (2003) | Thrills (2005) | Orchestra of Bubbles (2006) |

Thrills is the third solo studio album by German electronic musician Ellen Allien. It was released on BPitch Control on 16 May 2005.

== Critical reception ==
Professional ratings
Aggregate scores
| Source | Rating |
|---|---|
| Metacritic | 72/100 |
Review scores
| Source | Rating |
| AllMusic | 4.5/5 stars |
| Pitchfork | 7.0/10 |
| Stylus Magazine | B+ |
| Tiny Mix Tapes | 3.5/5 stars |

At Metacritic, which assigns a weighted average score out of 100 to reviews from mainstream critics, the album received an average score of 72, based on 11 reviews, indicating "generally favorable reviews".

== Track listing ==
All tracks are written by Ellen Allien and Holger Zilske.

| No. | Title | Length |
|---|---|---|
| 1. | "Come" | 6:38 |
| 2. | "The Brain Is Lost" | 5:18 |
| 3. | "Your Body Is My Body" | 5:20 |
| 4. | "Naked Rain" | 4:54 |
| 5. | "Washing Machine Is Speaking" | 5:26 |
| 6. | "Down" | 4:35 |
| 7. | "Ghost Train" | 3:06 |
| 8. | "Cloudy City" | 6:20 |
| 9. | "She Is with Me" | 5:03 |
| 10. | "Magma" | 8:27 |
| Total length: | | 52:35 |

Enhanced CD edition bonus video
| No. | Title | Length |
|---|---|---|
| 1. | "Down" | 3:56 |

== Personnel ==
Credits adapted from liner notes.

- Ellen Allien – production
- Holger Zilske – production
- Steffi&Steffi – artwork
- Florian Kolmer – photography

== Charts ==
| Chart | Peak position |
|---|---|
| French Albums (SNEP) | 130 |
