= Berlinette (album) =

Studio album by Ellen Allien
- Released: 7 April 2003
- Genre: Techno
- Length: 49:22
- Label: BPitch Control
- Producers: Ellen Allien; H. Zilske

Ellen Allien chronology
Stadtkind (2001)	Berlinette (2003)	Thrills (2005)

Berlinette is the second solo studio album by German electronic musician Ellen Allien. It was released on BPitch Control on 7 April 2003.

== Critical reception ==
Professional ratings
Review scores
Source	Rating
AllMusic	4.5/5 stars
Pitchfork	8.9/10
Stylus Magazine	B−

Mark Pytlik of AllMusic gave the album 4.5 stars out of 5, saying, "Bitingly fierce, technologically adroit, and curiously poppy, Berlinette marks yet another high point in an already superb year for Germanic techno." Todd Burns of Stylus Magazine gave the album a grade of B−, commenting that "Much of the charm of this album lies in the seemingly complex drum programming that Allien brings to the mix."

Pitchfork placed it at number 27 on the "Top 50 Albums of 2003" list.

== Track listing ==
All tracks are written by Ellen Allien and H. Zilske.

No.	Title	Length
1.	"Alles Sehen"	3:50
2.	"Sehnsucht"	6:18
3.	"Trash Scapes Voc"	0:58
4.	"Push"	4:17
5.	"Trash Scapes"	4:40
6.	"Augenblick"	4:39
7.	"Wish"	4:47
8.	"Abstract Pictures"	4:55
9.	"Erdbeermund"	4:13
10.	"Secret"	4:07
11.	"Open"	6:10
Total length:		49:22

== Personnel ==
Credits adapted from liner notes.

- Ellen Allien – vocals, production
- Sascha Ring – some drums
- Stephan Szulzewsky – guitar (3)
- Samuel Ingold – guitar (6, 7, 11)
- Honza – artwork
- Kritzla – font

== Charts ==
Chart	Peak position
French Albums (SNEP)	142
