= Reflection (Loraine James album) =

Studio album by Loraine James
- Released: 4 June 2021
- Genre: Electronic
- Length: 45:40
- Label: Hyperdub
- Producer: Loraine James

Loraine James chronology
Nothing EP (2020)	Reflection (2021)	Whatever the Weather (2022)

Reflection is the second album by London-based electronic musician Loraine James, released through Hyperdub in June 2021, which has been met with critical acclaim. It follows James' 2020 Nothing EP.

== Composition ==
While Reflection is mostly an exploration of "heartfelt" electronica, it also quotes elements from drill music, R&B, techno, and more.

== Critical reception ==
Professional ratings
Aggregate scores
Source	Rating
AnyDecentMusic?	8.3/10
Metacritic	86/100
Review scores
Source	Rating
Beats Per Minute	82%
Crack Magazine	8/10
Mojo	5/5 stars
Pitchfork	7.9/10
PopMatters	10/10

Reflection has received positive reviews. On Metacritic, it holds a score of 86 out of 100, indicating "universal acclaim", based on nine reviews.

Tom Morgan for PopMatters lauded the record as "a work of seductive, heartfelt brilliance", noting that James is "at the absolute peak of her powers." He gave the album a 10 out of 10 rating.

Stephen Worthy of Mojo described the album's tracks as James' "genre-bending confessionals that balance truth with hope." He added that as an "endlessly inventive album," Reflections "sets a noteworthy template for modern British electronic music", notably for being "a succession of counterpoints."

While AllMusic noted that "Reflection doesn't quite have the shock of the new that For You and I did", the online database admitted that "its best moments are still powerful" and that "it would be impossible to mistake the album for anyone else's perspective."

=== Accolades ===
Reflection on year-end lists
Publication	List	Rank	Ref.
Beats Per Minute	BPM's Top 50 Albums of 2021	31	
Clash	Clash Albums of the Year 2021	43	
Pitchfork	The 50 Best Albums of 2021	39	
PopMatters	The 75 Best Albums of 2021	21	
Slant Magazine	The 50 Best Albums of 2021	21	
Stereogum	The 50 Best Albums of 2021	43	

== Track listing ==
Reflection track listing
No.	Title	Length
1.	"Built to Last"	2:17
2.	"Lets Go"	3:41
3.	"Simple Stuff"	3:27
4.	"Black Ting"	4:17
5.	"Insecure Behaviour and Fuckery"	5:00
6.	"Self Doubt (Leaving the Club Early)"	4:34
7.	"On the Lake Outside"	4:51
8.	"Reflection"	3:31
9.	"Change"	7:12
10.	"Running Like That"	4:19
11.	"We're Building Something New"	2:32
Total length:		45:40
