= Richard Skelton =

- Also known as: A Broken Consort, Carousell, Riftmusic, Clouwbeck, Heidika, Harlassen
- Origin: Lancashire, UK
- Genres: Experimental music, drone music, minimalist music
- Occupation: Musician
- Instrument: Multi-instrumentalist
- Years active: 2005–present
- Labels: Sustain-Release, Corbel Stone Press, Tompkins Square

Richard Skelton is an English musician living on the west coast of Ireland.

== Music career ==
Following the death of his wife Louise in 2004, he began to make music as a way of coming to terms with the tragedy. His music, which uses a number of instruments – principally guitar and violin, has been compared with that of Arvo Pärt among others. His recordings explicitly reference places of emotional resonance, specifically the West Pennine Moors, and the area around the sparsely populated parish of Anglezarke. His album Landings has been compared with Brian Eno's Ambient 4: On Land in its evocation of place and memory. Skelton even goes so far as to include artefacts, such as twigs and alder catkins, from significant places in the packaging of his releases.

Most of Skelton's releases have been issued by his own Sustain-Release label – under a range of pseudonyms including A Broken Consort, Carousell and Riftmusic, as well as under his own name – in small editions of CDs with hand-crafted packaging, and often including fragments of poetry. However, some of Skelton's work has attained wider commercial and critical success.

In 2011, Skelton archived the material he had released on Sustain-Release. A box set of his complete recordings to date, titled *SKURA and totalling 20 discs of music, followed. Skelton announced that future editions of both his music and writing would be released on the Corbel Stone Press imprint. The first release was Wolf Notes, a collaboration with his new partner, Autumn Richardson, under the name *AR. The album was released on 1 January 2011. To date, a number of print works and another musical collaboration with Richardson, Stray Birds, have been issued. Two more music works are scheduled for release in mid-2012.

== Personal life ==
Until 2010, Skelton lived in Standish, near Wigan, before relocating to the west coast of Ireland.

== Discography ==
- Heidika, There Is No Cure & Other Songs, Sustain-Release
- Carousell, A Dead ges into Dust, Sustain-Release
- Harlassen, A Way Now, Sustain-Release
- Carousell, Landings,
- A Broken Consort, The Shape Leaves, Sustain-Release
- Riftmusic, Riftmusic, Sustain-Release
- A Broken Consort, Box of Birch (1st Edition), Sustain-Release
- Clouwbeck, A Moraine, Sustain-Release
- A Broken Consort, Crow Autumn (Part One), Sustain-Release
- Heidika, Tide of Bells & the Sea, Sustain-Release
- A Broken Consort, Box of Birch (2nd Edition), Sustain-Release
- A Broken Consort, Crow Autumn (Part Two), Sustain-Release
- Carousell, Black Swallow & Other Songs, Sustain-Release
- Richard Skelton, Landings, Type Records LP/
- Clouwbeck, From Which the River Rises, Sustain-Release
- Richard Skelton, Marking Time, Preservation Records, Type Records LP
- Clouwbeck, Wolfrahm, Sustain-Release
- A Broken Consort, Crow Autumn, Tompkins Square Records
- A Broken Consort, Box of Birch, Tompkins Square Records
- *AR, Wolf Notes, Corbel Stone Press
- Various artists, *SKURA, Sustain-Release (compilation of Skelton material under different names)
- Richard Skelton, Verse of Birds, Corbel Stone Press
- Richard Skelton, These Charms May Be Sung Over a Wound, Phantom Limb
- Richard Skelton, selenodesy, Phantom Limb

=== Collaborations ===
- Agitated Radio Pilot, World Winding Down, Deadslackstring (Skelton co-composes and plays on the track Earthfasts)
- Machinefabriek, Daas, Cold Spring (Skelton contributes to the title track)
- Saddleback, Everything's A Love Letter/Everything's Open To Interpretation, Preservation (Skelton contributes a version of Saddleback's Gerroa Thursday)
- Autumn Grieve, Stray Birds, Corbel Stone Press (Skelton accompanies the songs of Autumn Richardson)
