= Eliot Lipp =

American musician

- Born: 1980 (age 45–46); Tacoma, Washington
- Occupation: Musician
- Years active: 2004–present
- Labels: Eastern Developments Music; Hefty Records; Mush Records; Old Tacoma Records; Young Heavy Souls; Not Not Fun
- Website: eliotlipp.com

Eliot Lipp is an American electronic music artist and DJ based in Brooklyn, New York. His work was picked up by Scott Herren of Prefuse 73 (Warp Records) after Herren heard him working the club circuit. In 2004, Lipp released his first studio album, S/T, with Eastern Developments Music, a label owned by Warp Records.

== Background ==
Lipp was born and raised in Tacoma, Washington and attended art school in San Francisco. After graduating from college, he moved to Los Angeles, Chicago, and back to LA before finally settling in Brooklyn in 2006.

== Career ==
While in Chicago, Lipp produced two full-length albums; by the time he moved to Brooklyn, he had plenty of material to work with. His work made its way into the hands of Scott Herren (Warp Records) and Savath+Savalas (Hefty Records), better known as Prefuse 73. Herren signed to Eastern Developments Music, a label owned by Warp Records in late 2004 and Lipp released his first album, S/T, shortly thereafter. This LP already displayed signs of what is now his signature sound by utilizing Sequential Circuits and Korg ms-20 synths.

In 2005, Lipp signed with Hefty Records and released his EPS Immediate Action #10 and Raptight 12". The release of Tacoma Mockingbird on Hefty Records in January 2006 gave Lipp the courage he needed to quit his job working as a barista in LA. This album took a year to record and is full of songs that remind him of home. Steele Street Scraps, a collaboration with electronic musicians John Hughes, who founded Hefty Records, Victor Berman, and Earmint, appeared in 2006, as did The Days.

In 2007, City Synthesis was released on Miami-based label Metatronix; in 2008, his album The Outside was distributed by Mush Records. Peace Love Weed 3D in 2009 was the first of Lipp's albums to be released on his own record label, Old Tacoma Records (OTR). Over the next two years, OTR released Light Years, a collaborative album with Leo 123 under the name Dark Party, and How We Do: Moves Made, a collaborative album with long-time friend Jasia 10. His 2012 album Shark Wolf Rabbit Snake, now with Pretty Lights Music, garnered a number of remixes. At this point, Lipp moved home to Tacoma to be closer to his family and subsequently recorded and released his ninth studio album, Come to Life, with Young Heavy Souls. He made another major move, this time to Austin, Texas, where he released Skywave in 2017, again on the Detroit label Young Heavy Souls.

On June 29, 2021, Lipp and Michna released a single called Spectra under the name Minutes Unlimited. The pair previously released Making Contact (EP, 2018, Young Heavy Souls); Simple Solutions (EP, 2018); Firewall Breach (EP, 2018); Green Data (LP, 2019, Rellman Enterprises); I.D.E.N.T.I.T.Y. (debut studio album, 2020); Marantz Files (LP, 2020); Gang (EP, 2020); and Solve (unreleased track, 2020). He also collaborates with Alex B and Lane Shaw of Pnuma Trio under the name Lipp Service; with vyle under the name AUBURN; with Willie Burns as Galaxy Toobin'; and with Blockhead under the name Lipphead.

== Musical influences ==
In his hometown of Tacoma, Lipp was influenced by mostly hip-hop artists such as RZA and DJs who have strong roots in hip-hop such as Madlib a.k.a. Quasimoto. When asked what musical genres he found the greatest influence from, Lipp responded, "Bay Area and Detroit rap, classic electro, 1970s fusion, early 1990s techno, and Chicago post-rock bands are all styles that influence my music."

== Discography ==
S/T

- Released: December 12, 2004
- Label: Eastern Developments
- Tracks: "Beverly Rhode", "Deep", "Botched", "Next Beat", "Gordo", "Ca$hed", "Neutral", "One Knot", "Ballkid", "Abercrombie & Pitch", "Like No Tomorrow", "Linc"

Immediate Action #10

- Released: January 1, 2005
- Label: Hefty Records
- Tracks: "Cushman", "Real Tragic", "Sheridan"

Raptight 12"

- Released: December 2, 2005
- Label: Hefty Records
- Tracks: "Raptight", "The Shade", "Nokia"

Tacoma Mockingbird

- Released: February 21, 2006
- Label: Hefty Records
- Tracks: "Glasspipe", "Tic Tac", "Rap Tight", "Brand New", "Times Four", "Last Night", "Check Weight", "Rhyme War", "The People", "Sex Tape", "Mashin' On Em", "Spit Rap", "Vallejo"

The Days

- Released: August 1, 2006
- Label: Hefty Records
- Tracks: "Grab Mic", "Street", "Eye Sore", "Magnetic Part 2", "Robertson", "Wiu", "The Days", "Controlled Pattern", "Shereton", "Koreatown Minimall"

Steel Street Scraps

- Released: October 31, 2006
- Label: Hefty Records
- Tracks: "Illa Than (Earmint Remix)", "Flashlight", "The Intro", "Gangsta Sh*t", "Tic Tac (John Hughes Remix)", "Next Break", "Glasspipe" (Victor Bermon Remix)"; "Choosey", "Moog", "Harmonix"
- Bonus tracks: "Glasspipe (Daedelus Journey to the Center Remix)"

City Synthesis

- Released: January 28, 2007
- Label: Metatronix
- Tracks: "Intro", "Digital Disko", "Fever", "Interlude 1", "I don't Know (Featuring Jasia 10)"; "Stink"; "Dario"; "Interlude 2"; "My Environments"; "Hard 2 Get"; "Good"

The Outside

- Released: April 8, 2008
- Label: Mush Records
- Tracks: "The Outside", "Opening Ceremony", "The Area", "Best Friends", "Baby Tank", "Beyond the City", "See What It's About", "The Meaning", "The Interlude", "7 Mile Tunnel", "The Machine And The Wind", "It's Time to Leave"
- Bonus tracks: "It's Time to Leave (Pretty Lights Remix)", "Baby Tank (Leo 123 Remix)", "Best Friends (Can't Say Who Remix)", "The Outside (Mux Mool Remix)", "The Meaning (Kelpe Remix)"

Beamrider

- Released: November 18, 2008
- Label: Old Tacoma Records
- Tracks: "Beamrider", "Sentinel", "Restrictor Shield"
- Bonus tracks: "Beams Reprise"

Peace Love Weed 3D

- Released: January 27, 2009
- Format: CD and digital release
- Label: Old Tacoma Records
- Tracks: "Yeah", "Proceed", "Sentinel", "P.L.W.3-D", "So Stoked", "Calling Me", "Glowstick", "Sand Castle", "Laser Cave", "Beamrider"
- Bonus tracks: "So Stoked You're Calling Me (Obey City)", "Yeah" (Big Gigantic Remix)"

Shark Wolf Rabbit Snake

- Released: May 22, 2012
- Format: CD, digital, and LP release
- Label: Pretty Lights Music
- Tracks: "Alive", "Mountain", "The Sunset", "The Shark", "Sneakin' (Baby Part 1)". "Fly Away (Baby Part 2)", "The Wolf", "Gettin' Money (Featuring Michal Menert)", "The Time is Right", "The Rabbit", "On N' On", "Tonight", "The Snake", "The Chase"

Watch the Shadows

- Released: October 14, 2013
- Label: Pretty Lights Music
- Tracks: "Watch the Shadows", "Still Life", "The Western (Featuring Cherub)", "Future Forest", "The Air", "Ain't No Guarantee", "Temporary Residence", "Fresh (Featuring Supervision)", "Like a Ghost", "Strangers"
- Bonus tracks: "Dark One"

Skywave

- Released: June 23, 2017
- Label: Young Heavy Souls
- Tracks: "I Told Ya", "Sun Comes Out", "Not Quite Awake (Emancipator Remix)", "Joyride", "Reflection", "Tides", "Spiders", "Advance", "Rise Fall Rise"

Pure Wilderness (with MZG)

- Released: October 4, 2019
- Label: Old Tacoma Records
- Singles: "Pure Wilderness"

Encounters

- Released: November 11, 2022
- Label: Young Heavy Souls
- Tracks: "Young Alpine", "Turtle Party II", "Free!", "Know By Now", "Guitar Maniacs", "Lay Down", "Mystic Encounters", "Melt Lemon Drops", "Diner Thursdays", "The Lowdown", "Piano Maniacs", "Thanks", "Back In The Day", "Prospect (feat. Jasia 10)", "Waterloo", "Understanding Science"

=== Collaborations ===
With John Hughes, Leo 123, and Jasia 10

- Wanna Be Neuro (single, 2006, Hefty Records)

With Jasia 10

- How We Do: Moves Made (LP, 2011, Old Tacoma Records)

With Leo 123

- Possibilities Remix on Artifact: Perspectives by Sound Tribe Sector 9 (single, 2005, System Recordings)

With various artists

- Hefty Naked Ninja Remix on collaborated album History is Bunk Pt. 1: Collaborations, Reinterpretations & New Compositions (single, 2006, Hefty Records
- Heat on collaborated album History is Bunk Pt. 2: Collaborations, Reinterpretations & New Compositions (single, 2006, Hefty Records

With Bass Physics

- Best of Luck (single, 2018, Mush Records

=== Collaborative Groups ===
As Galaxy Toobin' with Willie Burns

- S/T (LP, 2008, Not Not Fun Records)

As Dark Party with Leo 123

- Light Years (LP, 2010, Old Tacoma Records)

As Minutes Unlimited with Michna

- Making Contact (EP, 2018, Young Heavy Souls)
- Simple Solutions (EP, 2018)
- Firewall Breach (EP, 2018)
- Green Data (LP, 2019, Rellman Enterprises)
- I.D.E.N.T.I.T.Y. (debut studio album, 2020)
- Marantz Files (LP, 2020)
- Gang (EP, 2020)
- Solve (unreleased track, 2020)

As AUBURN with vyle

- T/E/L/E/X (LP, 2011, Pretty Lights and Tekheartsyou)

As Lipphead with Blockhead

- Lipphead (EP, 2019, Young Heavy Souls)
- In The Nude (LP, 2022, Young Heavy Souls)
- From The Back (LP, 2023, Young Heavy Souls)
