= Dust (Ellen Allien album) =

Studio album by Ellen Allien
- Released: May 17, 2010
- Genres: Techno, electronica
- Length: 45:51
- Label: BPitch Control
- Producers: Ellen Allien and AGF

Ellen Allien chronology
| Sool (2008) | Dust (2010) | LISm (2013) |

Dust is the seventh full-length album by German electronic producer Ellen Allien.

== Track listing ==
1. "Our Utopie" - 4:11
2. "Flashy Flashy" - 4:23
3. "My Tree" - 3:48
4. "Sun the Rain" - 4:27
5. "Should We Go Home" - 6:54
6. "Ever" - 6:10
7. "You" - 2:50
8. "Dream" - 4:27
9. "Huibuh" - 4:33
10. "Schlumi" - 4:08

== Reception ==
Professional ratings
Review scores
| Source | Rating |
|---|---|
| Clash (magazine) | 7/10 stars |
| Wears The Trousers Magazine | 3/10 stars |
