= Building Something Beautiful for Me =

Studio album by Loraine James
- Released: 7 October 2022
- Genre: Electronic
- Length: 43:41
- Label: Phantom Limb
- Producer: Loraine James

Loraine James chronology
Whatever the Weather (2022)	Building Something Beautiful for Me (2022)	Gentle Confrontation (2023)

Building Something Beautiful for Me is the fourth album by London-based electronic musician Loraine James, released on 7 October 2022 through Phantom Limb. It was conceived as an homage to the works of composer Julius Eastman and received acclaim from critics.

== Background ==
The album is both an homage and response to the work of composer Julius Eastman, with the parenthetical subtitles of the songs referencing various works by Eastman, namely "Stay on It", "Crazy Nigger", "Femenine" and "The Holy Presence of Joan d'Arc".

== Critical reception ==
Professional ratings
Aggregate scores
Source	Rating
Metacritic	78/100
Review scores
Source	Rating
Clash	9/10
Mojo	4/5 stars
Pitchfork	6.9/10
The Skinny	3/5 stars
Uncut	7/10

Building Something Beautiful for Me received a score of 78 out of 100 on review aggregator Metacritic based on seven critics' reviews, indicating "generally favorable" reception. Mojo wrote that "James's reputation as one of electronic music's most daring, inquisitive artists grows record by record", and The Wire opined that it is "unmistakeably a Loraine James record – the synths are capacious and the beats are intricately counterintuitive – but Eastman's work has clearly been generative". Uncut stated that James's "light, airy palette, punctuated by arresting stabs and scattershot rhythm, is informed by vintage Squarepusher and Plaid – but Eastman's pioneering work as a black, gay musician operating in challenging times clearly resonates with James".

Reviewing the album for The Quietus, Claire Sawers described Building Something Beautiful for Me as an "at times stunning electronic album that continues [Eastman's] radical, minimal legacy, while Anglifying some of his messages" as it is "a gentler listen by comparison" although "with some anger still there". Clash's Lee Wakefield remarked that it "finds Loraine innovating once again, inspired by the composer Julius Eastman and his tragic passing", elaborating that "out of devastation, Loraine has pieced together an album to cherish".

Joe Creely of The Skinny wrote that the album "fares far better the further it strays from replicating Eastman's work", concluding that it "feels like something of a minor work in James's already imposing output, but remains a pointer to both her and Eastman's sparkling talents". Pitchfork's Jayson Greene felt that James "appears more interested in weightless washes of tone, often drifting and beat-free, which is a curious approach for Eastman's work, particularly because it fails to illuminate much about what James found in it".

== Track listing ==
Building Something Beautiful for Me track listing
No.	Title	Length
1.	"Maybe If I (Stay on It)"	3:56
2.	"The Perception of Me (Crazy Nigger)"	8:34
3.	"Choose to Be Gay (Femenine)"	7:09
4.	"Building Something Beautiful for Me (Holy Presence of Joan d'Arc)"	2:46
5.	"Enfield, Always"	6:08
6.	"My Take"	5:08
7.	"Black Excellence (Stay on It)"	5:04
8.	"What Now (Prelude to the Holy Presence of Joan d'Arc)"	4:56
Total length:		43:41

== Charts ==
Chart performance for Building Something Beautiful for Me
Chart (2022)	Peak position
UK Album Downloads (OCC)	52
