= Sool (album) =

Studio album by Ellen Allien
- Released: 27 May 2008
- Genre: Minimal techno, IDM
- Length: 52:48
- Label: BPitch Control
- Producer: Ellen Allien and AGF

Ellen Allien chronology
Orchestra of Bubbles (2006)	Sool (2008)	Dust (2010)

Professional ratings
Review scores
Source	Rating
AllMusic	3.5/5 stars
No Ripcord	9/10
Pitchfork	8.0/10
Tiny Mix Tapes	3.5/5 stars

Sool is the sixth studio album by German electronic musician Ellen Allien, released on her BPitch Control music label on 27 May 2008. The album was produced by Allien and fellow German artist Antye Greie (AGF).

== Track listing ==
1. "Einsteigen" – 3:08
2. "Caress" – 4:29
3. "Bim" – 5:30
4. "Sprung" – 4:59
5. "Elphine" – 4:48
6. "Zauber" – 4:44
7. "Its" – 6:43
8. "Ondu" – 4:26
9. "Frieda" - 4:29
10. "MM" - 4:51
11. "Out" - 4:44
