= Foodman =

Electronic music producer and DJ

- Also known as: Shokuhin Maturi, 食品まつり
- Born: Takahide Higuchi; Japan
- Origin: Nagoya, Japan
- Genres: Electronic, footwork, juke, experimental music
- Occupations: Musician, record producer, disc jockey, painter
- Years active: 2011–present
- Labels: Orange Milk, Palto Flats, Hyperdub

Takahide Higuchi is a Japanese electronic producer, disc jockey and painter who works under the pseudonym Foodman. He has been releasing music since 2011 and is based in Yokohama. His work first gained traction in the early 2010s when he was recognised as a leading name in Japan's footwork and juke scene; the producer has continued to see his work as rooted in footwork. According to Resident Advisor, the musician's work blends different electronic genres, including juke and footwork but also ambient, techno, house and noise music, yet dissecting these styles and morphing them together "then driven to extreme without giving you a second to come up with a definitive genre." The Vinyl Factory consider him to be an experimental musician.

An article for The Japan Times revealed more influences on Foodman's music. From spending a year on Ishigaki as a child — where his mother is from — he believes "the smell, the temperature, the tone of the sanshin (a three-stringed Okinawan instrument) played by my grandpa and grandma" may have resulted in his "tropical or soft, bright tone". The same article also states Foodman's first experience of making electronic music was via the 1996 PlayStation title Fluid (video game).

The musician has released albums on Orange Milk with artwork designed by owner Giant Claw. Foodman's 2016 album Ez Minzoku features off-kilter footwork rhythms and electronic horns, woodwinds and flutes. It was named one of "The 20 Best Experimental Albums of 2016" by Pitchfork. The 2017 single "Nanika" was hailed by Pitchfork for its erratic yet dance-based structure. That same year, the producer recorded a DJ mix for i-D. In November 2018, he released Moriyama, his first album for the Palto Flats label.

== Discography ==
- Shokuhin (2012)
- 「IROIRO」 (2013)
- Drum Desu (2014)
- Ez Minzoku (2016)
- Aru Otoko No Densetsu (2018)
- ODOODO (2019)
- Dokutsu (2020)
- Yasuragi Land (2021)
- HIKARIGASASHIKOMU (2026)
