= Stadtkind =

Studio album by Ellen Allien
- Released: 2001
- Genre: Techno/Electro
- Label: BPitch Control

Ellen Allien chronology
Stadtkind (2001)	Weiss Mix (2002)

Professional ratings
Review scores
Source	Rating
AllMusic	3.5/5 stars

Stadtkind is the debut album by German experimental techno musician Ellen Allien. Released on Allien's own label, BPitch Control in 2001, it was an homage to the city of Berlin, whose post-reunification culture inspired the work. The album's title means "city child" in German.

== Track listing ==
1. "Send" – 6:27
2. "Fensterbrettmusik" – 5:19
3. "Tief in Mir" – 5:05
4. "Stadtkind" – 5:14
5. "Shorty" – 3:40
6. "Funkenflug der Träume" – 4:21
7. "Salzsee" – 4:30
8. "Licht" – 5:03
9. "Wolken Ziehen" – 5:30
10. "Trust And ..." – 3:20
11. "Data Romance" – 4:02
