= Pulseprogramming =

Pulseprogramming is an American electronic musical group and multimedia art project founded by Marc Hellner and Joel Kriske in Portland, Oregon in 1998. The band is currently centered on Marc Hellner and new member Chanel Pease. It has also included art directors John Schacter and Hans Seeger, video artist Eric David Johnson (DJ Bunny Ears), and poet Joel Craig. The collective began releasing intelligent dance music on Chicago label Aesthetics in 1999 and followed with releases on the same label in 2001 and 2003. The 2003 release Tulsa for One Second was described by Pitchfork Media as "Lap-pop".

In the years after Hellner and Kriske parted ways, Hellner released a record entitled Marriages enlisting production team Telefon Tel Aviv. The album was released by Peacefrog Records on August 23, 2005.

== Releases ==
- Pulseprogramming (CD/LP) Aesthetics 1999
- 1 Of 2 In 1000 (LP) Aesthetics 2001
- 2 Of 2 In 1000 (LP) Aesthetics 2001
- Split (12") Outward Music Company (OMCO) 2002
- Tulsa For One Second (CD/LP) Aesthetics 2003
- Tulsa For One Second Remix Project (CD/LP) Aesthetics 2005
- Marc Hellner 'Marriages' (CD/LP) Peacefrog 2005
- 'PLAY' Original Score L'Avventura Films 2005
- From Nowhere Near (Original Scores for Film/TV) Form Music 2007
- Charade is Gold (LP, Digi) Audraglint 2011

Remixes

- The Awkwardness EP (CD, Maxi) I Change.C? (Pulseprog... Aesthetics 2001
- Harvest Remixes (CD, Album, Dig) Gymnopedie #1 (Pulse P... Victor Entertainment Japan 2004

Tracks Appear On

- OMCO Compilation (CD/LP) Mozzer, Test Tubes/Tin... Outward Music Company (OMCO) 1997
- Installation:04 (CD) Detroitmembrings Masstransfer 2000
- Compiled (CD) Oh' Halo (1894 Penny ... Aesthetics 2001
- The Wire Tapper 7 (CD) To The Expert Eye Alone Wire Magazine 2001
- The Wire Tapper 9 (2xCD) Blooms Eventually Wire Magazine 2002
- Mind The Gap Volume 44 (CD) Blooms Eventually Gonzo Circus 2003
- Nova Tunes 08 (CD) Blooms Eventually Nova Records 2003
- Politronics (CD) Suck Or Run (Schneider... Onitor 2003
- Sónar 2003 (2xCD) Off To Do Showery Snap... Mute Records Ltd. 2003
- Wir_kommen_in_frieden (CD, Smplr, Comp, Promo) Off To Do Showery Snap... Persona Non Grata, Aesthetics 2003
- Reconfigures (CD) Suck Or Run (Schneider... Earsugar 2004)
