= Joseph Desler Costa =

American photographer

Joseph Desler Costa is a photographer and musician born (1981) in Pittsburgh, Pennsylvania. Costa is a member of the indie music group L'Altra and has released music under the names Young Boy and Costa Music. Costa has released records with Saint Marie Records, Acuarela, Aesthetics, Hefty, Is Collage Collective and Stilll Records. Musical influences have included Love and Rockets, Orchestral Manoeuvres in the Dark, New Order, and Ennio Morricone.

Costa's photographic work has been exhibited in various art spaces, magazines and web publications.

Costa resides in Brooklyn, New York.

== Discography ==
- Young Boy, 'Other Summers' Saint Marie Records, 2014
- L'Altra, 'Telepathic Deluxe Edition' Saint Marie Records, 2013
- L'Altra, 'Telepathic' Acuarela Discos, And records (JP) 2011
- Costa Music, 'Lighter Subjects' Stilll Records (UK, EU) 2008
- Costa Music, 'Lighter Subjects' IsCollageCollective(JAPAN)2007
- Costa/Hellner, 'PLAY' Original Score L'Avventura Films 2006
- L'Altra, 'Different Days' Hefty Records 2005
- L'Altra, 'Bring On Happiness EP' Hefty Records 2005
- L'Altra, 'In The Afternoon' Aesthetics 2002
- L'Altra, 'Ouletta 7"' Aesthetics 2002
- L'Altra, 'Music of a Sinking Occasion' Aesthetics 2000
- L'Altra, 'S/T EP' Aesthetics 1999

== Tracks Appear On ==
- Yeti One Yeti Publishing LLC 2000
- Compiled Aesthetics 2001
- Domino 2001 Ancienne Belgique 2001
- POPvolume#2 POPnews 2001
- VPRO De Avonden XMAS 2001 Amekbelevchrist VPRO 2001
- Acuarela Songs 2 Acuarela Discos 2003
- Sampler 3 Hang Up 2003
- Hefty 10 Digest + Prefuse73Mixtape Hefty Records 2006
- Hefty 10th Anniversary Hefty Records 2006
