= For You and I =

Studio album by Loraine James
- Released: 20 September 2019
- Length: 47:35
- Label: Hyperdub

Loraine James chronology
Detail (2017)	For You and I (2019)	Hmm (2020)

For You and I is the second studio album by English record producer Loraine James. It was released on 20 September 2019 through Hyperdub. It received universal acclaim from critics.

== Background ==
For You and I is a follow-up to Loraine James' debut studio album, Detail (2017). It features guest appearances from rapper Le3 Black (on "London Ting // Dark as Fuck" and "My Future") and singer Theo (on "Sensual"). The album's working title was Disjointed. The album's cover art features a photograph of tower blocks in Ponders End, Enfield, London, where James grew up.

== Critical reception ==
Professional ratings
Aggregate scores
Source	Rating
Metacritic	87/100
Review scores
Source	Rating
AllMusic	4.5/5 stars
Exclaim!	8/10
PopMatters	8/10

According to the review aggregator Metacritic, For You and I received "universal acclaim" based on a weighted average score of 87 out of 100 from 6 critic scores.

Andrew Ryce of Resident Advisor commented that "The LP boils down a generation's worth of London music into a restlessly creative mix of dance music, infused with emotions both celebratory and mournful." Noel Gardner of The Quietus stated, "For You and I is, predominantly, neither high-minded nor solemn: an honest-to-goodness joyous blast of unreasonably pure electronically generated melodies and spindizzy beats pulled from a great many strains of club music."

=== Accolades ===
Year-end lists for For You and I
Publication	List	Rank	Ref.
DJ Mag	Top 50 Albums of 2019	1	
Fact	The Best Albums of 2019	—	
The Line of Best Fit	The Best Albums of 2019	30	
Mixmag	The 50 Best Albums of the Year 2019	4	
PopMatters	The 70 Best Albums of 2019	51	
The Quietus	Quietus Albums of the Year 2019	1	
Resident Advisor	2019's Best Albums	—	

== Track listing ==
For You and I track listing
No.	Title	Length
1.	"Glitch Bitch"	3:12
2.	"London Ting // Dark as Fuck" (featuring Le3 Black)	4:42
3.	"So Scared"	4:26
4.	"Hand Drops"	3:19
5.	"Sensual" (featuring Theo)	5:44
6.	"For You and I"	5:33
7.	"My Future" (featuring Le3 Black)	3:37
8.	"Scraping My Feet"	4:26
9.	"Sick 9"	2:47
10.	"Vowel // Consonant"	6:07
11.	"Words Ears Mouth"	3:19
Total length:		47:35
