= Whatever the Weather II =

Studio album by Whatever the Weather
- Released: 14 March 2025
- Genre: Ambient
- Length: 44:31
- Label: Ghostly International

Whatever the Weather chronology
Gentle Confrontation (2023)	Whatever the Weather II (2025)

Whatever the Weather II is the second studio album by British musician Loraine James under the stage name Whatever the Weather. It was released on 14 March 2025, by Ghostly International.

== Reception ==
Professional ratings
Aggregate scores
Source	Rating
Metacritic	77/100
Review scores
Source	Rating
AllMusic	4/5 stars
Mojo	3/5 stars
Pitchfork	7.9/10

At Metacritic, which assigns a normalized rating out of 100 to reviews from mainstream critics, the album received an average score of 77 based on five reviews, indicating "generally favorable reviews".

The Wire remarked, "Whatever the Weather II showcases James's creativity and technical mastery as much as her capacity for emotional subtlety, depth and warmth."

Uncut Magazine wrote in its review of the album that "it's all fairly dry, but listen closely and its charms emerge." Mojo Magazine stated, "Central to Whatever the Weather II is an underlying hum and crackle that offsets its engrossing sound design."

AllMusic described the album as "another powerfully expressive work." Pitchfork rated the album 7.9 out of ten and noted, "WtWII is more focused, with a palette organized around muted synth pads, minimalist arrangements, and faint dustings of digital distortion."

== Track listing ==
Whatever the Weather II track listing
No.	Title	Length
1.	"1 °C"	1:16
2.	"3 °C"	3:33
3.	"18 °C"	3:54
4.	"20 °C"	6:25
5.	"23 °C (Intermittent Sunshine)"	2:08
6.	"5 °C"	4:36
7.	"8 °C"	4:15
8.	"26 °C"	4:03
9.	"11 °C (Intermittent Rain)"	2:15
10.	"9 °C"	3:40
11.	"15 °C"	3:53
12.	"12 °C"	4:33
Total length:		44:31

== Personnel ==
Credits for Whatever the Weather II adapted from Bandcamp

- Collin Hughes – cover art
- Justin Hunt Sloane – design
- Josh Eustis – mastering
