= Phantom Limb (record label) =

English record label

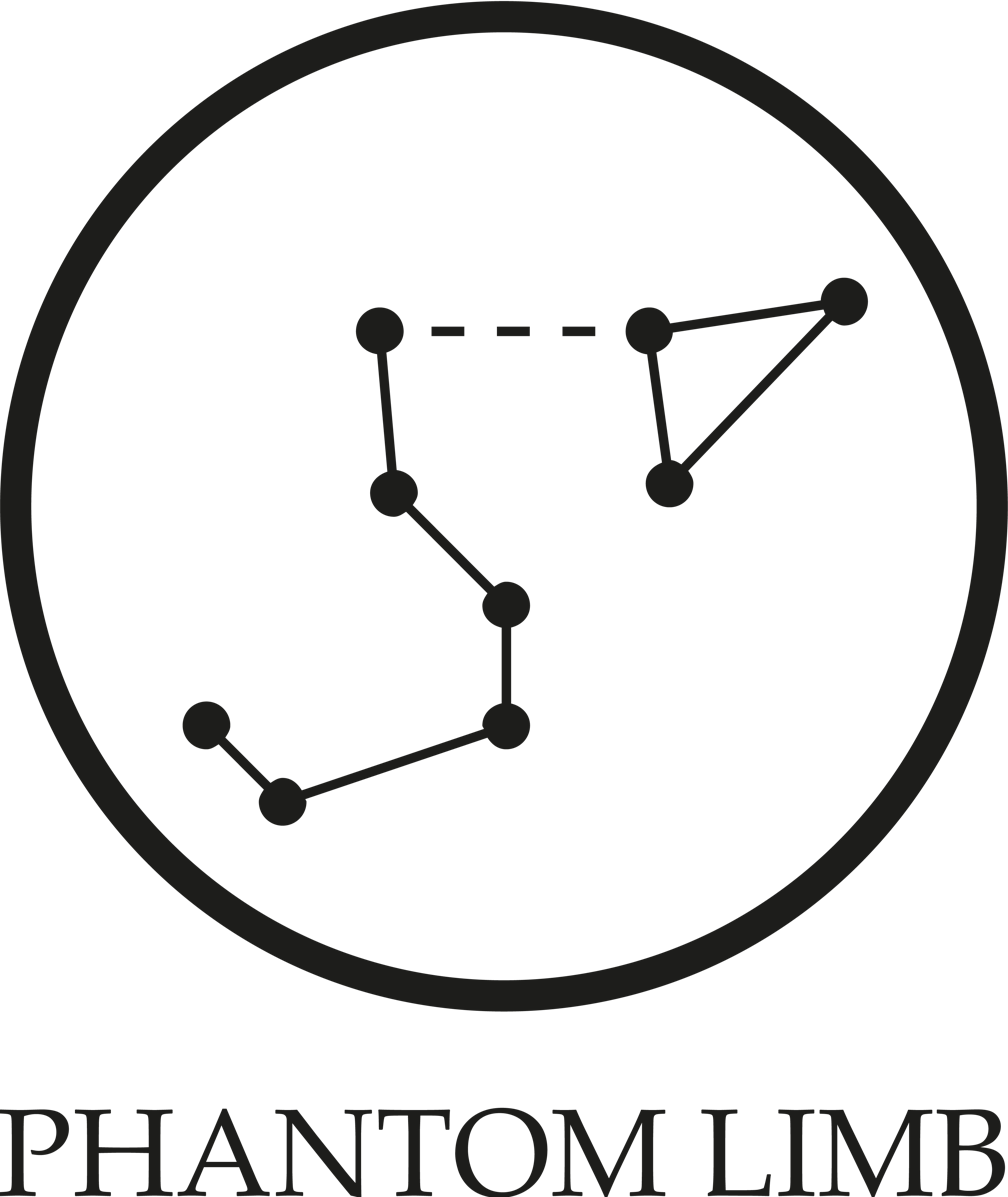
- Founded: 2017
- Distributors: Republic of Music (world ex-North America), Virtual (North America)
- Genre: electronic, experimental
- Country of origin: England
- Location: Brighton
- Official website: phantom-limb.co.uk

Phantom Limb is an independent record label based in Brighton, England, founded in 2017 by James Vella. The label is run by Vella and publicist Ken Li, and focuses on experimental, ambient, and electronic music, but branching as widely as hip-hop, experimental metal, indie, folk and dance music. Their release formats include vinyl, CDs, cassettes, and digital downloads.

Many of the label's releases have received accolades such as records of the day, month, or year by publications such as Bandcamp Daily, The Guardian, and Loud & Quiet.

The organisation also offers music publishing (in partnership with the Wise Music Group) and label services, and has a live agency wing that programmes tours and events for label-affiliated and other artists.

== History ==
=== Background and founding ===
James Vella founded Phantom Limb in 2017 following a long working history in independent music, having set up O Rosa Records in 2006 and Injazero Records (as a consultant) in 2016, and additionally working in A&R and international distribution for FatCat Records from 2008 to 2016. He is also an experienced musician, co-founding the band yndi halda and releasing solo records as A Lily. Vella invited fellow music industry professionals Ken Li (formerly of Thrill Jockey) and George Clift (director of the Hot Salvation record store, record label, and distributor) to join Phantom Limb. On its inauguration, Phantom Limb Touring - the organisation's live agency - was headed by Andrew Halliday, who left the company in 2023 and was replaced by Tommy de Nys. Former Mute Records Director of A&R Dean Wengrow joined in 2022 to run the company's label services division Five Worlds.

=== Notable releases ===
Phantom Limb have released music by artists such as Kevin Richard Martin, Loraine James, Richard Skelton, WaqWaq Kingdom, Dylan Henner, A Lily, Suso Saíz, Norman McLaren, KMRU, Iggor Cavalera, Machinefabriek, Senyawa, MC Yallah, 食品まつり a.k.a foodman and others. The Loraine James album Building Something Beautiful For Me was an "artistic response" to the works of NYC composer Julius Eastman, a project conceived by Vella and performed at London's Southbank Centre with the London Contemporary Orchestra. Kevin Richard Martin's two releases with Phantom Limb have been a rescore to the Soviet cinema piece Solaris by Andrei Tarkovsky and a collaboration with Kenyan musician KMRU. In late 2024, Phantom Limb released the compositions of Canadian animator Norman McLaren, making them publicly available for the first time.

=== Series ===
Phantom Limb's series include Spirituals, a digital-only imprint focussing on ambient and experimental music from around the world, with contributors as far flung as Georgia, South Korea, Nigeria, Taiwan, Iran, and Colombia.

Their Sun Language imprint exclusively releases reissues of works originally released in earlier periods, such as the Venezuelan electronic solo artist Miguel Noya and his works from the 1980's, Japanese musician K. Yoshimatsu and his home-recorded cassette albums originally released from 1981 to 1985, experimental poet Ellen Zweig and her spoken word recordings, and Aztec New Age duo Xochimoki, whose records were self-released in the early 1980's.

Geist im Kino is a soundtrack imprint, generally releasing film scores such as the soundtrack to 2022 Maltese movie Luzzu by The War on Drugs' Jon Natchez, but also including soundtracks to television productions, dance, theatre, ballet. With its Imaginal Soundtracking sub-series, Geist im Kino also releases rescores to older film works such as those by Kihachiro Kawamoto and Nazim Tulyakhodzayev.

=== Events ===
In 2022, celebrating their fifth anniversary, the label was extensively documented by online platforms such as Bleep, Carhartt Work in Progress, HHV, The Ransom Note, Threads Radio and others. In 2023, to celebrate the anniversary, Phantom Limb curated a series of concerts in London and Amsterdam, including the Dutch premiere of Loraine James' tribute to Julius Eastman.

== Record label ==
- Hekla
- OHYUNG
- Infinity Knives
- Brian Ennals
- Loraine James
- Richard Skelton
- Kevin Richard Martin
- KMRU
- Norman McLaren
- A Lily
- Tape Loop Orchestra
- Cameron Graham
- Maroulita de Kol
- Milo Korbenski
- Xochimoki
- Paul Schütze
- Ellen Zweig
- Miguel Noya
- Dylan Henner
- SABIWA
- Ibukun Sunday
- Jan Esbra
- WaqWaq Kingdom
- Sachi Kobayashi
- Eamon Ivri
- Dau
- 99LETTERS
- myst milano.
- Ami Dang
- Pram of Dogs
- Aria Rostami
- Beqa Ungiadze
- Brady Cohan
- Chloe Kim 김예지
- Imryll
- Jon Natchez
- Swordman Kitala
- Suso Saíz
- Machinefabriek
- 食品まつり a.k.a foodman
- Senyawa
- Ueda Takayasu
- Humbros
- MC Yallah
- Miguel Noya
- Bryan Senti

== Touring ==
- Colleen
- OHYUNG
- William Tyler
- Elaine Howley
- Lisa Kohl
- Six Organs of Admittance
- Roy Montgomery
- Matchess
- Winged Wheel
- Joy Guidry
- Bryan Senti
- Steve Shelley, Bill Orcutt, Ethan Miller
- Penelope Trappes
- Damian Dalle Torre
- Calcutá
- Pierre Bastien
- Dylan Henner
- Hekla
- myst milano.
- Steve Gunn
- Mary Lattimore
- Josephine Foster
- Jeremiah Chiu & Marta Sofia Honer
- Deb Googe (my bloody valentine)
- Carl Stone
- Ka Baird
- Laila Sakini / Princess Diana of Wales
- Natural Wonder Beauty Concept
- Ana Roxanne
- Gyda Valtysdottir
- Merope
- Setting
- Thurston Moore
- Brigid Mae Power
- Tristan Allen
- Andrew Pekler
- Ghostmass
- Milo Korbenski

== Music publishing ==
- Nailah Hunter
- Richard Skelton
- Roger Robinson
- myst milano
- Meitei
- Aaron Martin
- Aisha Orazbayeva
- Kin Leonn
- Taz Modi
- Wilson Trouvé
- Dylan Henner
- yndi halda

== See also ==
- List of independent record labels
