= Marina Herlop =

Catalan experimental musician (born 1992)

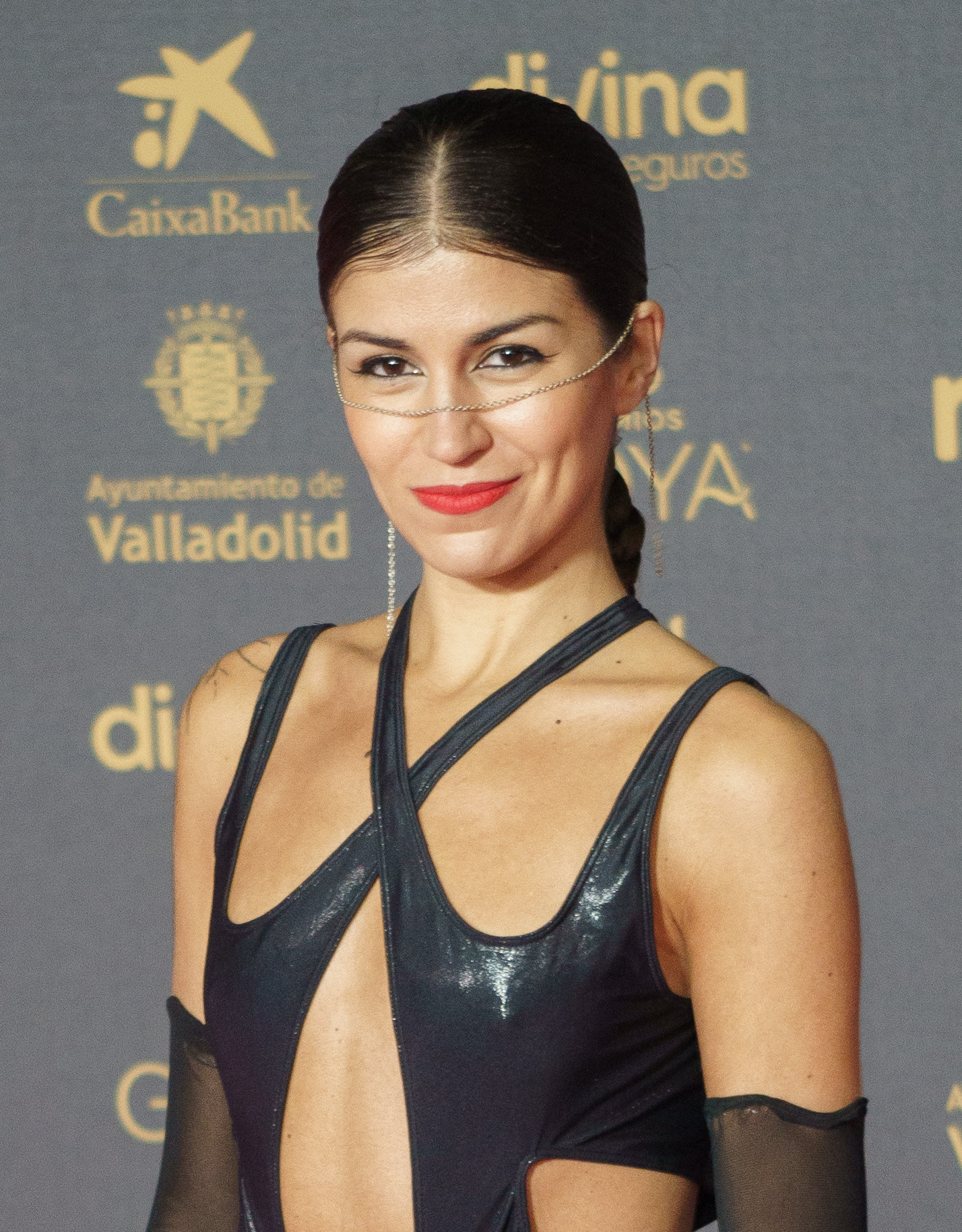

Background information
- Born: Piera, Anoia, Catalonia, Spain
- Genres: Electronic; avant-garde; folk; classical
- Instruments: Piano; vocals
- Years active: 2016–present
- Labels: Aloud Music; PAN
- Member of: Myōboku
- Website: marinaherlop.bandcamp.com

Marina Hernández López (born 1992), known professionally as Marina Herlop, is a Catalan pianist, singer, and experimental musician. She is known for her fusion of classical and avant-garde styles in her music. Herlop uses an invented language in her lyrics, mixing elements from existing languages and her own constructed vocabulary.

== History ==
Herlop is a classically trained pianist. She released her debut album in 2016 titled Nanook. Herlop released her second album in 2018 titled Babasha. Herlop's third album, Pripyat, was released in 2022 through PAN Records. The album received critical acclaim and an 8.0 out of 10 from Pitchfork.

On 1 September 2023, Herlop announced her fourth album, Nekkuja, which was then released on 27 October via PAN. On the same day, she released the album's lead single, "La Alhambra", and announced tour dates in Europe and North America for September through December.

In July 2026, she released "Jaque" as the lead single for her album Dja Dja, which was released on October 9, 2026.

== Discography ==
- Nanook (Aloud Music, 2016)
- Babasha (Aloud Music, 2018)
- Pripyat (PAN, 2022)
- Nekkuja (PAN, 2023)
- Dja Dja (Marina Herlop, 2026)

=== with Òscar Garrobé as Myōboku ===
- Myōboku (Foehn, 2020)
- Vas volant (Foehn, 2021)
