= Ellen Allien =

German electronic musician, music producer

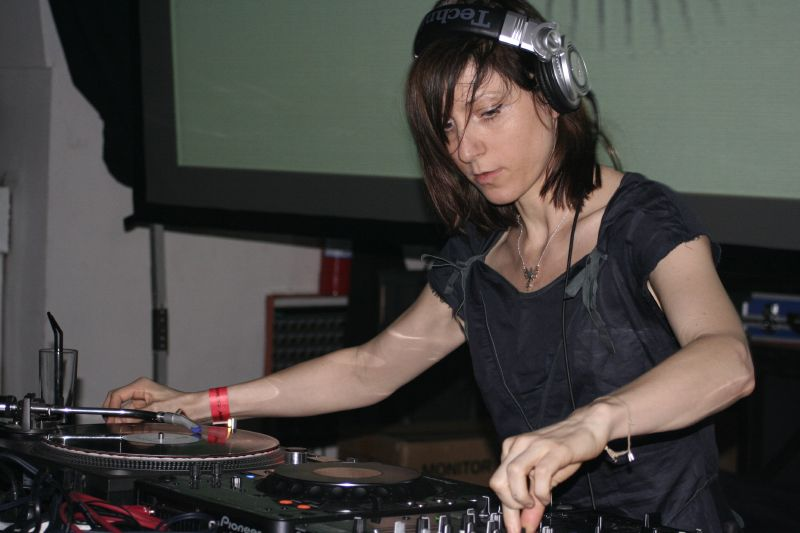
- Ellen Allien in 2006

Background information
- Born: Ellen Fraatz
- Origin: West Berlin, West Germany
- Genres: Experimental techno; techno; IDM; tech house
- Occupations: Vocalist; remixer; producer
- Instrument: Vocals
- Years active: 1992–present
- Labels: BPitch Control; Spectral Sound
- Website: ellenallien.de

Ellen Fraatz, known professionally as Ellen Allien, is a Berlin-based German electronic musician, music producer, and the founder of BPitch Control music label. Her album Stadtkind was dedicated to the city of Berlin, and she cites the culture of reunified Berlin as one of the main inspirations for her music. She sings in both German and English. Her music is best described as a blend of IDM and techno music, which is dance-floor oriented and has noticeable experimental elements.

== Career ==
Ellen Allien was born on September 16, 1968 and grew up in West Berlin. During 1989, she lived in London where she first came into contact with electronic music. When she later returned to Berlin, electronic music had become increasingly popular in Germany. In 1992, she became resident DJ at the Bunker, Tresor, and E-Werk. She started her own show on the Berlin radio station Kiss FM and created her own record label, calling them both "Braincandy". Due to problems with distribution, she gave the Braincandy label up in 1997 and instead began organizing parties with the name, "Pitch Control".

She released her first album, Stadtkind, in 2001, and her second album, Berlinette, in 2003. In 2005, she released the album Thrills, followed by Orchestra of Bubbles, a collaboration with Apparat, in 2006. During the same year, Allien launched her own fashion line, "Ellen Allien Fashion".

After the minimalistic Sool in 2008, she released her fifth solo album, Dust, in 2010.

Allien made a brief appearance in the 2009 electronic music documentary Speaking In Code. Then she worked on the music for the dance performance "Drama Per Musica", which has been premiered in Paris in March 2011 under the direction of Alexandre Roccoli and Sevérine Rième. An accompanying album "LISm" was released in 2013. It has been described as a homogeneous mix of various genres, akin to her DJ sets. Her next album "Nost" also sets on variety, but only within the electronic spectrum. In 2019 Ellen Allien launched her UFO Inc. label with her "UFO" acid techno EP.

Ellen Allien holds residencies in the clubs Nitsa, Barcelona and Circoloco at DC10, Ibiza. In 2019 she launched her bi-monthly rave "We Are Not Alone" at Griessmühle, Berlin, Upon the venue's shutdown in 2020, the event has been moved to RSO.berlin.

== Record labels ==
Allien created the techno label BPitch Control in 1999. Earlier in her career, around the time she hosted 'Braincandy' on Berlin's Kiss-FM, she launched her first record label name using the same name, this paved the way for the BPitch Control imprint. The label has launched the careers of popular artists, such as Modeselektor, Paul Kalkbrenner and Apparat. In 2005 Allien created a BPitch sublabel called "Memo Musik" for minimal tech and minimal house.

== Discography ==
=== Albums ===
- 2001 – Stadtkind (BPC021)
- 2003 – Berlinette (BPC065)
- 2004 – Remix Collection (BPC080)
- 2005 – Thrills (BPC106)
- 2006 – Orchestra of Bubbles (BPC125) with Apparat
- 2008 – Sool (BPC175)
- 2010 – Dust (BPC217)
- 2013 – LISm (BPC264)
- 2017 – Nost (BPC330)
- 2019 – Alientronic (BPX001)
- 2020 – AurAA (BPX009)
- 2026 – New Life (BPX053)

=== EPs / singles ===
- 1995 – "Ellen Allien E.P." (XAMP03)
- 1995 – "Ellen Allien Vol. II [Yellow Sky]" (MFS7074-0)
- 1997 – "Be Wild" (BRAINCANDY002)
- 1997 – "Rockt Krieger" (BRAINCANDY003)
- 2000 – "Last Kiss '99" (BPC008)
- 2000 – "Dataromance" (BPC013)
- 2001 – "Dataromance" (Remixes) (BPC029)
- 2001 – "Stadtkind" (Remixes) (BPC030)
- 2002 – "Erdbeermund" (BPC041)
- 2003 – "Trash Scapes" (Remixes) (BPC066)
- 2003 – "Alles Sehen" (Remixes) (BPC073)
- 2004 – "Astral" (BPC085)
- 2005 – "Magma" (BPC105)
- 2005 – "Your Body Is My Body" (BPC113)
- 2006 – "Just A Man/Just A Woman" (with Audion) (SPC36)
- 2006 – "Down" (Remixes) (BPC116)
- 2006 – "Turbo Dreams" (BPC124)
- 2006 – "Way Out" (Remixes) (BPC129)
- 2006 – "Jet" (Remixes) (BPC135)
- 2007 – "Go" (BPC160)
- 2008 – "Sprung / Its" (BPC176)
- 2008 – "Out Remixes" (BPC178)
- 2008 – "Elphine Remixes" (BPC181)
- 2008 – "Ondu / Caress" (BPC186)
- 2009 – "Lover" (BPC199)
- 2010 – "Pump" (BPC209)
- 2010 – "Flashy Flashy" (BPC216)
- 2011 – "Dust (remixes)" EP (BPC232)
- 2014 – "Freak" EP (BPC300)
- 2015 – "Allien RMXS" (BPC313)
- 2015 – "High" (BPC315)
- 2016 – "Turn Off Your Mind" (BPC324)
- 2016 – "Landing XX" (BPC328)
- 2018 – "Take A Stand" (NONPLUS064)
- 2019 – "Ufo" (UFO INC001)
- 2019 – "La Música Es Dios" (UFO INC003)
- 2020 - "Auraa"
- 2021 - "Rosen EP"
- 2023 - "Dance And Kill" with Ash Code

=== Mix CDs ===
- 2001 – Flieg mit Ellen Allien ("Fly with Ellen Allien")
- 2002 – Weiss.Mix ("White mix")
- 2004 – My Parade
- 2007 – Fabric 34: Ellen Allien
- 2007 – Time Out Presents – The Other Side: Berlin
- 2007 – Bpitch Control Camping Compilation 03
- 2008 – Boogybytes, vol. 04
- 2010 – Watergate 05
- 2011 – On The Road Mix (Bpitch Control) – For the German issue of DJMag

=== Remixes ===
- 1996 – Gut-Humpe – "Butterpump (Ellen Allien rmx)"
- 1996 – Gut-Humpe – "Butter (Ellen Allien dub)"
- 2001 – Malaria! – "Eifersucht (Ellen Allien rmx)"
- 2001 – Miss Kittin & Goldenboy – "Rippin Kittin (Ellen Allien rmx)"
- 2001 – PeterLicht – "Die Transsylvanische Verwandte Ist Da (Ellen Allien Fun Maniac mix)"
- 2002 – Covenant – "Bullet (Ellen Allien rmx)"
- 2003 – Apparat – "Koax (Ellen Allien rmx)"
- 2003 – Barbara Morgenstern – "Aus Heiterem Himmel (Ellen Allien rmx)"
- 2003 – OMR – "The Way We Have Chosen (Ellen Allien rmx)"
- 2003 – Sascha Funke – "Forms And Shapes (Ellen Allien rmx)"
- 2003 – Vicknoise – "Chromosoma 23 (Ellen Allien rmx)"
- 2004 – Gold Chains – "Let's Get It On (Ellen Allien rmx)"
- 2004 – Miss Yetti – "Marguerite (Ellen Allien rmx)"
- 2004 – Neulander – "Sex, God + Money (Ellen Allien rmx)"
- 2005 – George Thompson – "Laid Back Snack Attack (Ellen Allien Via mix)"
- 2006 – Audion – "Just A Man (Ellen Allien rmx)"
- 2007 – Beck – "Cellphone's Dead (Ellen Allien rmx)"
- 2007 – Louderbach – "Season 6 (Ellen Allien Away rmx)"
- 2007 – Safety Scissors – "Where Is Germany And How Do I Get There (Ellen Allien Germany rmx)"
- 2009 – Uffie – "Pop The Glock (Ellen Allien Bang The Glock Mix 2009)"
- 2010 – We Love – "Hide Me (Ellen Allien Remix)" (BPitch Control)
- 2011 – Moderat – "Seamonkey (Ellen Allien Remix)" (BPitch Control)
- 2011 – AUX 88 – "Real To Reel (Ellen Allien Remix)" (Puzzlebox Records)
- 2012 – Telefon Tel Aviv – "The Birds (Ellen Allien Remix)" (BPitch Control)
- 2014 – Shinedoe – "Panomanic (Ellen Allien Remix)" (Intacto Records)
- 2017 – Skinnerbox – "Gender (Ellen Allien Remix)" (Turbo)
- 2017 – Depeche Mode - "Cover me (Ellen Allien U.F.O. Remix)" (Mute Records)
- 2018 – Mount Kimbie - "T.A.M.E.D. (Ellen Allien U.F.O. Rmx)" (Warp Records)
- 2019 – Loco Dice - "We're Alive (Ellen Allien About XX Remix)" (Desolat)
- 2019 – Shlømo - "Mercurial Skin (Ellen Allien Remix)" (Taapion Records)
- 2020 – Amotik - "Tetalis (Ellen Allien Remix)" (AMOTIK)
