= Joshua Eustis =

American musician and producer

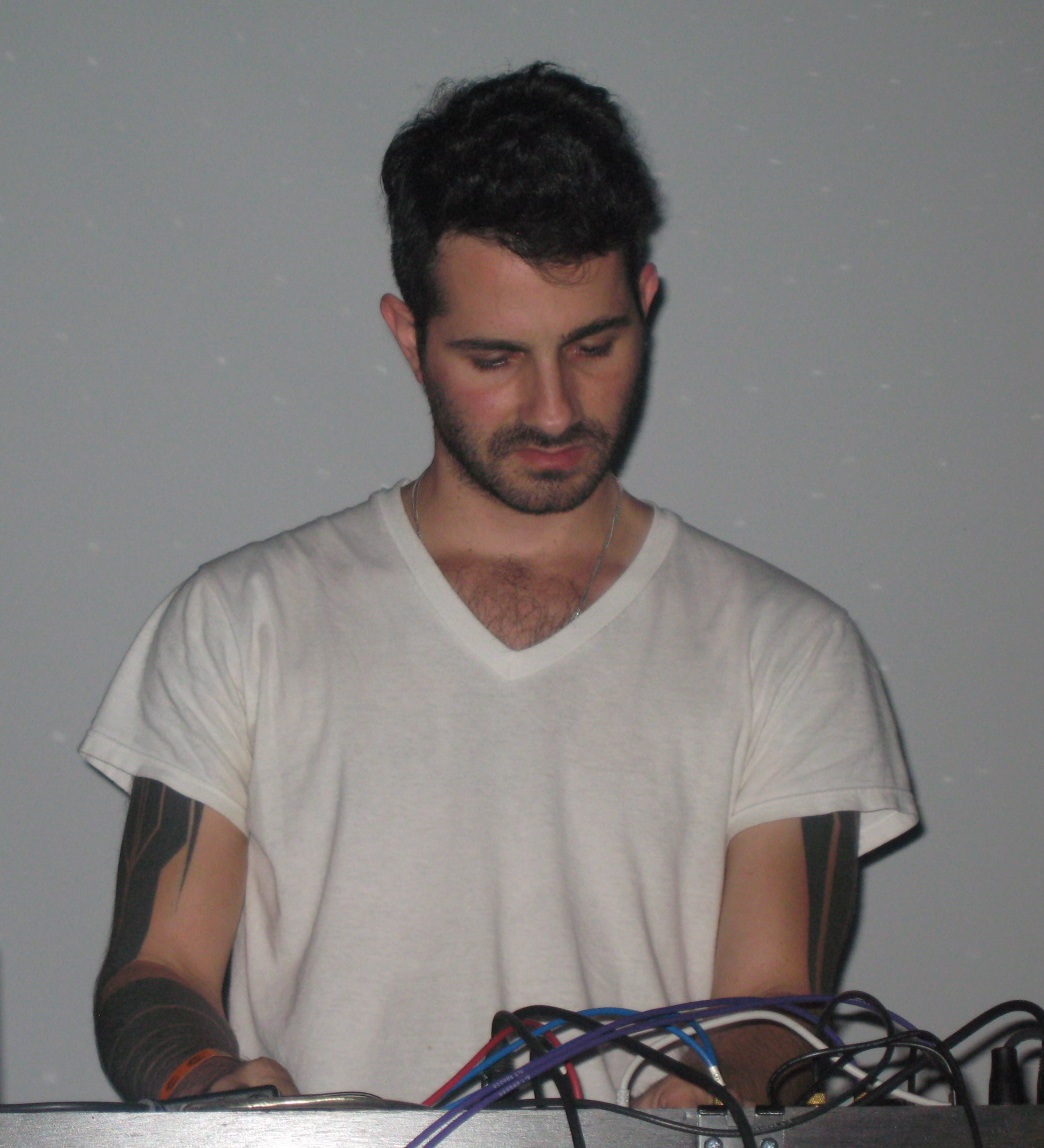
- Joshua Eustis performing with Telefon Tel Aviv in 2009

Background information
- Also known as: Sons of Magdalene
- Born: Joshua Leeds Eustis; July 16, 1977 (age 48)
- Origin: New Orleans, Louisiana, U.S.
- Genres: IDM; electronica; glitch; ambient; industrial rock
- Occupations: Musician; singer-songwriter; record producer
- Instruments: Vocals; keyboards; bass; guitar; saxophone; erhu; drums
- Years active: 1999–present
- Labels: Hefty; BPitch Control; Audraglint; Ghostly International
- Website: telefontelaviv.com

Joshua Leeds Eustis is an American musician, singer-songwriter, and record producer, best known as the current sole member of the electronic music act Telefon Tel Aviv, since the death of bandmate Charles Cooper in 2009. He served as a touring member for the industrial rock band Nine Inch Nails in 2013, and he has collaborated heavily over the years with Maynard James Keenan's project Puscifer, for which he also served as a touring member. Eustis' solo project is Sons of Magdalene, launched in 2008. He is also a founding member of the band the Black Queen.

== Biography ==
Eustis' formative influences included the early 1980s electronic bands Depeche Mode, OMD, Secret Service, the Human League and Talk Talk. He formed Telefon Tel Aviv with high school friend Charles Cooper in 1999. The duo released their debut album, Fahrenheit Fair Enough, in 2001 through Hefty Records. This was followed by Map of What Is Effortless in 2004 and Immolate Yourself in 2009. On January 22, 2009, Charles Cooper died, leaving the future of Telefon Tel Aviv uncertain.

In 2011, Eustis co-produced Puscifer's second studio album, Conditions of My Parole. He also contributed to Puscifer's Donkey Punch the Night EP and All Re-Mixed Up remix album in 2013. In 2013, it was announced that Eustis would perform as a live member of Nine Inch Nails for the Tension 2013 tour. He mainly took the bass duties during the early tour, due to bassist Eric Avery's departure from the band. After bassist Pino Palladino's inclusion to the new line-up, he performed mainly on guitar, keyboards and different instruments accompanying key moments in some of the songs, such as the saxophone and erhu. In December 2013, it was announced that Eustis would not be performing with the band on the following 2014 tour.

In 2014, Eustis announced that he would release a full-length solo debut as Sons of Magdalene, a moniker adopted in 2007, when his father was diagnosed with cancer. The album, titled Move to Pain, was partially recorded before Cooper's death and was released on June 24, 2014, through Audraglint Recordings.

Starting from the beginning of 2015, Eustis became an active member of The Black Queen, along with Greg Puciato and Steven Alexander.

Eustis supported Tropic of Cancer's European tour from October 27 to November 13, 2015.

On January 4, 2016, it was revealed that Eustis would perform his first official concert as Telefon Tel Aviv on April 2, 2016, at Benjamin Wynn's concert at The Regent in downtown L.A.

== Discography ==
With Black Light Burns

- Cruel Melody (2007)

As Second Woman

- Second Woman (2016)
- E/P (2017)
- S/W (2017)
- Instant/Apart (2018)

As The Black Queen

- The End Where We Start (2015)
- Ice to Never (2015)
- Fever Daydream (2016)
- Infinite Games (2018)

As Sons of Magdalene

- Ephemera EP (2008)
- Move to Pain (2014)
- Ecumenicals (2015)

With Telefon Tel Aviv

- Fahrenheit Fair Enough (2001)
- Map of What Is Effortless (2004)
- Immolate Yourself (2009)
- Dreams Are Not Enough (2019)

With Nine Inch Nails

- Hesitation Marks (2013)
  - Backing vocals on "I Would for You"
- Live 2013 (2013)

With Puscifer

- "V" Is for Vagina (2007)
- "C" is for (Please Insert Sophomoric Genitalia Reference HERE) (2009)
- Conditions of My Parole (2011)
- Donkey Punch the Night (2013)

Other contributions

- The Used – In Love and Death (2004)
- L'Altra – Different Days (2005)
- L'Altra – Telepathic (2010)

Remixes

- Nine Inch Nails – "The Frail (Version)" (2000) (as Benelli)
- A Perfect Circle – "3 Libras (Feel My Ice Dub)" (2000)
- A Perfect Circle – "Judith (Remix)" (2000)
- A Perfect Circle – "Weak and Powerless (Remix)" (2003)
- A Perfect Circle – "Weak and Powerless (Tilling My Grave Mix)" (2003)
- A Perfect Circle – "Judith (Renholdër Mix)"
- Marilyn Manson – "Irresponsible Hate Anthem (Venus Head Trap Mix)" (2005)
- Puscifer – "Rev 22:20 (Rev 4:20 Mix)" (2005)
- Puscifer – "Indigo Children (JLE Dub Mix)" (2008)
- Puscifer – "Monsoons (JLE Motorik Mix)" (2013)

Marty Supreme (2025)

- Contributed production, string and voice orchestration, tenor saxophone, fretless bass to the soundtrack of the 2025 film Marty Supreme
