= Telefon Tel Aviv =

American electronic music project

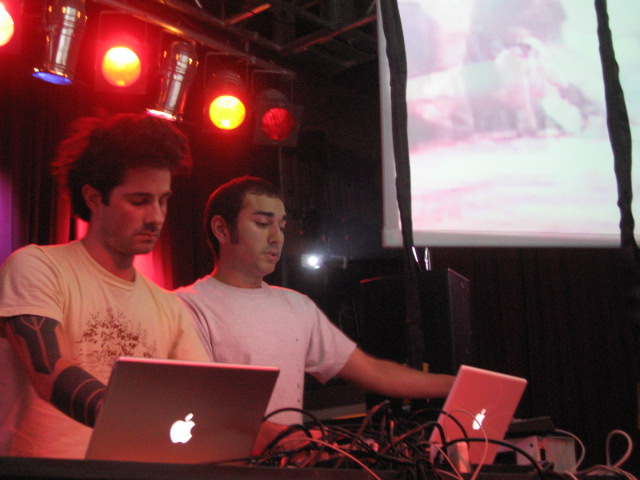
- Telefon Tel Aviv performing in 2006

Background information
- Origin: New Orleans, Louisiana, U.S.
- Genres: IDM; ambient techno; glitch
- Years active: 1999–present
- Labels: Hefty; BPitch Control; Ghostly International
- Members: Joshua Eustis
- Past members: Charles Cooper

Telefon Tel Aviv is an American electronic music act formed in 1999 by the musicians Charles Cooper and Joshua Eustis. Since Cooper's death in 2009, Telefon Tel Aviv has continued with Eustis as the sole official member. They have released four studio albums, one EP, one remix album, and several singles.

== History ==
Telefon Tel Aviv was formed in 1999 by Charles Cooper and Joshua Eustis, with their debut album, Fahrenheit Fair Enough, being released in 2001. The duo followed it with the EP Immediate Action in 2002. In 2004, they published their second full-length album, Map of What Is Effortless, and the compilation album Remixes Compiled came out in 2007.

Telefon Tel Aviv released their third studio album, Immolate Yourself, in 2009. Influenced by the English electronic band OMD, it peaked at no. 17 on the Billboard Top Electronic Albums chart. In 2016, their debut was re-issued, with eight bonus tracks.

The band has contributed samples to the Native Instruments Synthetic Drums 2 sample library.

=== Death of Charles Cooper ===
On January 22, 2009, Eustis announced on the group's MySpace blog that Charles Cooper had died. He subsequently posted that all upcoming tour plans had been cancelled and that the band's future was uncertain.

In July, Eustis clarified that three autopsy reports ruled Cooper's death to not have been suicide but possibly an accidental mix of sleeping pills and alcohol.

=== Sons of Magdalene and future ===
In December 2013, Eustis posted on the Telefon Tel Aviv website that he was going back into the studio full-time and that he had been sitting on a 95% finished full-length album under the moniker of Sons of Magdalene. He also confirmed that he would continue working under the Telefon Tel Aviv moniker. In 2019, Telefon Tel Aviv released the album Dreams Are Not Enough.

== Discography ==
=== Studio albums ===
- Fahrenheit Fair Enough (2001)
- Map of What Is Effortless (2004)
- Immolate Yourself (2009)
- Dreams Are Not Enough (2019)

=== EPs ===
- Immediate Action (2002)

=== Compilations ===
- Remixes Compiled (2007)

=== Selected remixes and collaborations ===
- Nine Inch Nails – "Where Is Everybody?" (Things Falling Apart) (2000)
- Oliver Nelson – "Stolen Moments" (Impulsive! Revolutionary Jazz Reworked) (2005)
- Genghis Tron – "Relief" (Board Up the House Remixes Volume 4) (2008)
- Cubenx – "Grass" (Grass Remixes) (2012)
- Lusine – "Arterial" (Arterial Reworks) (2015)
- Modeselektor – "Mean Friend" (Telefon Tel Aviv Remix) (2021)
