= Hefty Records =

American independent record label

Hefty Records is an independent record label based in Chicago, Illinois (United States). Founded in 1995 by John Hughes III, who is the son of the director John Hughes, the label releases records in a range of genres that include post-rock, IDM, down-tempo, nu jazz, experimental music, and hip-hop.

== History ==
Hefty Records was formed by John Hughes with Dan Snazelle as a way of releasing Hughes' own music. Hughes, the son of filmmaker John Hughes, had been interested in music since his youth, but had initially been more interested in record production than in creating music of his own. The label was formed in 1995 while Hughes was a college student, and was originally set up in his dorm room. Hughes chose the label name because, as he put it, "I liked it because it sounded optimistic. And it had a conquering tone to it."

The first label's releases were of Hughes's own work as Slicker just after the breakup of his previous band Bill Ding. Hefty began the Immediate Action series in 2000, a collection intended to consist of six vinyl records. The sleeves were created by the Brooklyn graphics company Graphic Havoc. In 2005, the label hosted a live concert in Chicago and released two volumes of compilation and remix material from artists on the label, titled History is Bunk: Collaborations, Reinterpretations and New Compositions. Their last release was in 2010.

== Artists ==
- Victor Bermon
- Phil Cohran
- Euphone
- Ghosts and Vodka
- L'Altra
- Eliot Lipp
- Plus Device
- Prefuse 73
- Radicalfashion
- Phil Ranelin
- Retina.IT
- Savath and Savalas
- Slicker
- Smaze
- Samadha
- Solo Andata
- Some Water and Sun
- Spanova
- Telefon Tel Aviv
- T. Raumschmiere
- Twine (band)

== Compilation albums ==
- Immediate Action series of 9 EP's
- Hefty's 10th Anniversary series of 4 albums
