= Com Truise discography =

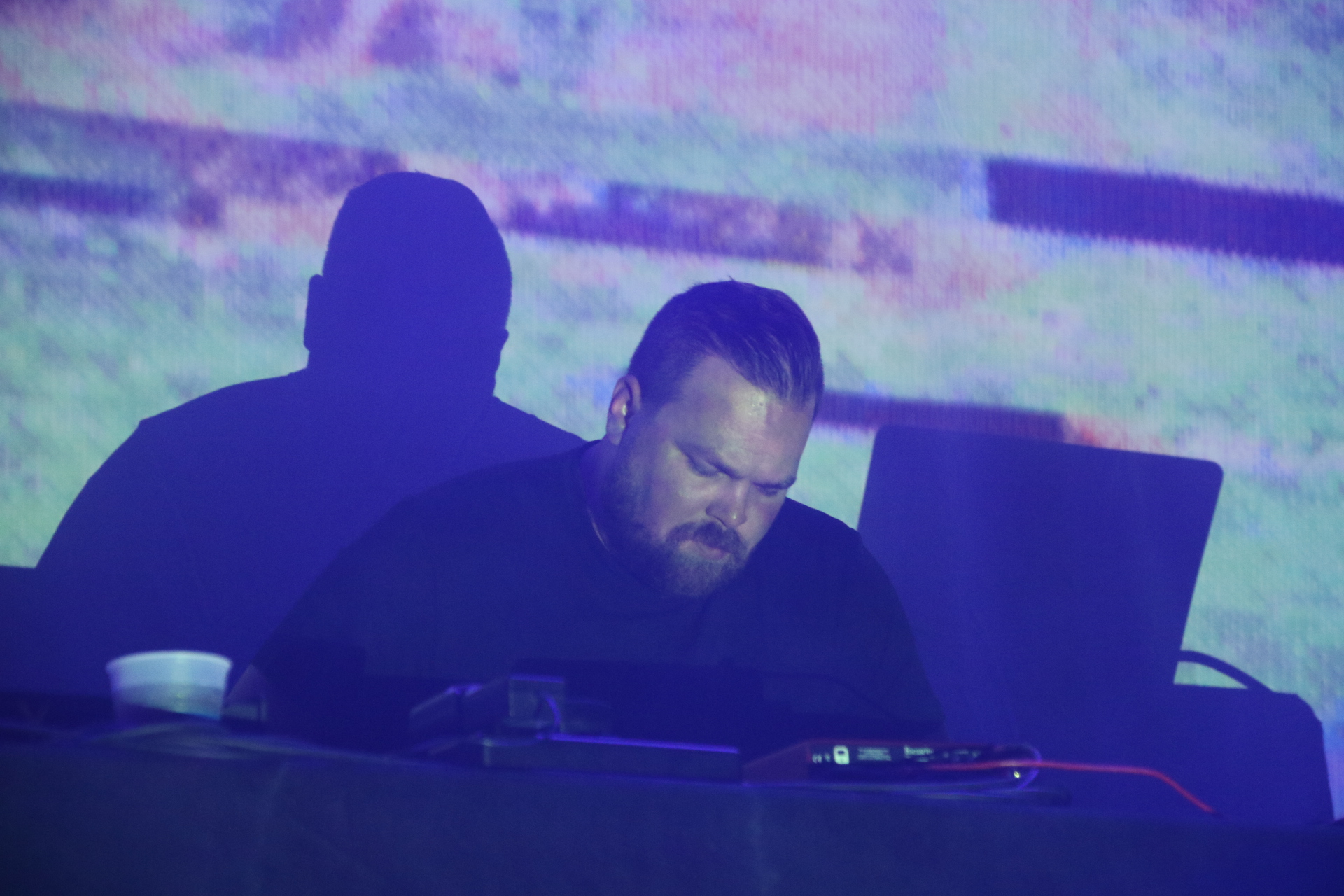
- Com Truise performing at the Gothic Theatre in 2019
- Studio albums: 3
- EPs: 4
- Compilation albums: 2
- Singles: 22
- Music videos: 8
- Production credits: 3
- Writing credits: 1
- Remixes: 49

The discography of American synthwave musician Com Truise consists of three studio albums, two compilation albums, eight music videos, four extended plays (EP), 22 singles, three production credits, one writing credit, and 49 remixes.

== Albums ==
=== Studio albums ===
Title	Album details	Peak chart positions		
Title	Album details	US Heat	US Dance	UK Dance
Galactic Melt	Released: June 5, 2011; Label: Ghostly International	—	—	—
Iteration	Released: June 16, 2017; Label: Ghostly International	4	7	26
Persuasion System (Note: Officially promoted as a mini album.)	Released: May 17, 2019; Label: Ghostly International	3	10	—
"—" denotes a recording that did not chart or was not released in that territory.

=== Compilation albums ===
Title	Album details	Peak chart positions	
Title	Album details	US Heat	US Dance
In Decay	Released: July 16, 2012; Label: Ghostly International	—	—
In Decay, Too	Released: December 4, 2020; Label: Ghostly International	13	8
"—" denotes a recording that did not chart or was not released in that territory.

== Extended plays ==
Title	EP details	Peak chart positions		
Title	EP details	US Heat	US Dance	UK Physical
Cyanide Sisters	Released: January 25, 2011; Label: Ghostly International	—	—	—
Fairlight	Released: May 3, 2011; Label: Ghostly International	—	—	—
Wave 1	Released: February 18, 2014; Label: Ghostly International	6	7	—
Silicon Tare	Released: April 1, 2016; Label: Ghostly International	—	4	61
Brokendate	Released: March 31, 2023; Label: Ghostly International	—	—	—
"—" denotes a recording that did not chart or was not released in that territory.

== Singles ==
Title	Year	Album
"Komputer"	2010	Non-album single
"5891"	2010	Cyanide Sisters
"Cathode Girls"	2011	Galactic Melt
"Datebar"	2011	Non-album single
"She Melts"	2011	Non-album single (Note: Later appeared on In Decay, Too (2020).)
"Open"	2012	In Decay
"Idle Withdrawal"	2013	Non-album single
"Declination" (featuring Joel Ford)	2013	Wave 1
"Subsonic"	2014	Wave 1
"Forgive"	2015	Non-album single (Note: Later appeared on Silicon Tare (2016).)
"Diffraction"	2016	Silicon Tare
"Silicon Tare"	2016	Silicon Tare
"Memory"	2017	Iteration
"Isostasy"	2017	Iteration
"Propagation"	2017	Iteration
"Existence Schematic"	2019	Persuasion System
"Persuasion System"	2019	Persuasion System
"Ultrafiche of You"	2019	Persuasion System
"False Ascendancy"	2020	In Decay, Too
"Compress—Fuse"	2020	In Decay, Too
"Humint"	2021	Non-album single
"Arwarw"	2021	Galactic Melt (10th Anniversary Edition)

== Other charted songs ==
Title	Year	Peak chart positions	Album
Title	Year	US Dance	Album
"4 Morant (Better Luck Next Time)"	2023	34	Brokendate

== Songwriting and production credits ==
Title	Year	Artist	Album	Credits
"Business Pleasure"	2014	Little Boots	Business Pleasure	Producer
"Watermelon"	2015	Oddience	Non-album single	Producer
"Not Human"	2018	ionnalee	Everyone Afraid to Be Forgotten	Co-songwriter

== Music videos ==
Title	Year	Album	Director
"Iwywaw"	2010	Cyanide Sisters	AAVV
"Fairlight"	2011	Fairlight	William Joines
"Brokendate"	2011	Galactic Melt	William Joines
"Terminal"	2012	Galactic Melt	Myk
"Subsonic"	2014	Wave 1	Hans Lo
"Idle Withdrawal"	2016	Non-album single	Matthew Lawless
"Propagation"	2017	Iteration	William Joines & Karrie Crouse
"Ultrafiche of You"	2019	Persuasion System	Gianluca Minucci

== Remixes ==
- FOE – "A Handsome Stranger Called Death (Com Truise RMX)" (August 2010)
- Neon Indian – "Sleep Paralysist (Com Truise 'Disorder' Remix)" (November 2010)
- Neon Indian – "Sleep Paralysist (Com Truise 'Eyelid' Remix)" (November 2010)
- Twin Shadow – "Castles In The Snow (Com Truise Remix)" (November 2010)
- Franklin – "I Know (Com Truise Remix)" (January 2011)
- Daft Punk – "Encom Part 2 (Com Truise Remix)" (April 2011)
- Hussle Club – "Loose Tights (Com Truise Tight Pants Remix)" (April 2011)
- Ana Lola Roman – "Klutch (Com Truise Remix)" (April 2011)
- Locussolus – "Throwdown (Com Truise Remix)" (June 2011)
- Foster the People – "Helena Beat (Com Truise Remix)" (December 2011)
- Arsenal – "One Day At A Time (Com Truise Remix)" (February 2012)
- ZZ Ward – "Criminal ft Freddie Gibbs (Com Truise Remix)" (July 2012)
- Saint Michel – "Katherine (Com Truise Remix)" (September 2012)
- Sky Ferreira – "Red Lips (Com Truise Remix)" (September 2012)
- Maroon 5 – "One More Night (Com Truise Remix)" (October 2012)
- Sally Shapiro – "What Can I Do (Com Truise Remix)" (November 2012)
- El Ten Eleven – "Thanks Bill (Com Truise Remix)" (April 2013)
- Stars – "Hold On When You Get Love And Let Go When You Give It (Com Truise Remix)" (April 2013)
- Everything Everything – "Kemosabe (Com Truise Remix)" (May 2013)
- Charli XCX – "What I Like (Com Truise Remix)" (May 2013)
- Darkness Falls – "Timeline (Com Truise Remix)" (July 2013)
- Blood Diamonds feat. Dominic Lord – "Barcode (Com Truise Remix)" (September 2013)
- The Twilight Sad – "Sick (Com Truise Remix)" (October 2013)
- Kris Menace feat. Lawrence LT Thompson – "Love Is Everywhere (Com Truise Remix)" (October 2013)
- beGun – "Shanghai (Com Truise Remix)" (October 2013)
- Bloodgroup – "Mysteries Undone (Com Truise Remix)" (December 2013)
- Flight Facilities – "Stand Still feat. Micky Green (Com Truise Remix)" (December 2013)
- The Knocks – "Learn To Fly (Com Truise Remix)" (December 2013)
- Hollow & Akimbo – "Singularity (Com Truise Remix)" (January 2014)
- Client Liaison – "Free Of Fear (Com Truise Remix)" (January 2014)
- Junior Prom – "Sheila Put The Knife Down (Com Truise Remix)" (February 2014)
- Weeknight – "Dark Light (Com Truise Remix)" (February 2014)
- Tapioca and the Flea – "Take It Slow (Com Truise Remix)" (June 2014)
- Tycho – "Awake (Com Truise Remix)" (25 June 2014)
- Bear Hands – "Agora (Com Truise Remix)" (October 2014)
- Kodak to Graph – "Iamanthem (Com Truise Remix)" (26 May 2015)
- Phantoms – "Broken Halo (feat. Nicholas Braun) [Com Truise Remix]" (25 September 2015)
- Digitalism – "Battlecry (Com Truise Remix)" (27 May 2016)
- Midnight to Monaco – "One in a Million (Com Truise Remix)" (10 June 2016)
- Deftones – "Prayers/Triangles (Com Truise Remix)" (24 June 2016)
- Deadmau5 – "Strobe (Com Truise Remix)" (23 September 2016)
- Moodoïd – "Planète Tokyo (Com Truise Remix)" (4 April 2018)
- ginla – "Infinite (Com Truise Remix)" (19 March 2019)
- Hermitude - "Every Day (feat. Hoodlem) [Com Truise Remix]" (11 May 2019)
- All Hail the Silence – "City Lovers (Com Truise Remix)" (7 June 2019)
- Gold Fields - "Waterfall (Com Truise Remix)" (8 July 2019)
- Dua Saleh - "Warm Pants (Com Truise Remix)" (25 July 2019)
- Tycho – "No Stress (Com Truise Remix)" (15 December 2020)
- Small Black - "Duplex (Com Truise Remix)" (25 June 2021)

== Commercial ==
Haley created the music for a 60-second Coinbase ad which aired during the 2022 Super Bowl.
