= Idol Tryouts 2 =

Compilation album by Ghostly International
- Released: 2006
- Recorded: 2004–2006
- Genre: Electronic / dance
- Label: Ghostly International

Ghostly International chronology
Idol Tryouts (2003)	Idol Tryouts 2 (2006)

Professional ratings
Review scores
Source	Rating
Allmusic	link

Idol Tryouts 2 is a various artists compilation album released by Ann Arbor, Michigan-based record label Ghostly International. It is the label's third compilation overall and the second in their Idol Tryouts series. Idol Tryouts 2 contains tracks from artists on the label and spans the musical genres of electronica, techno, electro, tech house and trip hop. Included in Idol Tryouts 2 is a second disc which highlights ambient music selections from Ghostly International artists.

== Idol Tryouts 2 track listing ==
=== Disc one ===
1. Solvent "Introduction to Ghosts"
2. Matthew Dear "Send You Back"
3. Outputmessage "Sommeil"
4. Skeletons & The Girl-Faced Boys "Fit Black Man"
5. Kill Memory Crash "Press + Burn"
6. Dabrye "Magic Says"
7. Mobius Band "Electronic Piano"
8. Daniel Wang "Berlin Sunrise"
9. Charles Mainer "Bang Bang Lover"
10. Benoit Pioulard "Depths & the Seashore"
11. Solvent "Spin Cycle"
12. Lawrence "Wasting a Fall"
13. Mobius Band "Loving Sounds of Static" (Junior Boys Remix)

=== Disc two ===
1. Loscil "Umbra"
2. Deru "Straight Speak"
3. Sybarite "Sanctuary"
4. Cepia "Ramp"
5. Cepia "Hoarse"
6. Kiln "Isthmus"
7. Greg Davis "Amaranthine"
8. Lusine + David Wingo "Locks"
9. Aeroc "Little Something"
10. Christoper Willits "Colors Shifting"
11. Terre's Neu Wuss Fusion "Love on a Real Train (Risky Business)"
12. Twine "Gliding in On"
13. Tim Hecker "Sundown6093"
14. Richard Devine "Murman"
