= Iteration (album) =

Studio album by Com Truise
- Released: June 16, 2017
- Genre: Electronic
- Length: 49:58
- Label: Ghostly
- Producer: Com Truise

Com Truise chronology
Silicon Tare (2016)	Iteration (2017)	Persuasion System (2019)

Singles from Iteration
- 1. "Memory" Released: April 4, 2017; 2. "Isostasy" Released: May 8, 2017; 3. "Propagation" Released: June 5, 2017

Iteration is the second studio album by American electronic musician Seth Haley as Com Truise, released on June 16, 2017, by Ghostly International. It is the last in his series of albums about the story of a fictional astronaut named Com Truise. This part of the story involves Truise escaping with his alien lover from the planet Wave 1 in order to live in space together. Iteration is the project's first studio album since In Decay (2012). Haley went to record in Burbank, California, an area with a very "open space", in order to get excited into the material he was making. The space is reflected in the sound and production of the music, which is less compressed and more simple than Haley's previous Com Truise albums.

Promoted with three singles and a music video for "Propagation" starring Trieste Kelly Dunn, Iteration landed in the top ten of Billboard's American Dance/Electronic Albums and Top Heatseekers charts. Reviews of the album from critics were also generally favorable; some reviewers called it Haley's best record to date, and some highlighted the improvement of Haley's compositional techniques.

== Concept ==
Iteration is the last of a series of records by Seth Haley, Galactic Melt (2011), Wave 1 (2014), and Silicon Tare (2016), that tell the story of a space traveller named Com Truise. Haley first discussed the last chapter of the story in an April 2016 interview with Magnetic magazine: "It'll have some closure within it, but I think it'll be dark and light at the same time. As much as I'm striving to put an end to this story, I think it'll be still open-ended, kind of a to-be-continued sort of thing." Described by Haley as a tale about escaping an oppressed society, Iteration involves Truise and his alien lover who try to escape from the planet Wave 1 to enjoy each other's company in space. Haley titled the LP "Iteration" as a "weird smirky smile" to the repetitive nature of most electronic music. Haley's cover artwork for Iteration features red lines representing the "iteration" aspect of the record and symbols representing the obstacles Com Truise goes through to escape from Wave 1.

== Production and composition ==
Iteration consists of sounds commonly heard in most Com Truise releases, such as what the press release described as "neon-streaked melodies, big drums, robotic grooves, [and] bleary nostalgia." However, it is less compressed and more simple than Haley's previous releases for the project, a reflection of the increased "space" Haley went into for making the LP. Some of the album's moods derived from Haley suffering from homesickness and burnout while he was living in Los Angeles and doing world touring. It wasn't until Haley had lived in the city for a year and a half that he changed the way he produced his material, focusing on being in an area with more "open space", that being Burbank, and using outboard equipment instead of computer software. These changes got him excited into the material he was making, thus leading Truise to create Iteration in a short amount of time. As the album's official press release claimed how this excitement influenced the tone of the record, "By embracing the music's inherent nature and peerless qualities, Iteration finds new avenues of expression in its vivid, familiar surroundings."

== Tracks ==
Iteration begins with "...Of Your Fake Dimension", a prelude of the album's story consisting of a Cocteau Twins-style guitar and sounds from the Elektron Analog Keys synthesizer. As Haley described "Ephmeron", "We're thrown right into the action following the last song on Silicon Tare ('du Zirconia') which saw our hero Com Truise in quite a frenzied state. At the end of the song, it feels as if all is disintegrating." The third song on the album is named "Dryswch", Welsh for "confusion", and one of the two songs on the LP along with "Ternary" showcasing Haley's experimentation with wavetable synthesis, which he was hugely into. Haley described it as a "choir of synthesizer voices singing Com Truise back to life." "Isostasy" had been performed live by Haley for a few years before Iteration was released and was one of the first tracks made for the LP. The chords on the track are performed by the Oberheim Xpander. "Memory" is the LP's most upbeat cut, a "robot funk" track about accepting that "everything turns into a memory including us", explained Haley. Its instrumentation includes staccato notes performed by Dave Smith Instruments' Prophet-6 synth and Roland Juno-106, as well as sounds from the Eurorack playing near the end of the song.

"Propagation", a slow-tempo ballad about being free from an otherwise oppressed society, consists of an ARP Odyssey bass, chords performed by a Dave Smith OB6, and sounds from a Yamaha DX7. The track is followed by "Vacuume", which, according to Haley deals with "being sucked into the void without regrets or remorse" and "letting go, being in the moment and working through whatever comes your way." "Ternary" a song regarding "the things that make you who you end up becoming", said Haley, and also includes more Juno-106 staccatos and the use of Eurorack for effects. The Eurorack is also used to perform synthesized brass alongside "gliding" Prophet-6 sounds and textures from the Teenage Engineering OP-1 on "Usurper", a song about the weaknesses of leaders of a society and the ability of citizens to end oppression. "Syrthio", its title meaning "to fall", is followed by what serves as the album's "credits roll" cut "When Will You Find the Limit…" Iteration ends with the Oberheim Xpander-heavy title track.

== Release and promotion ==
Three singles were released from Iteration: "Memory" on April 5, 2017, "Isostasy" on May 9, 2017, and "Propagation" on June 6, 2017. "Propagation" received a music video premiered by The A.V. Club on September 20, 2017. Written and directed by Will Joines and Karrie Crouse, the video stars Trieste Kelly Dunn as an "idealized wife-bot" who "slowly becomes self-aware" and murders its owner.

== Reception ==
Professional ratings
Aggregate scores
Source	Rating
AnyDecentMusic?	6.7/10
Metacritic	72/100
Review scores
Source	Rating
AllMusic	4/5 stars
The A.V. Club	B
Exclaim!	8/10
Loud and Quiet	5/10
Mojo	3/5 stars
Pitchfork	6.7/10
PopMatters	7/10 stars
The Skinny	4/5 stars
Spectrum Culture	3/5 stars
Under the Radar	5/10 stars

According to review aggregator Metacritic, Iteration received "generally favorable reviews". An Exclaim! review stated that with the album, Haley "has demonstrated growth that only a musician with a decade of experience can accomplish." The album garnered significant claims from publications, such as being the "definitive release" of the Com Truise project by AllMusic, "the pinnacle of Haley's career" by Gigsoup's Shaun Soman, and "the kind of album necessary to help us battle through the rest of 2017" by The Skinny critic Megan Wallace. Soman and Wallace particularly complimented the "variety" in the musical structure and production of the LP, Soman noting it to be especially noticeable through headphone listening. As Wallace stated, "[Haley] displays a complete mastery of his craft, buil[d]ing up electronic sounds in an alternate language ample enough to express shifting moods and paint a series of tableaux." AllMusic later put the LP on its list of "Favorite Electronic Albums" of 2017, while Piccadilly Records, ranking the album number 36 on their list of the best albums of 2017, called it "a stunning collection, supremely memorable, and warmly dynamic."

Chris Ingalls of PopMatters described the album as "an honest, oddly humanistic new release from an artist with a glorious keyboard arsenal who knows how to use it." He highlighted the record's "moderation" in terms of its use of elements of 1980s synthesizer music, writing that "Haley injects plenty of hooks and sonic layers on Iteration, but it never seems overstuffed." Pitchfork's Saby Kulkarni praised Haley's "higher level of sophistication", writing that while the music of Com Truise usually has a "limited range", Iteration was more focused on its compositions rather than its sounds unlike previous records of the projects: "Haley goes for the gold with hooks so big and melodic they cause a kind of auditory sugar rush. The fact that he's able to do so without a single vocal in sight shows what a skilled craftsperson he’s become."

The melodic aspect of Iteration was also praised in an otherwise mixed review from Under the Radar's Stephen Mayne, who summarized the LP "veers between the futuristic past and a more modern sound that comes with a nice melodic ring and little in the way of impact." A review published in Loud and Quiet stated that while the album was well-made, it lacked in "excitement" and was nothing more than "background music." Mixmag's Andrew Rafter was positive towards Iteration but felt that it should've had more songs with dark moods like "Syrthio" and the LP's title track. The Line of Best Fit opined the LP is best to listen to as a "celebration" of 1980s pop music rather than "an emotionally engaging album" as it was marketed by Ghostly, reasoning that "finding the true feeling among towers of 80s pop synths and sequencers feels difficult at times." A review for The 405 also criticized the marketing of the album as a record with a story, stating it was felt only "on occasion."

== Track listing ==
Iteration track listing
No.	Title	Length
1.	"...Of Your Fake Dimension"	3:28
2.	"Ephemeron"	4:17
3.	"Dryswch"	4:46
4.	"Isostasy"	4:26
5.	"Memory"	3:35
6.	"Propagation"	4:11
7.	"Vacuume"	3:19
8.	"Ternary"	4:12
9.	"Usurper"	3:43
10.	"Syrthio"	4:45
11.	"When Will You Find the Limit..."	5:39
12.	"Iteration"	3:38
Total length:		49:58

== Personnel ==
- Songwriting, production, and artwork by Seth Haley
- Mastered by Paul Gold at Salt Mastering in Brooklyn, New York.

== Charts ==
Chart performance for Iteration
Chart (2017)	Peak position
US Top Dance Albums (Billboard)	7
US Heatseekers Albums (Billboard)	4

== Release history ==
Release history for Iteration
Region	Date	Format(s)	Label
Various	June 16, 2017	Cassette; CD; digital download; vinyl	Ghostly International
