= Persuasion System =

Studio album by Com Truise
- Released: May 17, 2019
- Genre: Synthwave
- Length: 33:09
- Label: Ghostly International
- Producer: Seth Haley

Com Truise chronology
Iteration (2017)	Persuasion System (2019)	In Decay, Too (2020)

Singles from Persuasion System
- 1. "Existence Schematic" Released: March 5, 2019; 2. "Persuasion System" Released: April 10, 2019; 3. "Ultrafiche of You" Released: May 15, 2019

Persuasion System is a mini-LP by American musician Seth Haley under his stage name Com Truise. It was released on May 17, 2019, by Ghostly International. It received generally favorable reviews from critics.

== Background and release ==
Seth Haley's previous works Galactic Melt (2011), Wave 1 (2014), Silicon Tare (2016), and Iteration (2017), tells the story of a space traveler named Com Truise. Iteration was the last album about the story. According to Haley's label Ghostly International, with Persuasion System, "Haley leaves the past narrative behind". According to Ghostly, the album "began as an experiment. Haley switched digital audio workstations, rebuilt his palette of sounds, and tasked himself with simply trying it out".

On March 5, 2019, he announced the album while also releasing its first single, "Existence Schematic". A second single, the title-track, was released on April 10. On May 15, "Ultrafiche of You", the third and final single, was released. A music video for it was released on June 19, which, as described by Ghostly, is a "metaphysical journey through the seasons of life."

== Reception ==
Professional ratings
Aggregate scores
Source	Rating
AnyDecentMusic?	6.4/10
Metacritic	71/100
Review scores
Source	Rating
AllMusic	3.5/5 stars
Exclaim!	6/10
musicOMH	3.3/5 stars
Sputnikmusic	3/5
Under the Radar	7.5/10

On review aggregator Metacritic, Persuasion System has a rating of 71/100, indicating "generally favorable reviews", while, on review aggregator AnyDecentMusic?, the album has a rating of 6.4/10. Critics found the album similar to Haley's previous work; Paul Simpson wrote to AllMusic that "Persuasion System signals a bit of a different approach for Haley, but not so much that it will alienate anyone who enjoyed his earlier releases," while Simon K. wrote to Sputnikmusic that "It's not a bad album by any means and if you like his work, this will deliver in all the ways you’d expect, but in that regard that’s half the problem."

== Track listing ==
Persuasion System track listing
No.	Title	Length
1.	"Worldline"	1:53
2.	"Persuasion System"	3:49
3.	"Gaussian"	2:01
4.	"Ultrafiche of You"	4:59
5.	"Kontex"	3:42
6.	"Existence Schematic"	4:03
7.	"Laconism"	4:06
8.	"Privilege Escalation"	5:57
9.	"Departure"	2:39
Total length:		33:09

== Charts ==
Chart performance for Persuasion System
Chart (2019)	Peak position
US Top Album Sales (Billboard)	47
US Top Current Album Sales (Billboard)	41
US Top Dance/Electronic Albums (Billboard)	10
US Heatseekers Albums (Billboard)	3
US Independent Albums (Billboard)	14
US Vinyl Albums (Billboard)	8
