= I-F =

Dutch producer and DJ

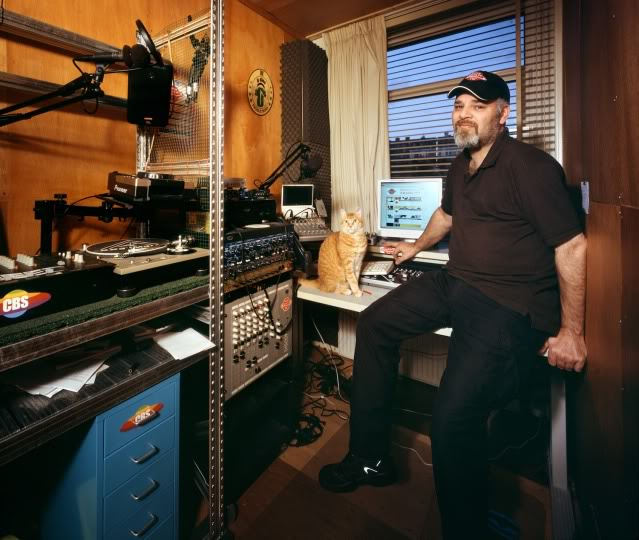
- Ferenc van der Sluijs (2011)

Background information
- Also known as: Interr-Ference
- Origin: The Hague, Netherlands
- Genres: Electronic, electro, electroclash, pop, Italo disco, chiptune
- Years active: 1996-present
- Labels: Disko B EFA; Viewlexx

I-f (also Interr-Ference) is the stage name of Ferenc E. van der Sluijs, a Dutch producer and DJ based in The Hague.

== Overview ==
"Space Invaders Are Smoking Grass" (1997)
I-F's "Space Invaders Are Smoking Grass" (1997), described as "burbling electro in a vocodered homage to Atari-era hi-jinks," is "widely credited with catalysing" the electroclash movement.

In 1997 he produced the track "Space Invaders Are Smoking Grass", which became a huge underground dance hit and is often cited as an early example of electroclash. It introduced "old-fashioned verse-chorus dynamics to burbling electro in a vocodered homage to Atari-era hi-jinks" and is the "record widely credited with catalysing" the electroclash movement.

The album Fucking Consumer was released in 1998 on the Disko B label, followed by The Man From Pack the next year. In 1999 he also made the mixed album Mixed Up In the Hague Vol. 1, which has been cited by many, including Morgan Geist, as being the catalyst that brought renewed interest in Italo disco.

I-f was featured on the seminal 2002 Ghostly International compilation Disco Nouveau. He has also recorded as The Parallax Corporation with Intergalactic Gary. I-f currently runs a record label called Viewlexx. He also ran the internet radio station Cybernetic Broadcasting System (CBS). It was closed down in 2008 but is now one of four channels on Intergalactic FM, which is also operated by I-f.

== Discography ==
- 1995 – Portrait Of A Dead Girl 1: The Cause
- 1997 – The Brown Elbow Conspiracy
- 1997 – "Space Invaders Are Smoking Grass"
- 1997 – Playstation #2
- 1998 – Fucking Consumer
- 1999 – The Man From Pack

== See also ==
- Intergalactic FM
