= Shinbangumi =

Studio album by Ginger Root
- Released: September 13, 2024
- Genres: Hypnagogic pop; city pop; synth funk; indie pop
- Length: 32:02
- Label: Ghostly International

Ginger Root chronology
Nisemono (2022)	Shinbangumi (2024)

Singles from Shinbangumi
- 1. "No Problems" Released: 22 May 2024; 2. "Better Than Monday" Released: 18 June 2024; 3. "All Night / There Was A Time" Released: 17 July 2024; 4. "Only You" Released: 15 August 2024

Shinbangumi ([ɕimbaŋɡɯmi], lit. 'new program' or 'a new season of a show', stylized as SHINBANGUMI) is the fourth studio album by Ginger Root, and the first Ginger Root album released under Ghostly International. The album is a concept album set in the same fictitious reality as his previous EP, Nisemono, with Ginger Root being fired from "Juban TV" and starting his own TV station called "Ginger Root Productions".

== Background ==
On 15 May 2024, Ginger Root released the first official tease of the upcoming album, via a fake anime movie trailer called "Meet You In the Galaxy: The Movie", featuring the voice actors Tomohisa Asô, Shino Kakinuma, and Kimiko Takeguchi. Three days later, Ginger Root released a second teaser showing Cameron Lew pitching the idea of the movie to his fictional manager, plainly called "The Manager" (played by Nanami Iwasaki). The Manager then presents a "better" idea for Cameron to do, "Loretta 2" (as a sequel to "Loretta", a song he made that became a hit). Cameron rejects the idea and is promptly fired, teasing the first single at the very end.

On 22 May 2024, Ginger Root released the first single of the album, "No Problems", with an accompanying music video, continuing the story from the second teaser. Ginger Root also announced the name of the upcoming album (Shinbangumi) and its scheduled release date, a concept album following the narrative of his previous 2022 EP, Nisemono. When asked what the upcoming album would sound like, Cameron described it as "aggressive elevator soul", mixing together Japanese city pop, French pop, Philly soul, and his typical lo-fi sound. Other influences Cameron cited as sources for the album was Paul and Linda McCartney's 1971 album Ram, Devo, Vulfpeck, and Miki Matsubara's 1980 song "Mayonaka no Door (Stay with Me).

Cameron Lew said Shinbangumi was a snapshot of his life at the time lyrically, with some of the songs were written during Lew's time in Japan. According to Cameron, the album was the first time he felt comfortable about knowing what a song should consist of musically and instrumentation wise. Cameron also intended for the music videos to be like a movie, with a linear story, to be "comparable to a traditional movie". The movie takes place in a fictitious reality known as "The Juban District". According to Cameron (off-screen) in the exposition of said movie, the Juban District is a 50/50 mix of 1980s Japan and 1980s America. The name is taken from Azabu-Jūban, an upscale neighborhood in Tokyo and the setting of Sailor Moon.

== Release ==
On 13 September 2024, Shinbangumi was released on music streaming services and his Bandcamp, with physical releases on black and coloured vinyl, cassette, and CD. Accompanying the album was the music videos for each of the singles and a final film containing the album's remaining songs. Ginger Root toured the album travelling across North America, Europe, Asia, and Australia.

=== Music videos ===
Along with the singles came a music video each along with a full album visualizer and short film with the album's release. For each of the music videos, they were produced with a 4:3 aspect ratio to give the viewer the feeling of watching a CRT television (noted by Claire Brown as being blanketed in "VHS fuzz"), enhancing the city pop and Shōwa era Japan, including Cup Noodles, a bullet train, a Toyota Camry, and a Panasonic boombox.

=== TV movie ===
On 20 April 2025, Ginger Root released a YouTube video announcing a partnership with Toonami to broadcast the movie "Shinbangumi" on 26 April. The movie is an hour long compilation of all the previously released music videos and teasers stitched together for a continuous watch. On 29 April 2025, Ginger Root announced the movie would be released for home media on VHS.

== Reception ==
Professional ratings
Review scores
Source	Rating
AllMusic	3.5/5 stars
EARMILK	4.5/5 stars
Spectrum Culture	3.5/5 stars
The Needle Drop	7/10
Under the Radar	7.5/10

Shinbangumi was largely praised by critics. Marcy Donaldson of AllMusic praised the album for its ambition and wide range of styles it fused in its production. Leo Edworthy of EARMILK described the album as "a lovely piece of mutant synth-pop/funk goodness", praising it for is basslines and its bright fun nature which would occasionally reveal a darker side. Thomas Stremfel of Spectrum Culture praised the album for its vibrancy, building on Ginger Root's previous EPs, as well as creating "a brand of pop lost to time" without locking himself into one genre or relying on nostalgia. He did critique the album, however, for setting a high-standard for the album with "No Problems" and "meeting it too frequently", which caused the songs to feel less distinguishable throughout further listens. In spite of the high standards, he also thought Lew could also have done better. Mariel Fechik of Under the Radar praised the album as using a "vertible candy jar of bright influences" while avoiding a "too sugary pastiche" and making the album his own by way of his humor, songwriting, and production.

== Tour ==
Ginger Root began a tour a couple weeks after the album's release. Across its year of touring, the band has visited countries across North America, Europe, the United Kingdom, East Asia, and Australia. The tour also included performances at the music festivals Bonnaroo and Coachella. The setlist consists mostly of Shinbangumi's tracks, but also features songs from his releases post-Toaster_Music (Mahjong Room, Rikki, City Slicker, and Nisemono).

== Track listing ==
All tracks are written by Cameron Lew.

No.	Title	Length
1.	"Welcome"	0:40
2.	"No Problems"	3:44
3.	"Better Than Monday"	2:50
4.	"There Was A Time"	2:49
5.	"All Night"	2:57
6.	"CM"	0:48
7.	"Only You"	3:29
8.	"Kaze"	2:15
9.	"Giddy Up"	3:26
10.	"Think Cool"	0:49
11.	"Show 10"	5:12
12.	"Take Me Back (Owakare No Jikan)"	3:03
Total length:		32:02

== Personnel ==
Adapted from AllMusic

=== Musicians ===
- Cameron Lew – primary artist
- Tomohisa Asô – voice-over
- Shino Kakinuma – voice-over

=== Technical ===
- Cameron Lew – mixing, mastering

== Charts ==
Weekly chart performance for Shinbangumi
Chart (2024)	Peak position
Japan Hot Albums (Billboard Japan)	42
Japan Digital Albums (Billboard Japan)	40
Japan Digital Albums (Oricon)	42
Japan Top Albums Sales (Billboard Japan)	43
Scottish Albums (Official Charts)	67
