= Idol Tryouts =

Compilation album by Ghostly International
- Released: 2003
- Recorded: 2002–2003
- Genre: Electronic / dance
- Label: Ghostly International

Ghostly International chronology
Disco Nouveau (2002)	Idol Tryouts (2003)	Idol Tryouts 2 (2006)

Professional ratings
Review scores
Source	Rating
Allmusic	link

Idol Tryouts is the second various artists compilation album released by Michigan-based label Ghostly International. Unlike the label's previous sampler Disco Nouveau, Idol Tryouts contains music solely from artists signed to Ghostly International. Musical genres represented here span techno, electro, electroclash and tech house.

== Idol Tryouts track listing ==
1. Dabrye "Making It Pay"
2. Charles Mainer "At the Bottle"
3. Midwest Product "Laundry"
4. Midwest Product "A Genuine Display"
5. Kill Memory Crash "Get Out"
6. Matthew Dear "Some New Depression"
7. Kiln "Ero"
8. Dykehouse "Map Ref. 41° N 93° W"
9. Osborne "Daylight (Radio)"
10. James Cotton "Help Me Think of One"
11. Outputmessage "Bernard's Song"
12. Dabrye 73.3 "Prefuse 73 Megamix"
