= Michael Ames =

Mike Ames, Mikey Ames or Michael Ames may refer to:

- Michael E. Ames (1822–1861), American politician from Minnesota Territory
- Michael Ames (actor) (a.k.a. Tod Andrews, 1914–1972), American film and television performer
- Michael M. Ames (1933–2006), Canadian anthropologist
- Michael Ames Viner (1944–2009), American film and record producer
- Stephen Michael Ames (born 1964), Trinidadian golfer
- Mikey Ames, American musical performer and improvisational artist on 2007 album Lucas
- Mike Ames, American ultimate disc player for Cincinnati Revolution 2014 season

== Characters ==
- Michael Ames, played by Barclay Hope in two seasons of 2011 American TV series, The Killing
