= Lucas (album) =

Studio album by Skeletons and the Kings of All Cities
- Released: May 8, 2007
- Recorded: The Silent Barn Recording Facilities, Inc., Ridgewood, New York
- Genre: Indie rock; experimental pop, synth-pop
- Length: 58:53
- Label: Ghostly International, Una Falta de Oxigeno en el Cerebro Music
- Producer: The Hittsburgh Bros. Production Duo

Skeletons and the Kings of All Cities chronology
Git (2005)	Lucas (2007)	MONEY (2009)

Professional ratings
Review scores
Source	Rating
Babyblaue Seiten	12/15
Pitchfork Media	8.2/10
Stylus Magazine	(A−)
Tiny Mix Tapes	4/5 stars

Lucas is the second album released by the Ghostly International artist Skeletons. It was the first under their new name of Skeletons and the Kings of All Cities which was released in 2007.

== Background ==
The album was named after Lucas, Kansas. A common theme on the album is hair.

The band's sound on the album has been compared to Animal Collective, Gang Gang Dance, Excepter, Tortoise, the Sea and Cake, and Sufjan Stevens' the Age of Adz.

== Track listing ==
All tracks composed by Matthew Mehlan

1. "What They Said" – 5:02
2. "Fake Tits" – 3:34
3. "Hay W'happns?" – 5:17
4. "Don't Worry" – 10:50
5. "The Shit From the Dogs" – 3:13
6. "Like It Or Not" – 3:40
7. "Let It Out" – 2:55
8. "Sickness" – 4:45
9. "Push 'im Out" – 19:37
  - Contains about seven minutes of silence

== Personnel ==
=== Performers ===
- Mikey Ames (drums)
- Erik Carlson (violin)
- Peter Evans (trumpet)
- Glenda Goodman (viola)
- Carsion Halegar (bass)
- Jeremy Keller (guitar)
- Sam Kulik (trumpet)
- Jon Leland (percussion)
- Jason McMahon (guitar)
- Matthew Mehlan (vocals, guitar, electronics)
- Cyrus Pireh (alto saxophone)

=== Art ===
- Justin Craun
