= In Decay, Too =

2020 compilation album by Com Truise

Compilation album by Com Truise
- Released: December 4, 2020
- Genre: Synthwave
- Label: Ghostly International
- Producer: Com Truise

Com Truise chronology
Persuasion System (2019)	In Decay, Too (2020)

In Decay, Too is a compilation album by American electronic musician Seth Haley's project Com Truise, released on December 4, 2020, by the independent record label Ghostly International. The record is a collection of tracks that, before its release, were previously unheard by fans, similarly to his previous compilation album, In Decay. The collection was assembled by Polychora, an archivist of Com Truise's material dating back to his Komputer Cast days. Lead track off the album is "False Ascendancy," released on October 14, 2020. It was followed by "Compress—Fuse", released on November 18.

== Reception ==
Paul Simpson, reviewing the album for AllMusic, gave the album 3.5/5 stars, writing, "In Decay, Too delivers more or less what fans would expect, but it does show off his range a bit more than some of his other releases."

== Track listing ==
Songwriting, production and album artwork by Seth Haley.

1. "Zeta"
2. "Compress—Fuse"
3. "Chemical Legs"
4. "Reciprocity"
5. "She melts"
6. "Trying Times for the Indirect"
7. "I Dream (for You)"
8. "Surf"
9. "Galactic Melt"
10. "Post Hawaii"
11. "Peach (6809)"
12. "False Ascendancy"
13. "Constant Fracture"
14. "Trajectory"

== Charts ==
Chart (2020)	Peak position
US Top Current Album Sales (Billboard)	57
US Top Dance Albums (Billboard)	8
US Heatseekers Albums (Billboard)	13
US Independent Albums (Billboard)	14
