= Disco Nouveau =

Compilation album by Ghostly International
- Released: 2002
- Recorded: 2000–2002
- Genre: Electronic / dance
- Length: -m -s
- Label: Ghostly International
- Producer: Various Artists

Ghostly International chronology
Disco Nouveau (2002)	Idol Tryouts (2003)

Professional ratings
Review scores
Source	Rating
Allmusic	4.5/5 stars

Disco Nouveau is the first compilation album of Ann Arbor, Michigan record label Ghostly International. Released in 2002, the album served as a modern update of Giorgio Moroder's famed Italo disco sound of the 1970s and 1980s and includes contributions from artists such as Solvent, ADULT., and Susumu Yokota. It served as a major inspiration to the (at the time) burgeoning electroclash movement and has been praised for its persistent relevance in much the same way as Moroder himself.

== Disco Nouveau Track listing ==
1. Daniel Wang "Pistol Oderso"
2. ADULT. "Nite Life"
3. Legowelt "Disco Rout"
4. Solvent "My Radio"
5. I-F featuring Nancy Fortune "Holographic Voice"
6. DMX Krew featuring Tracy "Make Me"
7. Perspects "They Keep Dancing"
8. Ectomorph "Lost Angles"
9. Susumu Yokota "Re: Disco"
10. Mat-101 "Haunted House"
11. Charles Manier "Change You"
12. Lowfish "No Longer Accepting Complaints"
13. Hong Kong Counterfeit "Metal Disco Rmx"
14. Memory Boy "There Is No Electricity"
