= My Radio =

My Radio may refer to:

- "My Radio", 1995 song by J.K.
- "My Radio", 1996 song by Sandra Chambers
- "My Radio", song by Stars from Nightsongs
- "My Radio", song by Solvent on Ghostly International's 2002 compilation album Disco Nouveau
- "My Radio", song by Deborah Cox from Deborah Cox
- "My Radio", song by Shaya
- "My Radio", song by the band Pavement from Westing (By Musket and Sextant)
