= Silicon Tare =

2016 EP by Com Truise

EP by Com Truise
- Released: April 1, 2016
- Length: 21:46
- Label: Ghostly International
- Producer: Seth Haley

Com Truise chronology
Wave 1 (2014)	Silicon Tare (2016)	Iteration (2017)

Singles from Silicon Tare
- 1. "Diffraction" Released: February 10, 2016; 2. "Silicon Tare" Released: March 10, 2016

Silicon Tare is the fourth extended play by American musician Seth Haley under his stage name Com Truise. It was released on April 1, 2016, by Ghostly International. Haley described his releases as Com Truise as parts of a sci-fi story about the world's first "synthetic astronaut", which started on his first studio album, Galactic Melt (2011), and Silicon Tare is where the astronaut makes contact with the Wave 1 colony. The EP was influenced in part by Haley moving to the West Coast.

Silicon Tare comprises five tracks and is considered by critics to be "warmer" and "faster" than previous releases. The EP was promoted with two singles and earned generally positive reviews, but received criticism for being too similar to previous releases. Commercially, it reached the fourth position on Billboard's Dance/Electronic Albums chart.

== Background and release ==
Silicon Tare is part of a sci-fi story created by Seth Haley about "Earth's first synthetic astronaut", which began on Haley's debut album, Galactic Melt (2011), and continued in his Wave 1 (2014) EP. According to Ghostly International, the label on which Haley's albums are released, this is where the story "takes a dark turn". At the conclusion of Wave 1, the astronaut successfully makes contact with the "Wave 1 colony". However, "things get fuzzy. He falls in love; there is a war coming. A story that began in hope and dreams of discovery ends on an uncertain note. Change is in the air." Silicon Tare was the second last release of the story, with the last one being Haley's second studio album, Iteration (2017).

Haley declared that some tracks of the EP were "a little older", while others were influenced by him moving from the East Coast to the West Coast because it "has its own weird magic to it." His studio on the West Coast was a house he rented from a friend. He described the studio as poorly organized and, at the time, a work in progress. He explained that "[i]t was more an experiment for me to try to do something that sounds like me, but different, to keep the door open for the future of the Com Truise project."

On February 10, 2016, he announced Silicon Tare, releasing "Diffraction" as the lead single. Exactly one month later, Haley released the title track of the album. Silicon Tare was released on April 1, 2016, by Ghostly International.

== Composition ==
AllMusic's Paul Simpson said that the EP has "faster, more urgent tempos than any previous Com Truise release." In an interview, Haley said that the EP felt "a little warmer" than previous releases because of an update on the software he uses to create music, making it sound "a little bit more open". According to Ghostly, the album presents his "always-cinematic signature sound" and "4/4 kick drum patterns" with "colorful and varied" tempos and dynamics.

Silicon Tare opens with "Sunspot", with "its soft-pink tone, synthetic slap bass and quasi-808 percussion [recalling] the edgier end of '80s pop." It then progresses to "Forgive", with "fat streaks of synth and a gleefully hectic rhythm track that stops, starts and sputters over and over again." The third track is "Diffraction", described as "a cosmic pinball machine of scattered synth". "Diffraction" is followed by the title track, "where the relationship between the low, bass-thuds and the glistening high notes are at their most entangled and emotive." The EP closes with "du Zirconia", a "meticulously-crafted build-up tune."

== Critical reception ==
Professional ratings
Aggregate scores
Source	Rating
Metacritic	68/100
Review scores
Source	Rating
AllMusic	4/5 stars
Exclaim!	6/10
The Line of Best Fit	7/10
Pitchfork	5.9/10
PopMatters	6/10
Tiny Mix Tapes	3/5 discs

On review aggregator Metacritic, Silicon Tare has a rating of 68/100, indicating "generally favorable reviews". AllMusic's Paul Simpson considered it "his most technologically advanced recording to date, doing without the hazy, grainy textures he's become known for", with a high-quality sound. Rob Arcand wrote to Tiny Mix Tapes that the EP resembled 2010, "which could be a good thing, depending on how you look at it." Marc Hogan of Pitchfork criticized it by writing that it did "little" to expand on the songs' initial ideas.

Some critics noted similarities between Silicon Tare and previous releases. Luke Pearson wrote to Exclaim! that it "sounds like an artist perfecting his style as opposed to developing it". Hogan felt that the EP didn't significantly differ from previous releases, "so if you liked [them] there's little here to find too upsetting". However, John Bell declared to The Line of Best Fit that the album was "a little more energetic" than previous releases and described it as "very strong [...] energetic and intense, [promising] a high-octane finale." According to PopMatters' Colin Fitzgerald, Haley was limiting himself "by never abandoning his comfort zone", and concluded the review by saying that Silicon Tare "is a Com Truise EP for Com Truise fans".

== Track listing ==
All tracks were composed and performed by Seth Haley as Com Truise.

No.	Title	Length
1.	"Sunspot"	4:04
2.	"Forgive"	3:26
3.	"Diffraction"	4:13
4.	"Silicon Tare"	4:02
5.	"du Zirconia"	5:58
Total length:		21:46

== Charts ==
Chart (2016)	Peak position
US Top Dance Albums (Billboard)	4
