= American Automatic =

Studio album by Kill Memory Crash
- Released: March 17, 2005
- Genres: Electronic, industrial techno
- Length: 50:50
- Label: Ghostly International

Kill Memory Crash chronology
| When the Blood Turns Black (2003) | American Automatic (2005) | Of Fire (2008) |

Singles from American Automatic
- 1. "Never Forget" Released: February 24, 2004; 2. "Crash V8" Released: March 8, 2005; 3. "The O" Released: July 6, 2005

American Automatic is the debut studio album by Kill Memory Crash, an American electronic duo based in Chicago, Illinois. It was released on March 17, 2005, through Ghostly International.

== Background ==
In the 1990s, Kill Memory Crash started making music, under the group name Feed the Machine. The group then changed its name from Feed the Machine to Kill Memory Crash. The duo's debut EP, When the Blood Turns Black, was released in 2003. The duo's debut studio album, American Automatic, was released in 2005.

== Critical reception ==
Professional ratings
Review scores
| Source | Rating |
|---|---|
| AllMusic | 4.5/5 stars |
| Pitchfork | 4.9/10 |

Timothy Pittz of Westword commented that the album "further synthesizes the techno and industrial hybrid, with heavy beats that assault the senses rather than seduce them." Brad Filicky of CMJ New Music Monthly stated, "Chicago's Kill Memory Crash explore IDM's creepiest corner, but hangs onto a cyperpunk punch with (sharp) teeth." He added, "American Automatic has all the moody gloom of industrial and IDM's fresh feeling of experimentation and is sure to please both camps." Mike Adair of Exclaim! commented that they "offer a sound that captures the genuine spirit behind old school industrial music, yet maintains a level of modern accessibility."

Peter Nicholson of XLR8R stated, "Tired monotones aside, American Automatic thrums with energetic dismay, with dark and gleaming digital details pogoing between machine drums." Rob Theakston of AllMusic commented that the album "recalls classic moments from the Wax Trax imprint without diving headfirst into the convenient nostalgia that plagues so many industrial bands and has kept the genre in an infinite loop of mediocrity for nearly a decade." He added, "With its relentless energy and unforgiving abrasiveness, American Automatic raises the bar for what industrial dance music should sound like in the 21st century."

== In other media ==
The song "Crash V8" is featured in the video game Forza Motorsport 2 (2007).

== Track listing ==
| No. | Title | Length |
|---|---|---|
| 1. | "Riyout" | 5:30 |
| 2. | "American Automatic" | 3:03 |
| 3. | "Crash V8" | 4:24 |
| 4. | "Doorway Nine" | 6:00 |
| 5. | "UTIU" | 4:07 |
| 6. | "The O" | 6:08 |
| 7. | "Never Forget" | 6:11 |
| 8. | "Demento" | 5:26 |
| 9. | "Battery" | 5:33 |
| 10. | "Push" | 4:28 |
| Total length: | | 50:50 |
