= Legowelt =

Dutch electronic musician

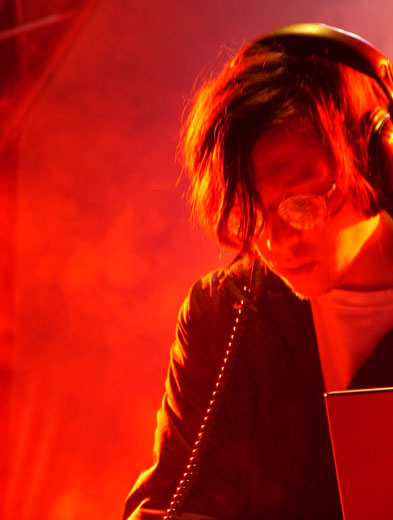

Background information
- Also known as: Danny Wolfers
- Origin: Scheveningen, The Hague, Netherlands
- Genres: Electronic music, techno, electro, lo-fi house, ambient
- Years active: 1990s–present
- Labels: Bunker, Gold Coast, Strange Life, Ghostly International, Cocoon, L.I.E.S.

Legowelt (real name Danny Wolfers) is a Dutch electronic musician, composer and visual artist, whose music spans a varying range of sub-genres.

== Life ==
Danny Wolfers was born in The Hague, The Netherlands and grew up in the coastal neighbourhood of Scheveningen.

== Career ==
=== Music ===
Danny Wolfers has released projects on various labels and under over 40 different aliases, including on Bunker records, Clone, P.P.U., UTTU, Cocoon Recordings, Ghostly, Viewlexx, Dekmantel, and Rush Hour.

Around 1999, Legowelt started releasing a number of LPs and EPs on The Hague's Bunker Records. Bunker released Legowelt's first vinyl album Pimpshifter.

In 2002, the German music magazine Groove voted Legowelt's Disco Rout track of the year. Disco Rout was originally released on a Ghostly International compilation, and was subsequently licensed by Cocoon Recordings for a full vinyl release.

Apart from producing, Legowelt tours and performs all over the world.

==== Strange Life Records and Nightwind Records ====
In 2004, Wolfers founded record label Strange Life Records, self-releasing under the Legowelt moniker, but also various aliases such as Smackos, Franz Falckenhaus and Klaus Weltman. Strange Life Records also released albums and EPs by artists including DJ Overdose, DMX Krew and Ian Martin. Strange Life Records was operative until 2010.

In 2014, Wolfers founded Nightwind Records "releasing cassettes, cd’s, digital, graphic novels, zines and vinyl LP’s".

==== Aliases ====
Danny Wolfers has released albums and EP's under over 40 different aliases including: Alchemulator, Bontempi 666, Calimex Mental Implant Corp., Commanding The Beast, Coverti World, Danny Wolfers, Dickie Smabers & Moerwijk Crew, Florenza Mavelli, Franz Falckenhaus, Gladio, House Of Jezebel, Klaus Weltman, Lords Of Midnite, Nacho Patrol, Nomad Ninja, Occult Orientated Crime, Phalangius, Polarius, Ray Escortienda, Rising Sun Systems, Saab Knutson, Salamandos, Sammy Osmo, Satomi Taniyama, Seaside Houz Boyz, Smackos, Squadra Blanco, Star Shepherd, Tandy Ogmo, The Psychic Stewardess, Twilight Moose, Ufocus, Venom 18, and Westside Box Savants.

==== Sound design ====
Wolfers has worked with various international synthesizer companies, including Novation (Peak, Summit, and Circuit Tracks), Roland (D-05), and Moog, designing preset patches. In 2021, Polyend released a limited Legowelt special-edition stand-alone hardware tracker, which includes more than 5000 customs sounds created by Wolfers, as well as a custom faceplate designed by Wolfers. Wolfers also designed sounds for video games such as Next Space Rebels and Hexagroove: Tactical DJ for Nintendo Switch and Xbox.

==== Free samples packs ====
Since 2013, Legowelt has been making sample packs available for free on his website, to be used by other artists in their productions. The sample packs include custom sounds programmed from both well-known and more obscure synthesizers, including the Oberheim Matrix 1000, Roland Jupiter-8, JV-2080, JD-800, Juno-106, Quasimidi Sirius, Kawai K4, Moog Minimoog, E-mu Vintage Pro, Yamaha PSS-380, PSS-795, SY35, Korg Electribe ER-1, Korg Mono/Poly, and several FM synthesizers such as the Yamaha DX100, DX200, TX81Z, DX21, DX7 and DX5.

==== Astro Unicorn Radio ====
From 2007 to 2011, Danny Wolfers hosted a radio show titled Astro Unicorn Radio which aired on Intergalactic FM. The show featured obscure music and interviews with artists such as Ron Morelli, founder of L.I.E.S., and Veronica Vasicka, founder of Minimal Wave Records.

==== Ballet composition ====
In 2024, Danny Wolfers composed music for the Ballet “Aju” performed by dancers from the Estonian National Ballet, and The Horn Collective, in collaboration with Sander Mölder and Timo Steiner. Wolfers also composed a piece for a second ballet performed by the Tähtvere Dance Centre, at the Leigo Lake Music festival near Tartu, Estonia, in August 2024. Both ballets were choreographed by Estonian choreographer Teet Kask.

=== Shadow Wolf Cyberzine ===
Since 2014 Danny Wolfers publishes every year an online cyberzine written in ASCII which features articles, reviews, DIY manuals, studios tips, music interviews, games and ASCII art by Danny Wolfers and guest contributors. The Shadow Wolf Cyberzine is published yearly around the end of the year. In 2020 and 2021, compilation 'cover tapes' were released alongside the Shadow Wolf Cyberzine featuring several artists including Dim Garden, Baglover, Alina Valentina, DJ Overdose, Franziska Lantz, Huren, Chupacabras, Jentlemen, and Elektrovolt. The term ‘cover tape’ stems from 1980's and 1990's magazine culture when printed magazines came with a cassette or CD containing music or software.

=== Artwork ===
Danny Wolfers produces paintings and drawings which have been used for his music releases and which have been exhibited.

In 2016 Danny Wolfers held a drawing competition centred around the theme of "the world of Nightwind Records" with as a first prize a vintage 1987 Yahama PSS 570 FM synthesizer, and other prizes including Legowelt CDs, tapes, t-shirt, and stickers. In 2021, another drawing competition was held, which had as prizes a Casio SK1 sampling keyboard, a Yamaha PSS 380 FM synthesizer, and an electro acoustic kalimba, among other prizes. All art entries were published on the Legowelt official website.

In 2017 Danny Wolfers published a 24-page printed graphic novel, accompanying the album Unfolding the Future with Amateur Space Jazz released under the name Danny Wolfers.

In 2022, Danny Wolfers collaborated with internet artist Rafael Rozendaal on Polychrome Music by designing a "generative music system that plays an infinite composition on 3 different audio channels, each with their own synthesizer". Polychrome Music was published on 24 August 2022 on Artblocks and was exhibited from 21 April to 20 August 2023 at the Museum Folkwang in Essen, Germany.

=== Animation ===
In 2021 Danny Wolfers founded Nightwind Animation Studios, through which he produced and published his first full-length animation titled "Ambient Trip Commander". Ambient Trip Commander premiered on 7 May 2022 at the Eye Film Museum in Amsterdam and has been screened in several venues with live soundtracking by Legowelt. The running time is 65 minutes of original frame-by-frame animation hand drawn by Danny Wolfers using watercolours and fineliners. Ambient Trip Commander took 14 months to complete. In late 2022, Wolfers made the entire film, which is a self-funded grassroots production, available online on his YouTube channel.

In November 2024, Wolfers published a hand drawn animated video clip for the song "In a Blaze of Fame" from the album "A Field Guide to the Void", depicting two fictional characters Wombald and Slorpy.
