= Fucking Consumer =

Album by I-F

Studio album by I-F
- Released: 4 May 1998
- Genre: Electro; Techno
- Length: 73:19
- Label: Disko B

Professional ratings
Review scores
Source	Rating
Allmusic	link
Montreal Mirror	link

Fucking Consumer is an album by electronic music artist I-F. It was released in 1998 by Disko B records, and re-released in 2004 by EFA records. The song End Theme features a cameo by vocalist Gitane Demone of the gothic rock band Christian Death.

== Track listing ==
1. "Space Invaders Are Smoking Grass" (Ferenc Van Der Sluijs) – 6:08
2. "Theme from Sunwheel Beachbar" (Lonny "Lookout" Eyes) – 6:21
3. "I Do Because I Couldn't Care Less" (Eyes) – 5:08
4. "Spiegelbeeld" (Eyes) – 6:56
5. "Playstation No. 1 (instrumental)" (Eyes) – 5:01
6. "Daddy Says" (Eyes) – 0:30
7. "Torment" (Eyes) – 6:38
8. "Energy Vampire" (Eyes) – 6:58
9. "Disko Slique (instrumental)" (Eyes) – 5:36
10. "Cry" (I-F, Nimoy) – 6:28
11. "Assault on Radical Radio" (Eyes) – 4:51
12. "The Man With the Stick" (Eyes) – 7:30
13. "Endtheme" (Gitane Demone, Eyes) – 5:14
