= Wave 1 =

EP by Com Truise
- Released: February 18, 2014
- Genre: Electronic
- Length: 28:07
- Label: Ghostly International
- Producer: Com Truise

Com Truise chronology
In Decay (2012)	Wave 1 (2014)	Silicon Tare (2016)

Singles from Wave 1
- 1. "Declination" Released: December 3, 2013

Wave 1 is the third extended play by the American musician Seth Haley as Com Truise. Haley described his releases as Com Truise as parts of a story about the world's first "Synthetic Astronaut" on his adventure to a planet, and Wave 1 is where he lands on a kind-of replica of Earth. Musically, Haley had to get inspiration from several artists as this part of the story is also where the music starts to change.

The EP is a combination of styles including synth soul, drum and bass, synth funk and electro, and retains the bright and danceable vibe from Com Truise's debut album Galactic Melt (2011). Promoted with two pre-EP track releases, a music video for the track "Subsonic" and a February–March 2014 tour, the EP was issued on the Ghostly International label in February 2014 to generally positive reviews, with critics praising the record's creativity. Commercially, it also landed in the top ten of the American Billboard Dance/Electronic and Heatseekers album charts.

== Background and composition ==
In a June 2013 Twitter post, Seth Haley said he wrote Wave 1 without knowing it was a reflection of how he was living in the few months of his life before. He started taking care of his health, suffered through an ended relationship, and relocated to Brooklyn. He said that despite not usually revealing his personal life publicly, he said in an interview that when he makes his music, : "it's always just there, and it happens, but I don't focus on it. My music's all based on this story about an android that travels to this other planet. So I'm not really writing about myself, but then I realized I have been all along. It's all been about me."

Maintaining the bright and danceable feel from Com Truise's 2011 debut studio album Galactic Melt and garnering more of a melodic approach than previous releases of the project, Wave 1 is a combination of synth soul, drum and bass, synth funk, electro, and, in the words of a Pitchfork Media reviewer, "fussy 80s computer-pop". Seth Haley has described the character of Com Truise as the first ever "Synthetic Astronaut", and each release under the name shows the next part in this voyage to a planet. Wave 1 is a part of the story where he lands on a sort-of replica of Earth, and Haley thought there was "something eerie about it, something familiar but something peculiar as well." Because this was also meant to be a part of the story where the music starts changing, he had taken inspiration from several acts including New Order and Prince to have a much broader range of tempos and styles in each track.

== Tracks ==
The opener "Wasat" sets the scene of the story, starting with a short, atmospheric prelude before it moves into "an uptempo, hypercolor groove". The "VHS-quality dubstep" track "Mind" is where the record gets suspenseful, as the drums "threaten" to become, but doesn't entirely become, a fully developed hard-hitting four-on-the-floor beat. These two tracks were described by a Spectrum Culture critic as "a practice in coalescence; taking a moment to take shape and then defying one another’s difference until they too find their peaceful plane of existence." The most melodic track on the EP, "Declination", as well as probably the "most straightforwardly melodic" cut in Com Truise's discography as of the release of the EP, "glides into your headphones like a starship slipping down out of hyperspace", featuring vocals of Joel Ford from the projects Ford & Lopatin, Airbird and Young Ejecta. As a reviewer analyzed, the track opens as "spine-tingling sci-fi dissonance" before turning into a 1980s-esque new wave song.

Wave 1 decreases its tensions on "Subsonic", which goes through several "movements" of slow-building, evocative sounds, including a "hell of a squelchy bass", that the press release analogized to be "soundtracking" the creation of new stars. This evocative vibe continues into "Valis Called (Control)", its title referencing the works of one of the considered "gods of this retro synth phenomenon" Philip K. Dick, followed by the "futuristic R&B" song "Meserere Mei", a track consisting of broken drum beats and spiky synth sounds. The Jamie xx-style title track of Wave 1 calmly ends the EP as the lead melody drifts far away into several "zipping" sci-fi textures and "clustered percussion."

== Promotion and release ==
The lead single for Wave 1 was "Declination", released on December 3, 2013. On January 23, 2014, "Subsonic" premiered on the website of Spin magazine, which announced the EP's track list and a North American tour promoting the record that lasted from February 11 to March 15. The EP was officially distributed on the Ghostly International label on February 18. On April 14, Vice magazine's electronic music channel Thump premiered the video for "Subsonic". Directed by Hans Lo, Thump summarized that the video "jacks us into a William Gibson novel, leading us through the gridded passages of the Information Superhighway."

== Critical reception ==
Professional ratings
Aggregate scores
Source	Rating
Metacritic	69/100
Review scores
Source	Rating
AllMusic	3.5/5 stars
Consequence of Sound	B-
Exclaim!	7/10
NME	6/10
Pitchfork Media	6.7/10
Spectrum Culture	2.75/5 stars
Sputnikmusic	3.7/5
The Washington Post	(favorable)
XLR8R	6.5/10

Wave 1 received generally positive reviews upon its release; the EP holds a weighted mean of an aggregate 69 out of 100 from Metacritic based on six reviews, indicating that, according to the site, the album's critical reception was favorable in general. Daniel Sylvester of Exclaim! called the EP "looser, more focused and much more imaginative" that Com Truise's past work, writing that while the artist has yet to make "a truly transcendent piece of art, Wave 1 shows the young beatmaker in transition, fearlessly searching for his definitive sound." Similarly, Sputnikmusic reviewer hyperion praised Wave 1 for making a unique new sound with the chillwave palette instead of having limits from the genre, assuming that it could've been the peak of the microgenre if the record's other songs were as good as "Valis Called (Control)" and "Subsonic". Mark Jenkins reviewed it for The Washington Post, and mainly highlighted its unpredictable melodic and rhythmic moments, while Pat Levy, reviewing for Consequence of Sound, honored Haley for getting out of his comfort zone while still having the same sounds and style of his past records. Pitchfork Media's Paul Thompson liked the EP as "a mostly welcome return," but criticized its focus of having perfectly detailed sound instead of new musical ideas.

In more mixed reviews, Derek Staples, writing for the site Spectrum Culture, wrote that with Wave 1, the artist was starting to lose his "inventive edge" in trying to recreate the same sound of his past releases for nostalgic purposes. A NME critic praised the sounds on the EP, but called it more "disjointed" and "disorienting" than his past albums due to its "abrasive" and glitchy sound and lack of a "steady groove." A reviewer for the magazine XLR8R wrote that Wave 1 may interest listeners, but also was an indication Com Truise's creativity may decline with releases in his later career.

== Track listing ==
All tracks are written by Seth Haley

No.	Title	Length
1.	"Wasat"	1:58
2.	"Mind"	4:16
3.	"Declination" (featuring Joel Ford)	4:28
4.	"Subsonic"	4:39
5.	"Valis Called (Control)"	4:42
6.	"Miserere Mei"	4:02
7.	"Wave 1"	4:02
Total length:		28:07

== Credits and personnel ==
- Songwriting, production, artwork – Com Truise
- Vocals on "Declination" – Joel Ford

== Release history ==
Region	Date	Format(s)	Label
Worldwide	February 18, 2014	Digital download; vinyl	Ghostly International

== Charts ==
Chart (2014)	Peak position
US Top Dance Albums (Billboard)	7
US Heatseekers Albums (Billboard)	6
