= Kill Memory Crash =

- Origin: Chicago, Illinois, United States
- Genres: Electronic; industrial techno
- Years active: 1998–present
- Labels: Ghostly International; Spectral Sound; Underground, Inc.
- Members: Alex SanFaçon; Adam Sieczka; Gabriel Palomo
- Website: www.killmemorycrash.com

Kill Memory Crash, formerly known as Feed the Machine, is an American electronic band. Originally from Detroit, Michigan, it is based in Chicago, Illinois. The group's debut studio album, American Automatic, was released in 2005 through Ghostly International.

== History ==
Kill Memory Crash was originally formed around 1998 as a duo (Alex SanFaçon and Adam Sieczka), and made an almost self-imposed exile from the music industry due to their indifferences to the popular styles of electronic music at the time. Kill Memory Crash eventually became known for their subversive lyrical themes and dark musical style, blurring the boundaries between industrial, techno, electro, pop, and rock.

The duo signed with Ghostly International in 2002, and released its debut EP, When the Blood Turns Black, in 2003. The duo's debut studio album, American Automatic, was released in 2005. In 2008, they were joined by live percussionist (and DJ) Gabriel Palomo of Zuvuya Recordings, who was introduced to them through a mutual friend.

Kill Memory Crash continues to perform at select international venues/events and is rumored to be working on new material for 2013.

== Members ==
- Alex SanFaçon – electronics, production
- Adam Sieczka (Adam Killing) – synthesizer, vocals
- Gabriel Palomo – live percussion

== Discography ==
=== Studio albums ===
- American Automatic (Ghostly International, 2005)

=== EPs ===
- When the Blood Turns Black (Ghostly International, 2003)
- Of Fire (Ghostly International, 2008)

=== Singles ===
- "Never Forget" (Ghostly International, 2004)
- "Crash V8" (Ghostly International, 2005)
- "The O" (Ghostly International, 2005)

=== Remixes ===
- Saul Williams – "List of Demands (Reparations) (Kill Memory Crash Remix)" (Wichita, 2004)
- Chemlab – "Binary Nation (Demento Mix)" (Invisible/Underground, Inc., 2006)

=== Collaborations ===
- Franz & Shape – "Eyes Like Knives" (Relish Recordings, 2007)

=== Compilation album appearances ===
- Idol Tryouts: Ghostly International Vol. 1 ("Get Out", Ghostly International, 2003)
- Idol Tryouts: Ghostly International Vol. 2 ("Press + Burn", Ghostly International, 2006)
- Ghostly Swim ("Hit + Run", Ghostly International/Williams Street Records, 2008)
