= Git (album) =

Studio album by Skeletons & The Girl-Faced Boys
- Released: June 28, 2005
- Recorded: ??
- Genre: Indie rock/Electronica
- Length: 38:10
- Label: Ghostly International
- Producer: Matt Mehlan, Leif Shackleford, Tony Lowe

Professional ratings
Review scores
Source	Rating
Allmusic	link
Pitchfork Media	(7.0/10) 7/6/2005 link

Git is the first album by Skeletons & The Girl-Faced Boys though the band had previously released material under the name "Skeletons". It was released on Ghostly International in July 2005.

== Track listing ==
1. "See the Way" – 2:45
2. "Git" – 2:52
3. "We Won't Be Proud, No No No No" – 4:30
4. "There's a Fly in Your Soup and I Put It There" – 4:47
5. "Y'all Thinks It's Soo Easy" – 1:59
6. "There Are Seagulls Who Live in Parking Lots" – 5:09
7. "You'da Been Better Off" – 5:32
8. "While We Were at the Movies" – 2:15
9. "Do You Feel Any Better?" – 8:16
