= Ginger Root (music project) =

American indie soul music project

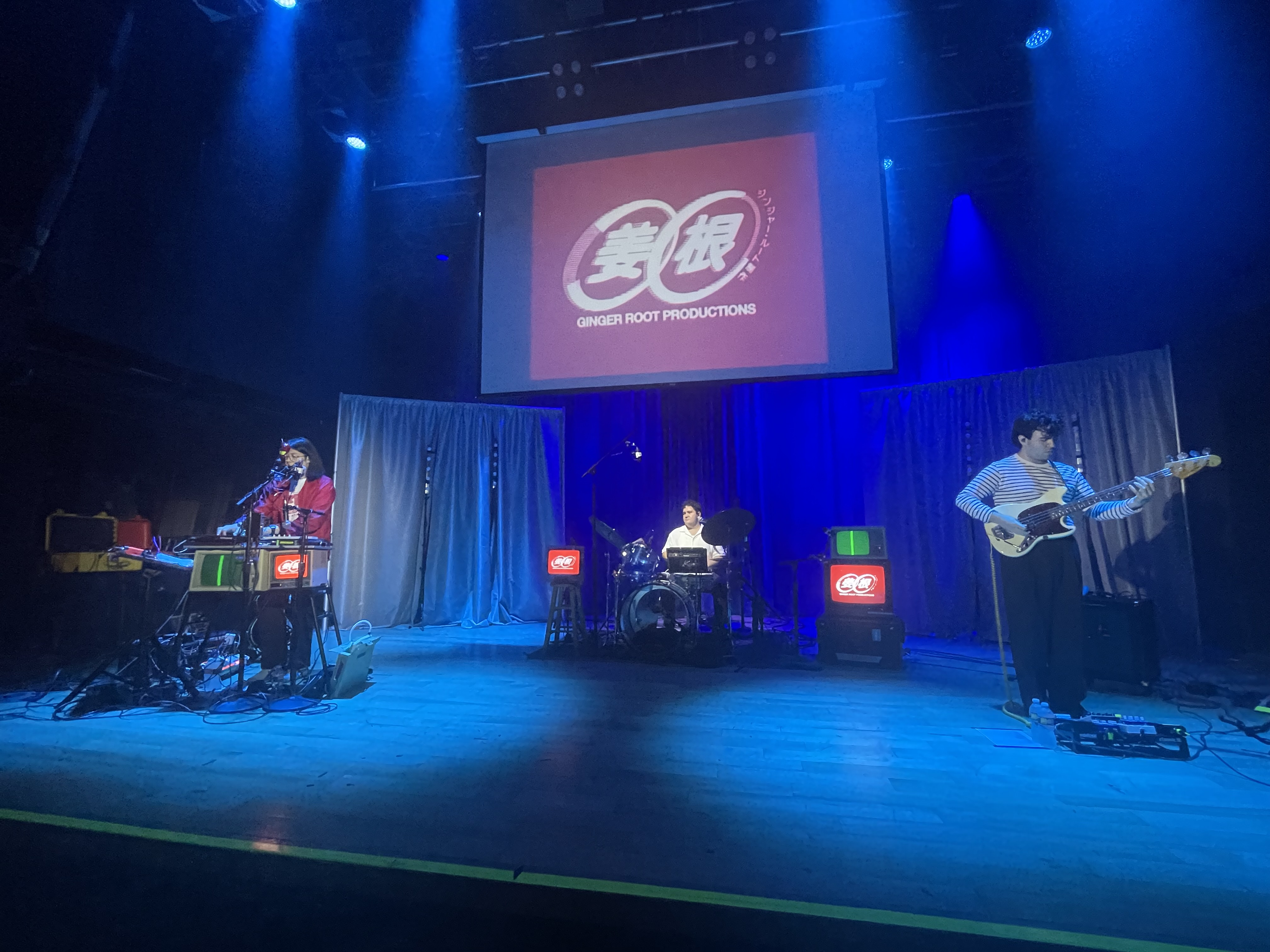
- Ginger Root performing in San Diego in 2024. From left to right - Lew, Carney, Hovis.

Background information
- Origin: Huntington Beach, California, US
- Genres: Soul; indie pop; elevator music; city pop
- Years active: 2017–present
- Labels: Clew; Acrophase; Ghostly International
- Spinoff of: Van Stock
- Members: Cameron Lew; Matt Carney (touring); Dylan Hovis (touring)
- Past members: Anthony Grisham (touring)
- Website: gingerrootmusic.com

Ginger Root (姜根) is an American indie soul music project from Huntington Beach, California, led by singer-songwriter and instrumentalist Cameron Lew (Chinese: 刘国明; born November 26, 1995). Lew has described the project's musical sound as "aggressive elevator soul", also citing inspiration as coming from groups such as Vulfpeck, Toro y Moi, White Denim, Yellow Magic Orchestra, and Feist. On tour, Ginger Root has supported bands such as Khruangbin, Hippo Campus, Omar Apollo, Last Dinosaurs, and Japanese Breakfast as well as headlining their own tour in Fall of 2022, with supporting artists King Pari, Vicky Farewell, and Amaiwana.

In the studio, Ginger Root consists of solely Lew. On tour, Ginger Root also currently includes Lew's high school friends Matt Carney (drums) and Dylan Hovis (bass).

The music of Ginger Root was released under Acrophase Records, with the exception of the newest album, Shinbangumi, which was released under Ghostly International.

== History ==
=== Formation, Spotlight People, and Toaster_music (2016–2017) ===
Ginger Root began as Lew was in the Huntington Beach-based band Van Stock. In mid-2016, he wrote a few songs that he felt did not fit into the band's existing sound and made an EP out of them. According to Lew, that EP "turned into an LP", becoming Spotlight People, and "I slapped the name Ginger Root on it", a name coming from a live Vulfpeck performance of "It Gets Funkier" he discovered on YouTube at 3 a.m. one morning, where frontman Jack Stratton chanted "uh, uh ginger root".

In 2017, Lew began a weekly YouTube series called "Toaster Music" where he performed covers in his 2004 Honda Element. Lew says the idea came to him from not wanting to do homework during the four hour break between his classes on Mondays at Chapman University, where he would record vocals, guitar, keyboard, bass, and drums in the backseat, mixing it on his laptop via the car stereo. Afterwards, he would spend another two to three hours editing during his next lecture. Many of these covers formed the basis for a compilation album, titled Toaster_music.

=== Mahjong Room and Rikki (2018–2020) ===
In June 2018, Ginger Root released a second album, Mahjong Room, featuring four previously released singles ("Two Step", "Call It Home", "Jeanie", and "Having Fun") and six other new songs. Alongside that release, Lew released a second album of covers from the ongoing "Toaster Music" project on Bandcamp, calling it Toaster_Music_v2.

The name "Mahjong Room" comes from a room Lew's great-grandmother had in her house, where all of his family members would gather, play Mahjong, and a five-year old Lew would come and try to shuffle the tiles. It eventually became somewhat of a storage room, the memory of it inspiring both the song and album, respectively.

In March 2020, Ginger Root released "Karaoke", the first single from their third album Rikki, which was originally slated to be released in June 2020, but was later delayed and released in October of that year due to complications from the COVID-19 pandemic. The name of the album Rikki is from the misspelling (as Lew remembers) of the first word of the book Tikki Tikki Tembo.

Toaster Music v3, the third iteration of covers from the "Toaster Music" project, was released on Ginger Root's Bandcamp in May 2020.

=== City Slicker and Nisemono (2021–2022) ===
In May 2021, Ginger Root announced via Twitter and Instagram the upcoming release of an EP, titled City Slicker, described by Lew as a soundtrack for the American adaptation of a fictitious 1980s Japanese film, expected to be released August 2021. Alongside the announcement, Ginger Root released a single from the EP, titled "Neighbor". Another single from the EP, "Loretta", was released in June 2021.

On July 21, 2021, Ginger Root released the single "Juban District", the name being a reference to the setting of the anime Sailor Moon. The album was released as a limited edition product on 2 analog physical formats, which were VHS and cassette tape. In November 2021, City Slicker was also released on vinyl through the crowd-funding/pre-sale service Qrates.

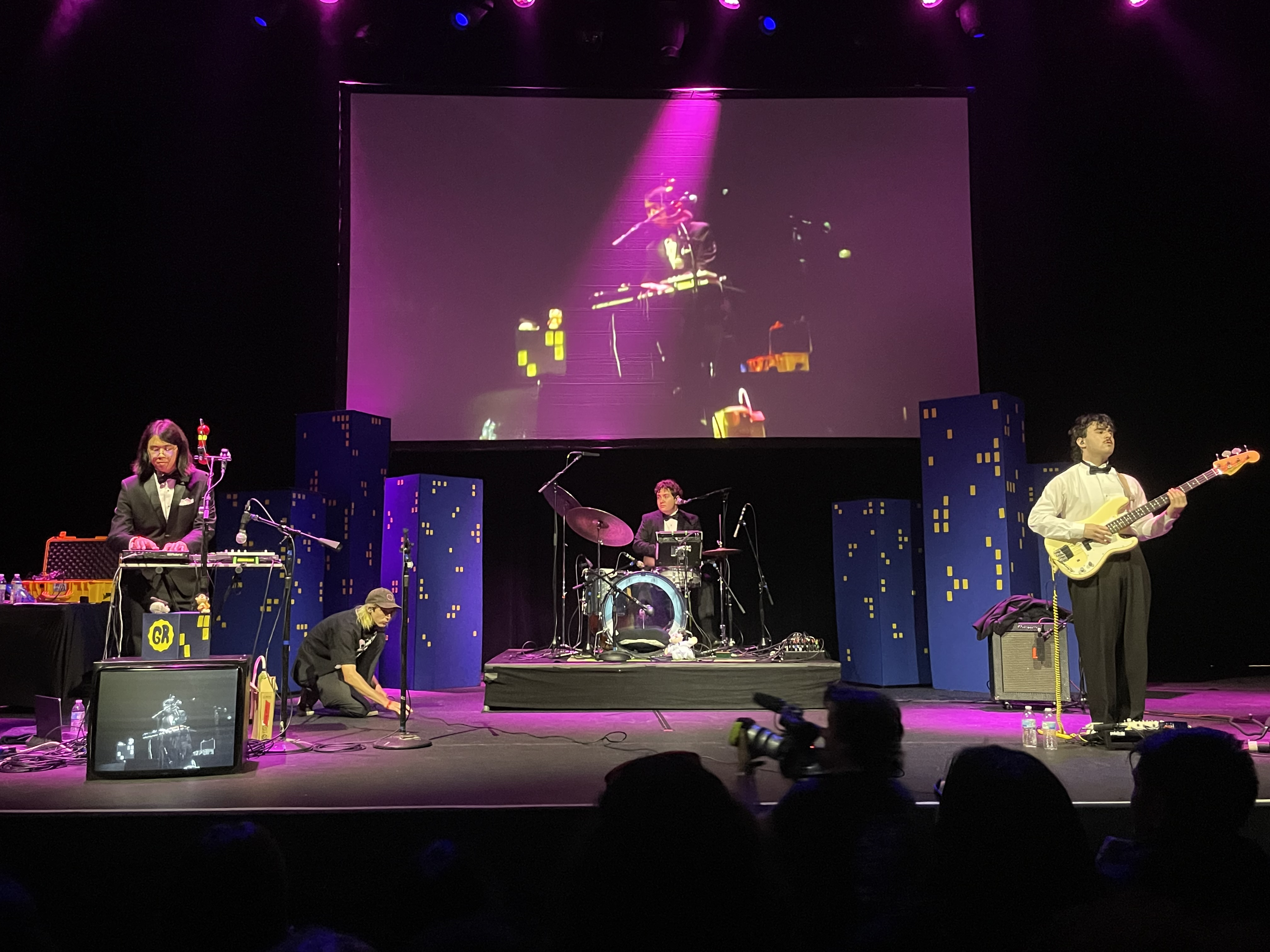
Ginger Root performing at the Novo in Los Angeles at the conclusion of their Nisemono Arc in 2023.

On June 14, 2022, Ginger Root announced another upcoming release of an EP titled Nisemono. The tracks are set in a fictitious 1983, where Ginger Root is asked to write and produce music for the up-and-coming Japanese pop idol, Kimiko Takeguchi. Right before Takeguchi's American debut on a late night show, she quits, leaving her manager in shambles. She makes the last minute decision to have Ginger Root perform in her place, since he knows all the songs. The EP focuses on imposter syndrome and not being oneself. It released on September 9, 2022, and also had a limited vinyl, CD and cassette release. Music critic Anthony Fantano listed Nisemono as his top EP released in 2022.

The music videos for both projects were filmed in Osaka and had their fidelity artificially reduced to better evoke the feeling of 1980s Japan.

=== Shinbangumi (2024) ===
In May 2024, Ginger Root announced that an album titled Shinbangumi (stylized in all caps as SHINBANGUMI) lit. transl. 'new program', would be released on September 13. This is Ginger Root's first project under the label Ghostly International. Five singles were released in advance of the album, titled "No Problems", "Better Than Monday", "There Was a Time", "All Night" and "Only You". The other songs released with the rest of the album are titled, "CM", "Kaze", "Giddy Up", "Think Cool", "Show 10", and "Take Me Back (Owakare No Jikan)". The group began a worldwide tour to promote the album in September 2024.

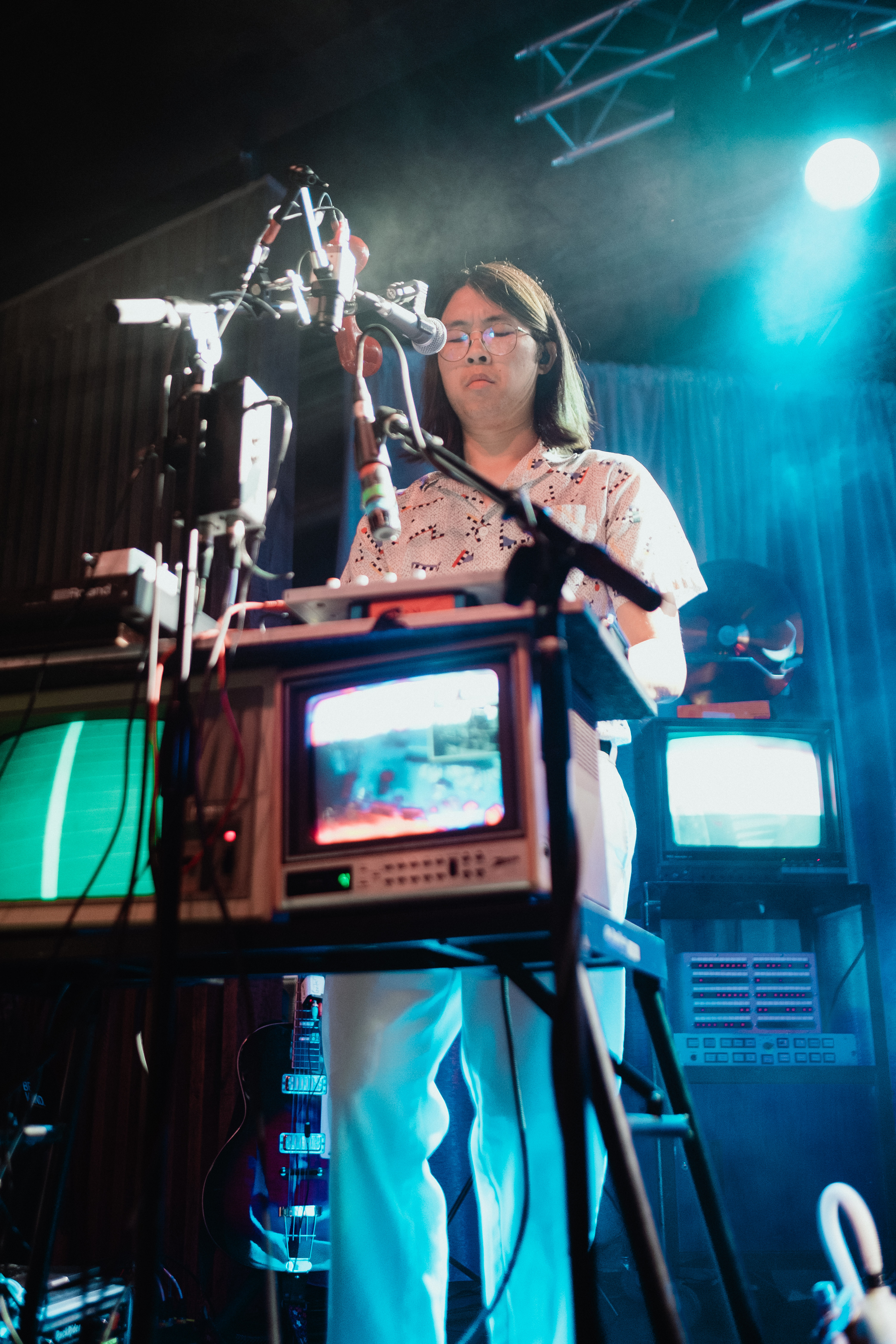
Cameron Lew of Ginger Root performing at Mahall's in Lakewood, Ohio 2024.

== Influences ==
In a 2023 interview, Lew credited Showa-era Japanese culture, including city pop artists Yellow Magic Orchestra, Taeko Onuki, Masayoshi Takanaka, and Tatsuro Yamashita, as a primary influence and sense of belonging as an Asian-American.

== Members ==
=== Studio ===
- Cameron Lew - vocals and all instruments, production (2017 - present)

=== Live ===
==== Current live musicians ====
- Cameron Lew - lead vocals, keyboards, synthesizers, guitar (2017 - present)
- Matthew Carney - backing vocals, drums (2017 - present)
- Dylan Hovis - bass guitar (2018 - present)
- David Gutel - videographer (2018 - present)

==== Former live musicians ====
- Anthony Grisham - bass guitar (2017 - 2018)

== Discography ==
=== Albums ===
| Title | Details | Peak chart positions |
| Title | Details | JPN Hot |
|---|---|---|
| Spotlight People | Released: January 1, 2017; Label: Self-released as Clew | — |
| Mahjong Room | Released: June 29, 2018; Label: Acrophase | — |
| Rikki | Released: October 23, 2020; Label: Acrophase | — |
| Shinbangumi | Released: September 13, 2024; Label: Ghostly International | 42 |

=== Live albums ===
| Title | Album details |
|---|---|
| Live from Istanbul | A collection of live recordings from February 9 and 10, 2019 while touring with Khruangbin.: Released: February 23, 2019; Label: Acrophase |

=== EPs ===
| Title | EP details |
|---|---|
| Toaster_music | Released: May 8, 2017; Label: Self-released as Clew |
| Toaster_Music_v2 | Released: June 29, 2018; Label: Self-released as Clew |
| Fresh Sounds of Ginger Root Vol. 1 | Released: December 21, 2019; Label: Self-released as Clew |
| Toaster Music v3 | Released: May 22, 2020; Label: Self-released as Clew |
| City Slicker | Released: August 20, 2021; Label: Acrophase |
| Nisemono | Released: September 9, 2022; Label: Acrophase |

=== Singles ===
==== As lead artist ====
| Title | Year | Album/EP |
|---|---|---|
| "Two Step" | 2017 | Mahjong Room |
| "Call It Home" | 2018 | Mahjong Room |
| "Jeanie" | 2018 | Mahjong Room |
| "Having Fun" | 2018 | Mahjong Room |
| "What Christmas Means to Me" (Stevie Wonder cover) | 2018 | Non-album singles |
| "Weather/Slump" | 2019 | Non-album singles |
| "B4" | 2019 | Non-album singles |
| "Karaoke" | 2020 | Rikki |
| "Out of State" | 2020 | Rikki |
| "Le château" | 2020 | Rikki |
| "Why Try" | 2020 | Rikki |
| "A Cruel Angel's Thesis" (Theme from Neon Genesis Evangelion) | 2021 | Non-album single |
| "Neighbor" | 2021 | City Slicker |
| "Loretta" | 2021 | City Slicker |
| "Juban District" | 2021 | City Slicker |
| "Loretta" (Japanese version) | 2021 | Non-album singles |
| "Linus n' Lucy" (Theme from Peanuts) | 2021 | Non-album singles |
| "Pi" | 2022 | Non-album singles |
| "Loneliness" | 2022 | Nisemono |
| "Holy Hell" | 2022 | Nisemono |
| "Over the Hill" | 2022 | Nisemono |
| "No Problems" | 2024 | Shinbangumi |
| "Better Than Monday" | 2024 | Shinbangumi |
| "There Was a Time" | 2024 | Shinbangumi |
| "All Night" | 2024 | Shinbangumi |
| "Only You" | 2024 | Shinbangumi |
| "Soarin'" | 2026 | Non-album single |

==== As featured artist ====
| Title | Year | Peak chart positions | Album |
| Title | Year | JPN | Album |
|---|---|---|---|
| "Love is Beautiful" (Rei featuring Ginger Root) | 2023 | 43 | VOICE |
