= Skeletons (band) =

- Origin: Oberlin, Ohio, USA
- Genres: Experimental music
- Years active: 2002–present
- Labels: Shinkoyo; Ghostly International; Tomlab
- Members: Matthew Mehlan; Jason McMahon; Tony Lowe; Jonathan Leland
- Past members: Carson Garhart; Cyrus Pireh; Severiano Martinez; Justin Craun; Mike Ames; Sam Kulik; Johnny Misheff
- Website: Official Site

Skeletons (also known as Skeletons and the Girl-Faced Boys, Skeletons and the Kings of All Cities, and Skeleton$) are an American entertainment unit from Oberlin, Ohio. They currently live in New York City.

Skeletons began as the solo project of Chicago native musician and filmmaker Matt Mehlan in 2001. In 2003, Mehlan released the albums Life and the Afterbirth and I'm At the Top of the World on Shinkoyo, an Oberlin College-based music collective known for its focus on group improvisation and DIY ethics. Following the name change from Skeletons to Skeletons & The Girl-Faced Boys and the addition of a rotating cast of collaborators, the full-length Git was released on Ghostly International Records in June 2005. In 2007, Skeletons released the album Lucas, also on Ghostly, under the name Skeletons and the Kings of All Cities. The album was recorded in the band's converted Queens warehouse studio and home, The Silent Barn.

Lucas was described by Pitchfork as "an outsize global-a-go-go mélange of unceasing polyrhythms, Afrobeat guitars, free jazz, and Timbaland's approach to kitchen-sink percussion."

A full-length entitled Money was released November 4, 2008, on Tomlab.

In 2009, Skeletons began playing occasional shows as a large ensemble titled Skeletons Big Band. Some of the compositions played by the Skeletons Big Band were eventually recorded and released on Skeletons' most recent album PEOPLE, released on April 26, 2011. The rest of the material from the Skeleton Big Band shows will be released later in 2011 for a Skeletons Big Band album.

Skeletons' most recent release was a full-length called If the Cat Come Back, released on September 11, 2020. The album features Mehlan playing a custom-built instrument called the "Shtar".

== Discography ==
- Everybody Dance With Your Steering Wheel, Self-Released, 2002
- Life and the Afterbirth, Shinkoyo, 2003
- I'm At The Top Of The World, Shinkoyo, 2004
- Git, Ghostly International, 2005
- Lucas, Ghostly International, 2007
- Deity of Hair, free release on skeletons.tv, 2007
- MONEY, Tomlab, 2008
- PEOPLE, Shinkoyo, 2011
- The Bus, Shinkoyo, 2012 (Skeleton$ Big Band)
- Am I Home?, Shinkoyo, 2016
- Soft Skills, Shinkoyo, 2016 (collaboration with Baby & Hide)
- If the Cat Come Back, Shinkoyo, 2020
