= Lowfish =

Canadian electronic musician and producer

Gregory de Rocher
- Also known as: Lowfish; Pest(e)
- Born: 1972
- Origin: Toronto, Canada
- Genres: Electronic; lo-fi; IDM
- Occupation(s): Electronic musician Producer
- Years active: Early 1990s–present
- Labels: Suction; Satamile; Noise Factory
- Website: www.lowfishmusic.com

Lowfish is the stage name of Canadian electronic musician and producer Gregory de Rocher.

Originating from Toronto, de Rocher was a fan of Donna Summer's Eurodisco single "I Feel Love", and became fascinated with electronic music after attending a demonstration of modular synthesizers at a science museum. He began experimenting with synthesizers and drum machines in the early 1990s. De Rocher recorded his early work under the name Pest(e), before establishing Suction Records with business partner Jason Amm (who records his own music under the alias Solvent), in 1997. De Rocher then adopted his best-known moniker, a modified contraction of "lo-fi-ish". He and Amm have performed together under the banner of "Solvent vs Lowfish".

Aside from his own compositions, de Rocher has provided remixes for artists including David Kristian and Kid606. He has created cover art for various Suction Records releases.

== Style ==
Lowfish's work has been described by Muzik as "melodic electronica", and by AllMusic as "energetic lo-fi experimental electro". Billboard saw the project as a "notable act" within the electroclash genre. De Rocher said of his musical style, "I'm an industrial/[new] wave guy at heart obsessed with drum machine-accurate beats and OMD-like lead lines. But I do listen to a lot of the IDM heroes and that obviously has soaked in." He has further cited Giorgio Moroder and Gary Numan as influences. De Rocher uses vintage monophonic synths such as the Roland System 100, and early polyphonic models including the ARP Odyssey and the Roland Jupiter-6.

De Rocher noted that his visual artworks are influenced by those of England's Factory Records.

== Discography ==
Studio albums

- Test(e) (1995) (as Pest(e))
- Fear Not the Snow and Other Lo-fiing Objects (1999)
- Eliminator (2000)
- 1000 Corrections Per Second (2003)
- Burn the Lights Out (2007)
- Frozen & Broken (2008)
- Memories Are Uncertain Friends (2010)
- Grey with Breaks (2023)
