= Twine (band) =

American electronic music duo

- Origin: Cleveland, Ohio
- Genres: IDM, glitch
- Years active: 1997–present
- Members: Greg Malcolm; Chad Mossholder

Twine is an American electronic music duo that formed in Cleveland, Ohio, in 1997. In addition to releasing four albums and one EP, the duo have also created two royalty-free libraries of audio samples for the Sonic Foundry digital audio workstation, ACID.

== History ==
Greg Malcolm and Chad Mossholder went to the same high school in Cleveland, Ohio, when they began making music together. They shared a common interest in skateboarding and attended Akron University together for a year. The group formed at Kent State University in 1997 as a collaboration between Mossholder and David Graves. They were working under the name "The New Severe Theatre" before Graves moved to Maryland a few months later. Mossholder then asked his old friend Malcolm to join, and they changed the name of their pairing to Twine. Both Malcolm and Mossholder have formal educations in computers and technology.

The group's first album Reference, was released in 1999. The second, Recorder, came out in 2002, followed by an eponymous release in 2003. There followed a five year wait until their fourth album, Violets, which finally arrived in 2008. The majority of work on the album occurred from 2003–2004. Commenting on the delay, Malcolm stated, "After four years, I felt personally hopeless about the release and lost faith basically in the entire indie-electronic music business." Mossholder, on the other hand, said that both the band and label Ghostly International wanted to "release something special for the listener". Both men were also busy with their personal careers in the interim, though they continued writing and recording new material, and have a large collection of unpublished music. Mossholder has done extensive work writing music and doing sound design for video games, while Malcolm works in the commercial photography industry. In 2011, Malcolm said that the duo would attempt to "re-launch" Twine that year.

== Musical style ==
Mark Richardson of Allmusic said that the duo "combine samples, digitally generated tones, and processed instruments into an electronic mix that defies easy categorization." Malcolm also said of their sound: "I can't define it, but I know what it is when I see (hear) it." Mossholder said of their collaborative style, "We create a common virtual space where we can deposit ideas, sounds, song fragments, and sometimes complete thoughts." Malcolm commented that the pair were "like Voltron: able to operate independently," but able to "come together when needed, and make the sum greater than the parts."

== Reception ==
The pair's second album, Recorder, was positively received, called both "dark and deep" and "an achievement". Their fifth, Violets, was described as "powerful" and "really worthwhile".

== Discography ==
=== Studio albums ===
- Reference (1999) – Ad Astra
- Recorder (2002) – Bip-Hop
- Twine (2003) – Ghostly International
- Surfaces (2006) – Ghostly Digital
- Violets (2008) – Ghostly International

=== Loop libraries ===
- Intelligent Dance Music (2000)
- Build (2001)
- Either/Or Electronica (2008) (only Malcolm)
