= Yamaha SY85 =

Digital music workstation

SY85
- Manufacturer: Yamaha
- Dates: 1992

Technical specifications
- Polyphony: 30-voice
- Timbrality: 16-part
- Oscillator: PCM (Yamaha AWM2)
- Synthesis type: Sample-based
- Filter: LPF, HPF, BPF, BEF
- Aftertouch expression: Yes
- Velocity expression: Yes
- Storage memory: 6MB wave ROM; 0.5MB Volatile wave RAM (expandable to 8.5MB using 2x4mb 30 pin simms); 1mb (2x512kb) Non volatile ram with proprietary memory cards; 2 × external card (waveform + Data); 3.5" 720kb DSDD floppy disc
- Effects: 2 × 90 types

Input/output
- Keyboard: 61 key
- Left-hand control: Modulation wheel, pitch wheel
- External control: MIDI (In, Out, Thru)

The Yamaha SY85 is a digital music workstation introduced in 1992. Unlike other Yamaha synthesizers of the time (SY77 and the SY99) the SY85 does not use FM synthesis. Instead, its sounds are based on samples, which can be layered and modified to create new sounds.

== User interface ==
The workstation features a 61-note velocity-sensitive keyboard with aftertouch, a double density 3.5" floppy drive, a two line, 40 character LCD, and a nine-track MIDI sequencer. It is a multitimbral synthesizer with 30-note polyphony and full MIDI capabilities. In addition to pitch and modulation wheels, the SY85 features eight continuous sliders that can be used to adjust various settings in real time. These sliders also function as faders when using the built-in sequencer. The SY85 features two independent effects units, which can be run in series or in parallel, each in turn providing either a single effect or two effects in parallel or cascade mode.

== Internal memory ==
The SY85's internal voice memory holds 256 voices in four 64 slot banks. These can be played individually or layered, up to four at a time. The keyboard can be split to allow different voices or combinations of voices to be played only in particular regions. Up to 128 of these layered combinations can be stored in internal memory as 'performances' in two banks with also 64 slots each. The SY85 also features velocity switching, the ability to switch between two samples based on the speed with which a key is depressed. Voices can also be treated with a variety of filters, including a high-pass filter, low-pass filter, band-pass filter, and a band-elimination/band-stop filter.

== Sequencer ==
The sequencer features eight standard tracks and a dedicated rhythm track. The tracks can be recorded in real or step time and quantized to 1/4, 1/6, 1/8, 1/12, 1/16, 1/24, and 1/32 values. The rhythm track is composed by combining any of 100 rhythm patterns, each of which can be edited independently. These patterns, however, are shared between songs. So changing a pattern will, for good or bad, change it in any song that uses it. The sequencer can store up to ten songs (20,000 notes, total) at a time.

== External memory ==
Voice and sequencer data and samples can be loaded from or saved to 3.5" double-density floppy discs. Voices and performance combinations can also be loaded from or saved to Yamaha's proprietary MCD64 (64K RAM cards (one slot for such cards was provided, alongside one slot for a PCM 'waveform' ROM card). Yamaha and other manufacturers sold expansion sounds for the SY85 in both formats. The SY85 can also transmit and receive voice and sequencer data as MIDI sysex bulk dumps and load or send samples via the MIDI sample dump standard (SDS).

== Optional expansion ==
As standard, 0.5MB of volatile user waveform RAM is provided, whose contents are lost when the device is switched off. It is expandable with one or two 512KB non-volatile, proprietary SYEMB06 RAM modules and up to 2MB of extra volatile RAM through standard SIMM modules. Users have reported using up to 8MB of volatile RAM successfully.

== Rack-mount version: TG500 ==
Yamaha also offered a rack-mount version of the SY85 called the TG500. It lacks the keyboard, sequencer, floppy drive and continuous sliders but adds additional outputs, a further card slot of each kind (for four slots in total) and 2MB of waveform ROM for 50 additional internal waveforms for a total of 8MB over the 6MB of the SY85. It has four banks of preset (i.e. non-modifiable) voices (i.e. 252 preset voices and four drum voices in total) and two banks of preset performances (128 total) and only two banks of internal, user-modifiable voices (126/2) and one bank of internal performances (64). The TG500 lacks the waveform RAM of the SY85, but can be expanded with one or two SYEMB06 non-volatile waveform RAM modules. It also features 64 note polyphony, being one of the first commercial synthesisers to do so.

== Notable users ==
The SY85 has been used by Gary Barlow. The TG500 was used by George Michael.
