= Intergalactic FM =

- The Hague; Netherlands

Programming
- Languages: mainly English, some Dutch

Ownership
- Owner: Stichting Hotmix

History
- First air date: August 22, 2008

Links
- Webcast: Intergalactic FM Main; Intergalactic FM Classix; Intergalactic FM Dream Machine
- Website: intergalactic.fm

Intergalactic FM (IFM) is an online multichannel cult radio station playing 24/7.

== List of channels ==
The following channels are on Intergalactic FM:

- Cybernetic Broadcasting System
- Disco Fetish: Italo, Disco and Oldschool
- The Dream Machine: Soundtracks and exotica

IFM3 was temporarily discontinued on November 20, 2015, and Murder Capital FM was promoted to Intergalactic FM Main for IFM1. In September 2016 IFM3/ABC was reinstated.

In September 2017, The Garden (space and ambient music) was discontinued.

IFM also has a live video plds audio stream for broadcasting DJ sets.

== Festivals ==
The yearly festivals for Intergalactic FM were held in The Hague on:

- 2025, from 29 May to 1st June
- 2023, 18-21 May
- 2022, 26-29 May
- 2021, streaming edition
- 2020, 21–25 May, streaming edition
- 2019, 6–9 June
- 2018, 17–20 May, 10 year anniversary
- 2017, 13–16 April, featuring Magic Waves

== See also ==
- I-f
