= Solvent (producer) =

Zimbabwean electronic producer and remixer

Jason Amm
- Also known as: Solvent
- Born: 1972 (age 53–54)
- Origin: Zimbabwe
- Genres: IDM; Electropop
- Occupations: Electronic musician Producer
- Years active: 1997–present
- Labels: Morr Music; Suction Records; Ghostly International
- Website: www.solventcity.com

Solvent is the stage name used by electronic producer and remixer Jason Amm. Although his music has been included in the electroclash movement (as his track "My Radio" appeared on Ghostly International's 2002 compilation album Disco Nouveau), many of Solvent's tracks fall under the intelligent dance music or electropop genres. Jason Amm's music is associated with influences from early 1980s artists – PopMatters noted his "Yaz[oo] and OMD roots" – but his influences are much wider, spanning the last several decades.

With partner Gregory DeRocher (who records his own music using the pseudonym Lowfish), Amm owned and operated the Suction record label until its demise in 2008. This was partly because 12" records were no longer being manufactured in Canada, leading to costly imports from the USA.

Aside from tracks appearing on various-artists compilations, Amm has released several full-length albums using the Solvent moniker.

== Discography ==
=== Albums ===
- 1998 Solvent
- 1999 Solvently One Listens
- 2001 Solvent City
- 2004 Apples + Synthesizers
- 2005 Elevators + Oscillators
- 2007 Demonstration Tape (1997-2007)
- 2010 Subject to Shift
- 2014 New Ways (Music From The Documentary I Dream of Wires)
