= In Decay =

Compilation album by Com Truise
- Released: July 16, 2012
- Genre: Electropop, synthwave
- Length: 56:22
- Label: Ghostly International
- Producer: Com Truise

Com Truise chronology
Galactic Melt (2011)	In Decay (2012)	Wave 1 (2014)

In Decay is a compilation album by the American musician Seth Haley, known professionally as Com Truise. It was released on July 16, 2012, through the independent record label Ghostly International. It is a collection of tracks that, prior to the release, were only available as tracks found on Haley's internet mixtape series, Komputer Kasts, and his SoundCloud account. These early tracks, some of which were produced before the release of his debut EP, Cyanide Sisters (2010), showcase Haley exploring an electropop funk music sound that would later come to define Com Truise. Critical reception upon release was mixed; a common praise was the album's sound design, while frequent criticisms were its repetition, and lack of distinct tone and feel of each track. A follow-up compilation album, In Decay, Too, was released in 2020.

== Background and release ==
For Haley's second studio album as Com Truise, he initially planned to "kind of experiment more, because I was feeling a little trapped for a while there, after doing a bunch of touring and stuff." However, following demands from his label Ghostly International and emails sent by listeners to issue a collection of his tracks that were previously only on internet-distributed mixtapes, such as those from his Komputer Kasts series, and his SoundCloud account, Haley ultimately decided to make his next release a collection of these tracks. After "Open" was released as the lead single from In Decay on June 26, 2012, Stereogum premiered the compilation on July 16, 2012.

[The tracks] were on my hard drive – pieces of art that were just decaying with time. So I thought 'let's just get them out there.' There wasn't a grand idea. My lawyer, who's also my manager, helped with tracklisting, along with the label [Ghostly]. But it was really my way of shutting the door on stuff and moving forward.

— Seth Haley, 2022

== Content ==
In Decay is a collection of Com Truise's early recordings, some from Truise's online mixtapes and some unreleased; they were mastered for the album by Haley. The earliest-made tracks were composed before the release of the project's debut EP Cyanide Sisters (2010), which Haley described as less "experimental" and more "structured" than his later material. As Haley explained, "some of those tracks are maybe a continuation [of the themes and sounds on Galactic Melt], and there are parts of them which follow the same path. But there are others which are pretty old, at least to me. It feels different." In Decay maintains the same electropop funk music structure that consists of 1980s synthesizers, tough bass sounds, and science fiction elements as Com Truise's previous releases. Some reviewers have described the songs on the album as lo-fi, "somewhat grittier," and "slightly rougher-around-the-edges" versions of the sound of the project's past records. Ghostly's press release explained that the compilation features Haley exploring parts of this sound, such as "8-bit influenced experimentalism" and "distinctly danceable beats." Some tracks on In Decay are slow-tempo, calm-vibe dance songs, while others are extraterrestrial psychedelic cuts similar to the works of Tangerine Dream and Popol Vuh.

Patric Fallon of XLR8R highlighted In Decay's experimentation absent from the normal output of the Com Truise project; examples include the minimal music structure of "Yxes" and the use of live bass guitar on the songs "Alfa Beach" and "Dreambender." Pitchfork journalist Andrew Gaerig analyzed that while previous releases of Com Truise focused on Haley being able to skillfully wind synthesizer sounds "into pleasing shapes that his compositions can sound complex when they're not," In Decay is where drum sounds such as "grid-worshipping snares" manage to "give him" with the target away and go against "the more formed melodic ideas."

== Reception ==
Professional ratings
Review scores
Source	Rating
AllMusic	3.5/5 stars
Consequence of Sound	D
Pitchfork	5.6/10
Tiny Mix Tapes	3.5/5 discs
XLR8R	7/10

In Decay was met with mixed reviews from music critics. Jonah Ollman of CMJ described the music as "lush," commended the synth soundscapes, and concluded that the album is "just as satisfying and cohesive as a proper sophomore album." Fallon highlighted the unreleased tracks to have a certain "depth" not present in Com Truise's past releases.

Ben Sullivan, reviewing for Tiny Mix Tapes, called it rare for a compilation album of tracks that were previously unreleased but still made before an act's first studio album to be better than said first album: "While it may obvious that Haley should now start to explore sounds and motifs exogenous to his coterie of synths, In Decay has an immediacy and satisfying mix that would only benefit an exploration of its hints of Negativland, mid-career DJ Shadow, and mid-2000s IDM." He wrote that the best tracks of In Decay, the cuts "that really go places," are better than the greatest tracks on Galactic Melt. He was critical of the track lengths and the lack of "attention to sequencing," which led to problems like "rhythmic redundancies" on songs such as "Dreambender", "Klymaxx", and "Yxes". He wrote that "half of these tracks could end two minutes short of their run times."

A common criticism pointed out in mixed reviews of In Decay was its focus on repetition and the lack of "differentiation" in terms of tone and feel. Adam Kivel of Consequence of Sound wrote that, while he felt there was enough material for Com Truise fans to enjoy before the next release of the project, issuing a rarities compilation so early in Truise's career is a "strange choice, as it sets the bar low." He criticized most of the tracks for how they build based on their repetition, writing that "the shapeshifting doesn't always provide that large of a difference in tone from the original iteration." Kivel also disliked the hazy sound of the material, opining that it "can tend to overrun everything else, softening the edges of feelings that could otherwise be crushingly powerful."

An Exclaim! critic wrote, "[Haley's] sonic ideas are circular lines constantly spiralling into themselves ― simple, looped melodies, a flourish here, a hazy sample there, lather, rinse, repeat ― but there's very little difference in tone to keep your attention." Gaerig, who called the album's songs "deceptively underdeveloped," "too dull and passive to threaten," said it "baubles, pure sonic fetishes that that fail to provoke discernible imagery or mood beyond a noirish appreciation for the oscillators of Christmas past." He wrote that "nothing here dispels the notion that [Haley's] vision is more limited" than other acts influenced by 1980s synthpop.

=== Legacy ===
Over the years, In Decay has received online praise, with YouTube possibly being the main reason for the album's success. In 2022, Sam Willings wrote to MusicTech that In Decay "has genuinely become a synthwave classic that's been enjoyed tens of millions of times and has influenced a plethora of artists", arguably becoming Com Truise's most celebrated project. In response to this, Haley stated: "I don't know, it just makes me grin. I don't feel worthy of it because it was all just me monkeying around in my bedroom. I didn't really know what I was doing."

== Track listing ==
All songs written and produced by Seth Haley.

No.	Title	Length
1.	"Open"	4:12
2.	"84' Dreamin"	3:30
3.	"Dreambender"	4:20
4.	"Controlpop"	5:04
5.	"Colorvision"	4:04
6.	"Alfa Beach"	4:16
7.	"Stop"	5:07
8.	"Klymaxx"	4:24
9.	"Yxes"	3:52
10.	"Smily Cyclops"	4:44
11.	"Video Arkade"	5:27
12.	"Data Kiss"	4:08
13.	"Closed"	3:04
Total length:		56:22
