= Kiln (band) =

American ambient music group

- Origin: East Lansing, Michigan, United States
- Genres: Ambient; Post-rock; Shoegaze
- Years active: 1994-present
- Labels: Ghostly International; Roomtone; Thalassa; Division Sound; Infraction; Earthtone; Mind Expansion; Alley Sweeper
- Members: Kevin Hayes; Kirk Marrison; Clark Rehberg III
- Website: http://www.kilnaudio.com/

Kiln (often typeset as KILN) is a Michigan-based Ambient studio trio that is a reincarnation of ambient group Fibreforms.

== Discography ==
- Treedrums as Fibreforms (Earthtone, 1996)
- Earthtone Colectiv 7" as Fibreforms w/ Owleye and Waterwheel (Earthtone/Mind Expansion, 1996)
- Panchroma as Waterwheel (Alley Sweeper, 1997)
- Stone EP as Fibreforms (Roomtone, 1997)
- Kiln EP (Roomtone, 1997)
- Holo (Thalassa, 1998)
- Ampday (Thalassa, 2000)
- Thermals (Self-released, 2001; Infraction re-release, 2005)
- Sunbox (Ghostly International, 2004)
- Twinewheel - Lost-Sides and Dusty-Gems 1994-2005 (Division Sound, 2005)
- Holo [Re/Lux] (Re-release, independent, 2007)
- Vaporbend EP (Ghostly International, 2007)
- Dusker (Ghostly International, 2007)
- meadow:watt (Ghostly International, 2013)
- Astral Welder (Ghostly International, 2020)

== Line-up ==
- Kevin Hayes - drums, sampling
- Kirk Marrison - treated guitar, acoustic guitar, effect loops, keyboard
- Clark Rehberg III - treated guitar, effect loops
- Brady Kish - bass guitar, double bass (session musician)

== In Media ==
Kiln was mentioned in a Radiolab music special on May 14, 2008.

In 2013 the group contributed three songs to the PlayStation game Hohokum.
