= Com Truise =

American electronic musician and DJ (born 1985)

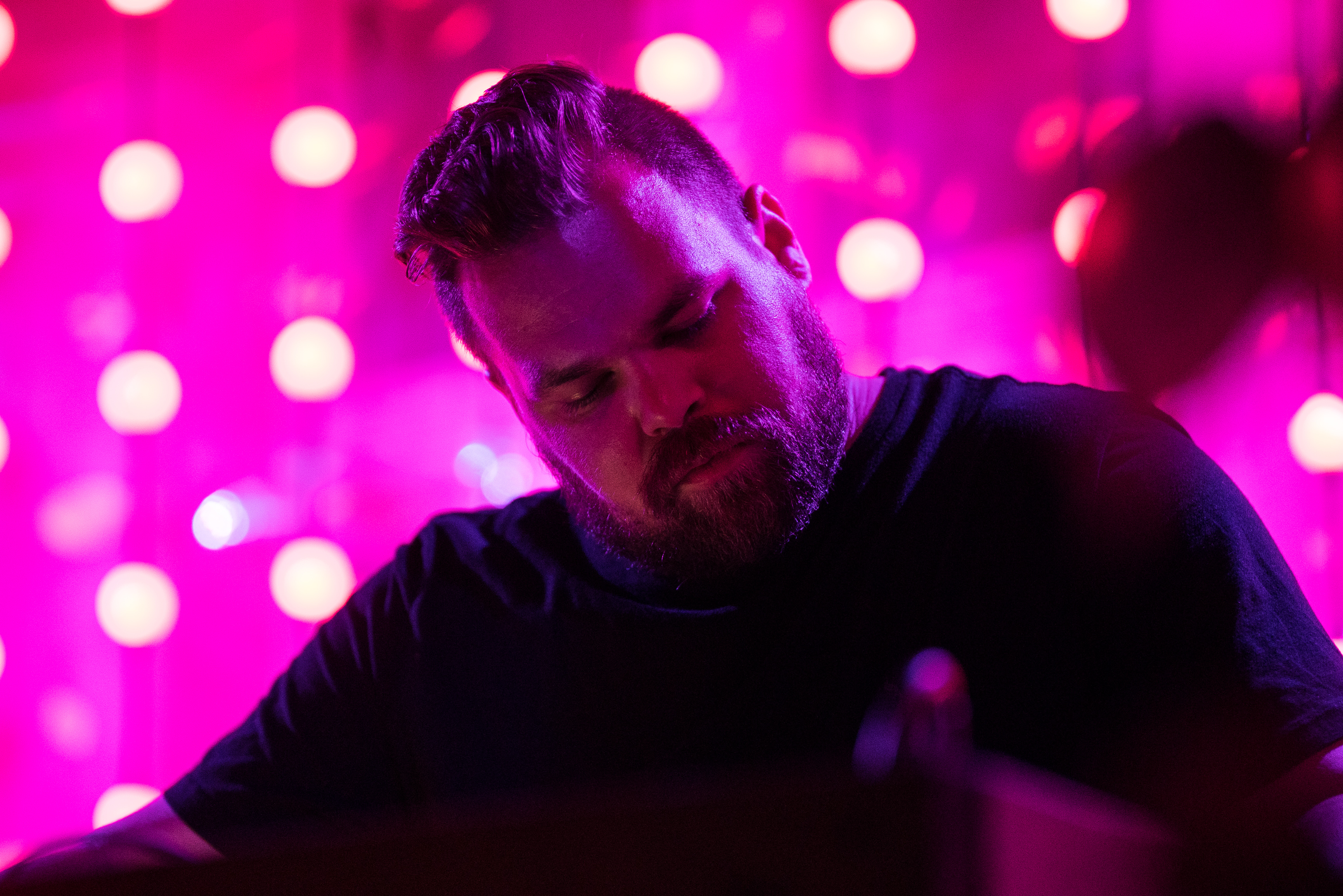
- Com Truise performing in 2018

Background information
- Born: Seth Haley; 1985 (age 40–41)
- Origin: Madison County, New York, U.S.
- Genres: Synthwave; chillwave
- Occupations: Musician; DJ
- Years active: 2007–present
- Labels: AMDISCS; Ghostly International
- Website: comtruise.com

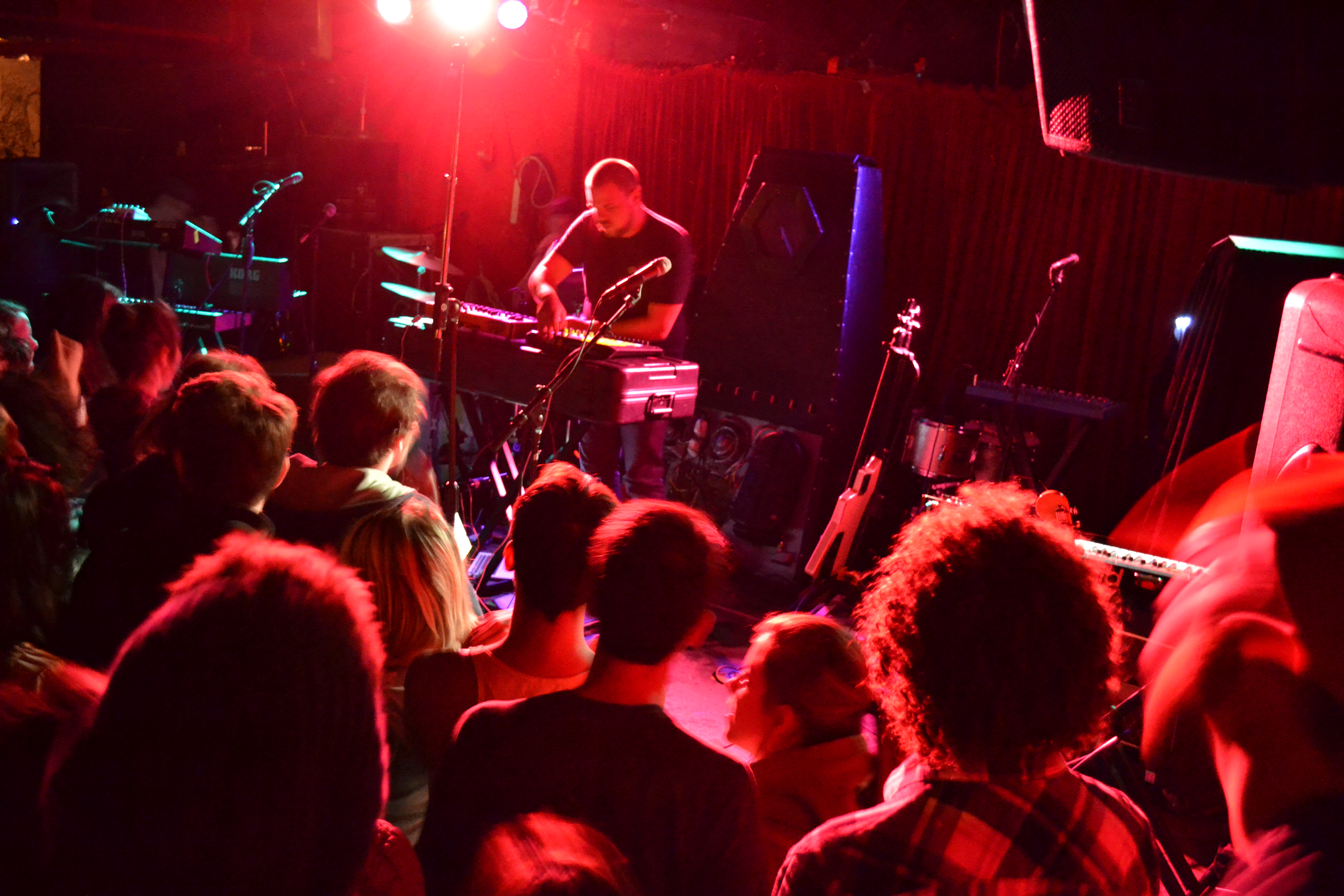
Com Truise in 2011 at the Grog Shop in Cleveland Heights, Ohio

Seth Haley, known by his stage name Com Truise, is an American electronic musician and DJ. His stage name is a spoonerism of the name of American actor Tom Cruise.

== Biography ==
Prior to 2010, Haley had released music under the pseudonyms Sarin Sunday, SYSTM, and Airliner.

In 2010, the first Com Truise recording, the Cyanide Sisters EP, was released. Initially, it was a free download from the AMDISCS record label. Ghostly International digitally reissued the EP in January 2011. Haley resigned from his job as art director prior to this release. Com Truise remixed Daft Punk's song "ENCOM, Part II" for the Tron: Legacy Reconfigured album soon after. In June 2011, he released his debut album, Galactic Melt. In Decay was the immediate full-length followup in 2012. Com Truise's songs are represented by Downtown Music Publishing.

Haley is from Oneida, New York, and now resides in Orlando, Florida.

In February 2022, Com Truise produced the music for Coinbase's viral Super Bowl LVI advertisement. He sampled the Beatles' cover of "Money (That's What I Want)". In April 2022, he released a course on producing music with online music school Soundfly.

== Style ==
Truise's sound is synthesizer-heavy synthwave, inspired by 1980s musical styles, as first offered on the Cyanide Sisters EP; he calls his style "mid-fi synthwave slow-motion funk". AllMusic lists Giorgio Moroder, Orchestral Manoeuvres in the Dark and Boards of Canada as influences.

=== The "Com Truise" saga ===
All of the Com Truise albums, starting with Cyanide Sisters and ending with Iteration, tell the story of a space traveller named Com Truise; Haley described the character as a "synthetic astronaut", and the story as a tale about escaping an oppressed society.

== Equipment ==
Truise uses a mix of digital and analogue hardware, including emulations of classic synthesisers and romplers. According to a 2015 MusicRadar interview, his DAWs of choice are Reason and Ableton.

Since 2017, he has incorporated the Dave Smith Instruments OB-6 on some tracks, also using it during live performances.

== Discography ==
=== As Com Truise ===
- Galactic Melt (2011)
- Fairlight (2011)
- In Decay (2012)
- Iteration (2017)
- Persuasion System (2019)
- In Decay, Too (2020)

=== SYSTM ===
Title	EP details
Invader	Released: 2009; Label: N/A (self-released)

=== Airliner ===
Title	LP details
None	Released: November 2010; Label: N/A (self-released)

== Filmography ==
=== Composer ===
- Private Property (2022)
