= Galactic Melt =

Studio album by Com Truise
- Released: June 5, 2011
- Genre: Synthwave
- Length: 43:07
- Label: Ghostly
- Producer: Com Truise

Com Truise chronology
Fairlight (2011)	Galactic Melt (2011)	In Decay (2012)

Singles from Galactic Melt
- 1. "Futureworld" Released: July 19, 2010; 2. "Cathode Girls" Released: March 18, 2011

Galactic Melt is the debut studio album by American electronic musician Com Truise, released on June 5, 2011 by the independent record label Ghostly International.

== Critical reception ==
Professional ratings
Aggregate scores
Source	Rating
Metacritic	71/100
Review scores
Source	Rating
AllMusic	3.5/5 stars
The Boston Phoenix	1.5/4 stars
Consequence of Sound	D
Mojo	4/5 stars
Pitchfork	7.3/10
Resident Advisor	3/5
Spin	7/10
Slant Magazine	3.5/5 stars
Tiny Mix Tapes	2.5/5 stars
Urb	4.5/5 stars

Galactic Melt received generally positive reviews from critics, with a score of 71 out of 100 based on 16 reviews on review aggregator website Metacritic. AllMusic journalist Andy Kellman compared it to the works of Ford & Lopatin in that it "can be enjoyed in one-track doses or complete immersion, and it often inspires YouTube users to upload unofficial videos incorporating fuzzy, dreamlike images from early- to mid-‘80s television and film clips."

== Track listing ==
Galactic Melt track listing
No.	Title	Length
1.	"Terminal"	1:47
2.	"VHS Sex"	4:25
3.	"Cathode Girls"	4:37
4.	"Air Cal"	4:33
5.	"Flightwave"	5:05
6.	"Hyperlips"	4:54
7.	"Brokendate"	5:08
8.	"Glawio"	5:07
9.	"Ether Drift"	4:21
10.	"Futureworld"	3:10

iTunes bonus track
No.	Title	Length
11.	"Karova"	5:13

Galactic Melt (Redux) - Vinyl edition
No.	Title	Length
11.	"Karova"	5:13
12.	"Galactic Melt"

Galactic Melt (10th Anniversary Edition) track listing
No.	Title	Length
11.	"Karova"	5:12
12.	"Intraplexdin"	5:06
13.	"Cntrled"	5:06
14.	"Pantex"	4:29
15.	"Arwarw"	3:27
