= Ghostly International =

American independent record label

- Founded: 1999
- Founder: Samuel Valenti IV
- Distributors: Secretly Distribution, BWSCD, Inc.
- Genre: Various
- Country of origin: United States
- Location: Brooklyn, New York
- Official website: ghostly.com

Ghostly International is an American independent record label founded in 1999 by Samuel Valenti IV and currently headquartered in Brooklyn, New York City.

== History ==
Ghostly International was founded in Ann Arbor, Michigan by Sam Valenti IV in 1999. He grew up in suburban Detroit, where, having become a fan of underground music culture, he would sneak into hip-hop clubs by carrying records for his Detroit DJ hero Houseshoes. Valenti later became a DJ himself, taking the name DJ SpaceGhost; this theme is echoed by the name and logo of Ghostly International.

Valenti met Matthew Dear at a house party that Valenti attended during his first week at the University of Michigan in Ann Arbor. Their shared affection for electronic music, particularly the sound of Detroit techno, led to the label's (and Dear’s) first 12 inch single, "Hands Up For Detroit." Following this, Ghostly enjoyed early success with albums by Mullinix as well as Disco Nouveau, a compilation including artists such as ADULT., Solvent, Legowelt, Daniel Wang and DMX Krew, inspired by the Italo disco movement of the 1970s and 1980s.

The label then widened its focus to include groups such as Skeletons & The Girl-Faced Boys and Mobius Band, whose rock-based sound aligns with the label's focus. Also known for package design by Will Calcutt and Deanne Cheuk, as well as the Boy, Cat, and Bird logos of Michael Segal, Ghostly International focuses on visual design alongside music.

Ghostly International followed up Disco Nouveau with two more successful compilation albums featuring its artists: Idol Tryouts and Idol Tryouts 2.

Ghostly International also runs a companion label, Spectral Sound, formed in 2000, releasing dance records by Matthew Dear/Audion, Seth Troxler, Avalon Emerson, and other producers.

Ghostly International and Adult Swim released a compilation album known as Ghostly Swim, available on Adult Swim's website for free. It was released with a bonus track on January 27, 2009 as a limited edition CD. Two sequels to Ghostly Swim, Ghostly Swim 2, was released digitally on December 23, 2014, (CD on April 28, 2015) and Ghostly Swim 3 on December 13, 2019.

The label has also been involved in the soundtracks for video games. In 2014, Ghostly released a compilation album of new and previously recorded work by Ghostly artists to act as the soundtrack to the video game Hohokum. A year later, the first soundtrack to critically acclaimed videogame Minecraft by German musician C418 was released by Ghostly as a vinyl LP on August 21, 2015, four years after its original digital release by C418. In 2018 a limited-edition version of the Super Nt home video game console was made by Analogue and Ghostly International.

Throughout the 2010s, Ghostly International released music from artists such as Com Truise, Heathered Pearls, HTRK, Shigeto, Tycho, and TOBACCO. The label also collaborated with various brands, including Adult Swim and Warby Parker. In 2015, Ghostly International moved to Brooklyn, New York, where they are still based to this day.

In 2019, Ghostly marked its 20th anniversary with collaborative projects, including partnerships with Vans and Miffy, as well as events in multiple cities. The label received its second Grammy nomination for a retrospective box set the same year.

In 2020, after more than a decade of working with Secretly Distribution, Ghostly International became an affiliate label of Secretly Group, partnering with Ben Swanson, Chris Swanson, Darius Van Arman and Phil Waldorf, and co-founding All Flowers Group, a label group which also includes the label drink sum wtr.

== List of artists ==
- Adult.
- Aeroc
- Beacon
- Brijean
- Bullion
- Choir of Young Believers
- Christopher Willits
- Ciel
- Com Truise
- C418
- crushed
- Dabrye
- Dauwd
- Deastro
- dreamcastmoe
- Dua Saleh
- Emeralds
- Fort Romeau
- Geotic
- Gold Panda
- Ginger Root
- Goya Gumbani
- Galcher Lustwerk
- Heathered Pearls
- HTRK
- Hana Vu
- Helios
- Jacaszek
- Julie Byrne
- Kate Simko
- Khotin
- Kiln
- Kate Bollinger
- Lord RAJA
- Lusine
- Loraine James (as Whatever The Weather)
- Mary Lattimore
- Matrixxman
- Matthew Dear
- Michna
- Moderna
- Mux Mool
- Nautiluss
- Pale Sketcher
- Phantogram
- Psymun
- quickly, quickly
- Recondite
- Sam Valenti IV
- Shigeto
- The Sight Below
- Solvent
- STUDIO
- Tadd Mullinix
- Tobacco
- Tropic of Cancer
- Ultraísta
- Willits + Sakamoto (Christopher Willits & Ryuichi Sakamoto)
- Xeno & Oaklander

=== Formerly signed ===
- 10:32
- Ben Benjamin
- Black Marble
- Cepia
- The Chap
- Charles Manier
- Clark Warner
- Daniel Wang
- Dykehouse
- Grand Valley State New Music Ensemble
- JDSY
- Jeffery Sfire
- Kill Memory Crash
- Loscil
- Midwest Product
- PostPrior
- Mike Servito
- Mobius Band
- North Valley Subconscious Orchestra
- School of Seven Bells
- Skeletons & The Kings of All Cities
- Syntaks
- Twine
- Tycho

== Awards and nominations ==
Award ceremony	Year	Nominee/Work	Category	Result
Libera Award for Label of the Year	2015	Ghostly International	Label of the Year (Small)	Won
59th Annual Grammy Awards	2017	Epoch (Tycho album)	Best Dance/Electronic Album	Nominated
63rd Annual Grammy Awards	2021	The Story of Ghostly International	Best Boxed or Special Limited Edition Package	Nominated
