= Papercutz =

Portuguese electronic music act

PAPERCUTZ
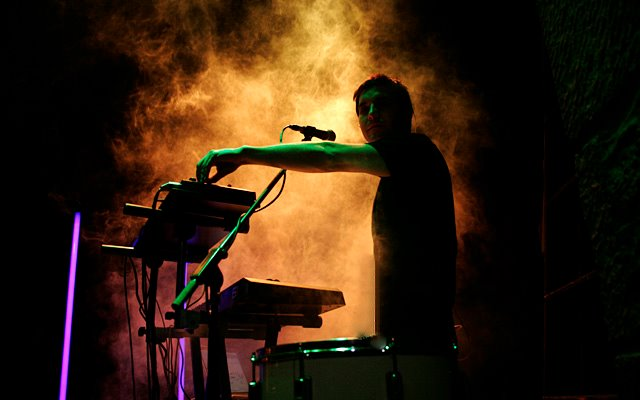

Background information
- Origin: Porto, Portugal
- Genres: Pop, electronic
- Years active: 2008–present
- Labels: Enchufada; Audiobulb Records; Apegenine recordings Kilk Records
- Members: Bruno Miguel
- Past members: Melissa Veras; Marisa Pinto; Marcela Freitas; Bruno Ribeiro; Nuno Sarafa
- Website: PAPERCUTZ.pt

:PAPERCUTZ (stylized as :papercutz or :PAPERCUTZ) is a Portuguese electronic music act formed as a side project in Porto, from Portugal, that became a fully active band in 2008. Bruno Miguel is the only official member of :papercutz and solely responsible for its musical direction. After recordings, Bruno assembles a live band to perform with him which may include musicians used on studio recordings. Past musicians have included vocalists Melissa Veras, an American singer with Portuguese ascendancy born in New York and Portuguese Marisa Pinto, Marcela Freitas as well as instrumentalists Bruno Ribeiro, Nuno Sarafa and Francisco Bernardo, among others.

Annie Nightingale described them as 'interesting and making an original sound' as one of the juries on the UK The People's Music Awards in 2009 where the group performed live and won the off the beaten track category. The same year the debut album Lylac was released on Canadian independent record label Apegenine recordings whose artist roster featured artists such as Montreal's own David Kristian or Khonnor and the single Ultravioleta rmx's included remixes by Riz Maslen (aka Neotropic) and the first ever release by now known The Sight Below just before his signing to Ghostly International.

The album was well received by the press and music community and featured in such publications as Textura, Cuemix-magazine, Tokafi, Cylic Defrost, Subba-cultcha Organ Mag with Record Collector comparing Bruno's precision work to that of Four Tet. The group toured in 2009 and 2010 promoting their debut album throughout Europe and U.S. with showcases on festivals such as SXSW and Exit Festival and signed to UK Audiobulb Records a new remix album Do outro lado do espelho (Lylac ambient reworks) spawned out of Lylac's textures with Drowned in Sound calling the album 'notably coherent and engaging' unlike other remix records featuring relevant ambient music artists like Taylor Deupree, Keith Kenniff, ex-member of UK 'shoegaze' icons Slowdive and Lowgold drummer Simon Scott among many others that Bruno personally invited to work on his music.

By end of 2011 news, came out that the band was working on a new still untitled album. Their new songs made an early debut at the 2012 edition of South by Southwest where it was noted the band had been working with producer Chris Coady in New York City. and were showcasing their new single "Rivers" which presented the band in a beat-heavy, darkened version of their left field dream pop. The album The Blur Between Us was released on 10 July 2012 and sees the band growing music wise with a push toward more eclectic sounds and personally with Miguel writing and dealing lyrically with feelings of loss for the first time in his adult years. After praises from media such as The Fader defining the album "Beautiful and unsettling music." and XLR8R as "exciting dream pop with layers of pulsating synths" The Blur Between Us mastered by Grammy winner Joe LaPorta was re-released as a special edition in Japan through Tokyo’s Kilk records with major support from Tower Records Japan featuring remixes from electronic music producers such as Sara Abdel-Hamid aka Ikonika or Kyson.

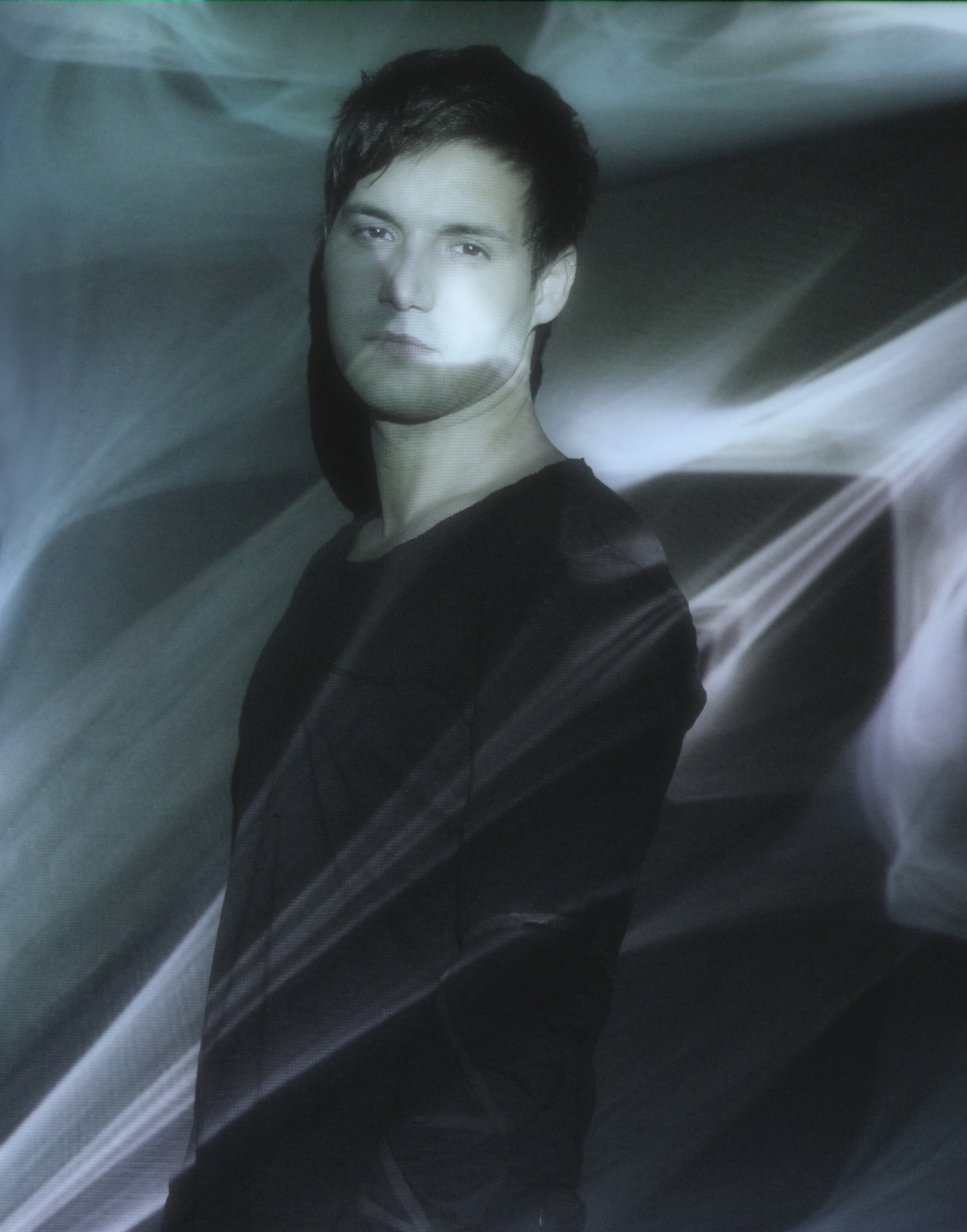
Producer/Composer Bruno Miguel from Porto

Early 2013, Miguel was selected as a participant Red Bull Music Academy with colleagues Evian Christ, Objekt, Koreless, Suzanne Kraft, Throwing Snow (from Snow Ghosts), Sinjin Hawke, Octa Octa, among others, which brought him back to New York City where the band played new shows and took a couple of months of to record new material for an upcoming EP with big expectation from the likes of MTV Iggy.

By that time Miguel is a requested producer with guest remixes for Morgan Kibby of M83, JMSN, Lucretia Dalt, Nite Jewel's Heart Shaped project, Castratii with vocalist Liela Moss of The Duke Spirit, among others.

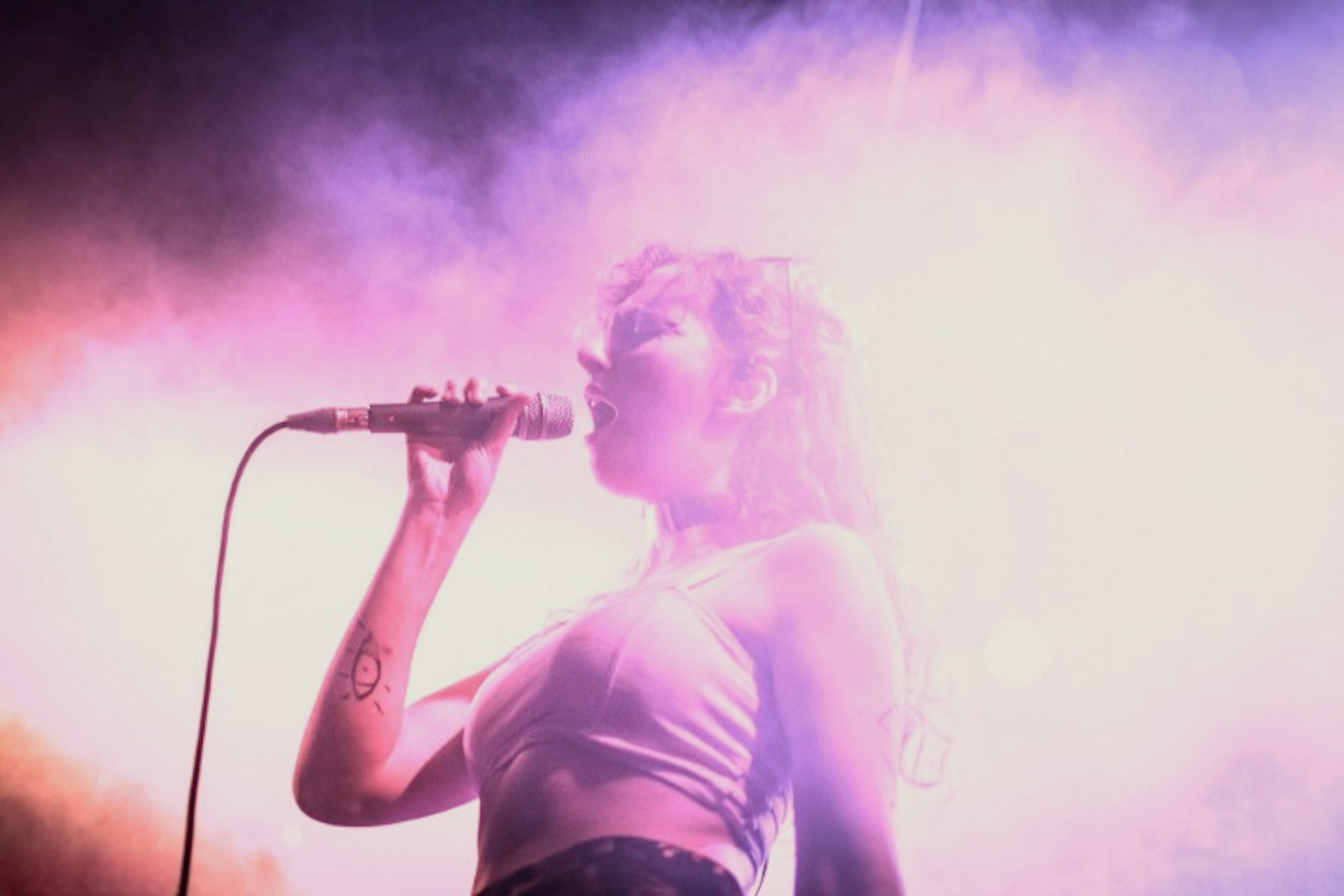
Portuguese singer Catarina Miranda :papercutz European Tour

The band had an hiatus so Bruno could pursue other musical endeavours such as movie scoring and news of a comeback appeared by fall of 2016. Coming back to shows, special dates were announced such as Further Future festival on the Moapa band of Paiute Indians and in October 2016 they were confirmed to play at the 31st edition of Eurosonic Noorderslag in Groningen, Netherlands. In 2017 the band released a new well received EP Trust/Surrender and started touring playing shows and festivals through 2018 to 2019 with dates in the U.S. Europe, Iceland and Japan in early 2020 debuting the release of their new full-length album King Ruiner in March 2020 which was produced in NYC with recordings from guest singers Catarina Miranda, Ferri and Lia Bilinsk in Portugal, Germany and Japan.

Due to the COVID-19 pandemic the band focused on playing in their home country and returned to shows throughout US, Europe and Asia in 2022 announcing a new album recorded in Portugal and Iceland.

Throughout 2023-2024, the band performed at historical venues across the country, alongside multiple engagements with overseas orchestras, which led to increased international recognition and new creative collaborations. This period marked a significant turning point in their career, as they expanded their artistic reach beyond their usual electronic pop register, successfully bridging contemporary music with orchestral traditions. By reinterpreting their catalog for symphonic arrangements, the band reached new audiences and garnered critical acclaim for their innovative approach to genre fusion.

The experience not only strengthened their presence in the global music scene but also opened doors to future projects with renowned conductors and cultural institutions, opportunities that eventually led to new performances across Europe and Asia, including appearances at major festivals and concert halls in France, South Korea, and Japan. Among the highlights was a special performance at Expo Osaka, featuring a collaboration that includes both Portuguese and Japanese musicians, celebrating a unique fusion of musical traditions from both cultures.

== Selected discography ==
- Ultravioleta rmx's (2008) Apegenine recordings
- Lylac (2008) Apegenine recordings
- Lylac (Extended Version) (2008) Apegenine recordings
- Do outro lado do espelho (Lylac ambient reworks) (2010) Audiobulb Records
- The Blur Between Us (2012) Peermusic / Rastilho Records
- The Blur Between Us (Extended Japanese Edition) (2013) Kilk Records
- Trust/Surrender (2016) Peermusic
- King Ruiner (2020) Peermusic
- King Ruiner (Extended Japanese Edition) (2020) MOORWORKS Avex Trax
- King Ruiner (Deluxe) (2021) Rastilho Records

== Videos ==
- Rivers MTV Iggy (2013)
- Where Beasts Die IMVDb (2013)
- Lylac (Helios remix) MTV (2010)

== Awards ==
Year	Nominee / work	Award	Result
2009	:papercutz	TPMA "Off the beaten track" category	Won
2009	:papercutz	Vodafone - Ones to Watch	Won
2010	"A secret search"	International Songwriting Competition (Dance/Electronica)	Won
