= New Dawn Fades =

Song by Joy Division

Song by Joy Division

from the album Unknown Pleasures
- Released: 15 June 1979
- Recorded: 1–17 April 1979
- Studio: Strawberry, Stockport
- Genre: Post-punk; gothic rock
- Length: 4:47
- Label: Factory
- Songwriters: Bernard Sumner; Peter Hook; Stephen Morris; Ian Curtis
- Producers: Martin Hannett, Joy Division

"New Dawn Fades" is a song by English rock band Joy Division from their 1979 debut album Unknown Pleasures. The song opens with a backwards and heavily modified sample from a previous song, "Insight", presumably added by Martin Hannett post-production.

The song relies on an ascending guitar riff by Bernard Sumner played against a descending bass riff by Peter Hook. The song uses the same progression throughout, but grows in intensity as the song progresses, reaching its peak with Ian Curtis singing "Me, seeing me this time, hoping for something else", and ending with a guitar solo. The song closes side one of Unknown Pleasures. It's also one of few Joy Division songs with two distinct guitars playing, one distorted and one a clean electric guitar picking notes from the guitar chords.

== Cover versions ==
It has been covered by Moby, whose version was featured in the 1995 film Heat. He later made a guest contribution on New Order's own cover of the song that appeared on the 24 Hour Party People soundtrack.

There is also a version by Red Hot Chili Peppers guitarist John Frusciante.

Ambient techno act The Sight Below covered it on its second album It All Falls Apart, featuring vocals by Jesy Fortino of Tiny Vipers.

Rheinallt H Rowlands recorded a Welsh language version of the song, "Gwawr Newydd Yn Cilio".

The American grindcore band Graf Orlock used elements of the song in the last track "Quick on the Trigger" of their Heat-themed EP Los Angeles.
