= Apegenine recordings =

Canadian independent record label

- Founded: 2003
- Distributor(s): Baked Goods; Boomkat
- Genre: Electronica, Electropop, Ambient
- Country of origin: Canada
- Location: Montreal, Quebec
- Official website: Apegenine.com

Apegenine recordings (or Apeg) is a Canadian independent record label. It was established as a Genshi Media subdivision in 2003 by Vincent Fugere and has released music by Montreal's most prominent electronic artist David Kristian, Emanuele Errante, Khonnor, Klaus Lunde (Xerxes), Julien Neto among others.

The music it releases is conceptual inspired by experimental, contemporary and pop music.

New releases include albums by demoscene star and former Beanbag vocalist Hunz, known Renoise user Kaneel and new Portuguese electro acoustic pop group papercutz.

== Selected discography ==
1. Emanuele Errante - Migrations - 2007
2. David Kristian - Rhythms for a rainy season - 2005

== See also ==
- List of record labels
