= Nellie Bowles =

American journalist (born 1987)

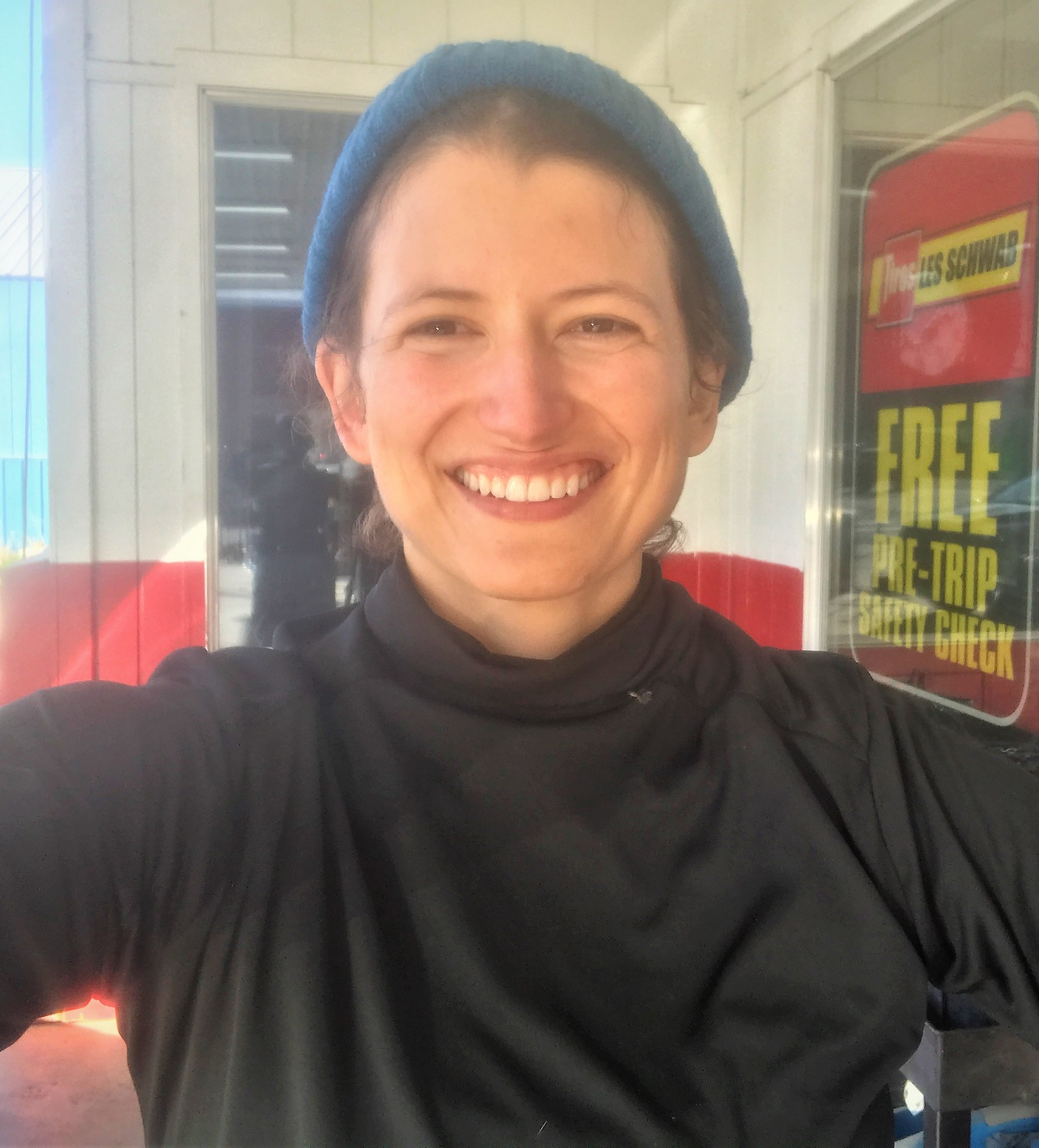
- Bowles in 2019
- Born: April 20, 1987 (age 39); San Francisco, California, U.S.
- Education: Columbia University (BA)
- Occupation: Journalist
- Spouse: Bari Weiss (m. 2021)
- Children: 2
- Writing career
- Years active: 2017–present
- Notable awards: Fulbright Program
- Website: Official website

Nellie Bowles (born April 20, 1987) is an American journalist and satirist. Before co-founding The Free Press with her spouse Bari Weiss, she was noted for covering the technology world of Silicon Valley. Bowles has written for the English-language Argentine daily the Buenos Aires Herald, the San Francisco Chronicle, The California Sunday Magazine, the technology journalism website Recode, the British daily The Guardian beginning in 2016, then for Vice News, The New York Times, and most recently The Free Press.

== Career ==
From 2017 to 2021, Bowles covered technology and culture for The New York Times, mostly while based in the San Francisco Bay Area. In 2020, she received the Robert F. Kennedy Journalism Award and the Gerald Loeb Award for investigative reporting along with two colleagues for her investigation into online child abuse; according to editor Dean Murphy, their "deep, persistent and compassionate reporting" served to "hold both government and big tech accountable, and tell the stories of untold children who have endured this abuse in silence." Bowles covered the technology and business world of high-tech startups and venture capital, and has written about personalities such as Elon Musk, Eric Schmidt, and iHeartMedia CEO Bob Pittman. She covered the exclusive conference of technology CEOs called Further Future, and has written about subjects such as doxxing and cryptocurrency. She appeared twice on the Charlie Rose show.

Bowles's reporting is often controversial; for example, her account of her interview with Jordan Peterson attracted much attention. She has moderated televised discussions on free speech in the digital age, and has written about gender equality in the tech world. Her reports on the conflict between Israelis and Palestinians have sometimes generated additional controversy. Harvard professor and legal scholar Lawrence Lessig sued Bowles and The New York Times for defamation over her reporting on Lessig's writings about Jeffrey Epstein's donations to the MIT Media Lab in the Times. Lessig dropped the suit after the headline and lede were changed to better represent his views.

In January 2021, Bowles and Bari Weiss launched the online newsletter Common Sense. The publication was renamed The Free Press in 2022. The Free Press is now the top-earning Substack publication, with more than 1,740,000 subscribers. Bowles is the company's head of strategy and writes a weekly column called TGIF, a satirical roundup of current news. Her New York Times story "The Sperm Kings Have a Problem: Too Much Demand" was turned into a feature-length documentary, produced by the Times and FX and released in 2024. It served as the inspiration for Lance Oppenheim’s Spermworld.

Her first book, Morning After the Revolution, was released in 2024 by Thesis, an imprint of Penguin Random House. In the book, Bowles alleges that many U.S. institutions, including the governments of large cities and legacy media outlets, have been captured by far-left political actors. In The Washington Post, Becca Rothfeld wrote, "The book's ambient contempt for progressives is legible; its actual thesis much less so." In The Guardian, Charles Kaiser wrote of the book's factual inaccuracies, "Fortunately for her—but unfortunately for us—her publisher, a new Penguin Random House imprint, Thesis, does not appear to impose any outdated fact-checking requirements. The only visible standard here is, if it's shocking, we'll print it." Comparing Bowles unfavorably to Tom Wolfe in The New York Times Book Review, Laura Kipnis wrote, "where Wolfe was a precision-guided stiletto, Bowles is more of a dull blade, ridiculing her former colleagues by saddling them with laughably vacuous thoughts and dreams." Kipnis concludes: "the book's central fallacy is that idiocy on the left requires moving to the right. It doesn't. It's eminently possible for people with brains to make distinctions and stick to their principles, if they have any. And, by the way, you're not going to find any fewer authoritarians and idiots by switching sides."

== Personal life ==
Bowles is a descendant of Henry Miller, who was dubbed the "Cattle King of California" and was once one of the largest landowners in the U.S., and of Thomas Crowley, who founded the transportation and logistics company Crowley Maritime. She graduated from the Cate School in 2006 and Columbia University in 2010. Bowles is married to political commentator and journalist Bari Weiss, a relationship she says led her to convert to Judaism. She also says the conversion was part of a personal drive to be more empathy-driven in her reporting. They have a daughter, born in 2022, and a son, born in 2024. In 2019 and 2025, Bowles said she met Jeffrey Epstein in 2018.
