= Murmur (EP) =

EP by The Sight Below
- Released: October 27, 2009
- Genre: Ambient techno, shoegazing
- Label: Ghostly International
- Producer: The Sight Below

The Sight Below chronology
Glider (2008)	Murmur (2009)	It All Falls Apart (2010)

Professional ratings
Review scores
Source	Rating
FACT Magazine	Link
Surfing on a Stream	link

Murmur is the second EP from The Sight Below, released on October 27, 2009. It contains two new songs and three remixes of other The Sight Below songs (two from Glider and one from No Place for Us) by Eluvium, Simon Scott, and iconic Norwegian ambient producer Biosphere.

== Track listing ==
1. Murmur
2. Wishing Me Asleep
3. The Sunset Passage (Biosphere Remix) [Vinyl Exclusive]
4. No Place for Us (Eluvium Remix) [Digital Bonus]
5. At First Touch (Simon Scott Remix) [Digital Bonus]

== Reviews ==
- FACT magazine Link
- The Stranger
- Surfing on a Stream Link
