= The Sight Below =

American musician

- The Sight Below performing a live audio/visual set at NODE Festival in Modena, Italy June 6, 2009

Background information
- Origin: Seattle, Washington, United States
- Genres: Ambient techno, shoegazing, electronic
- Occupations: Producer, composer, musician
- Instruments: Guitar, laptop
- Years active: 2008–present
- Label: Ghostly International
- Website: http://www.myspace.com/thesightbelow

The Sight Below is an American ambient techno/shoegaze act from Seattle, Washington. Its main member is the American post-minimalist composer Rafael Anton Irisarri.

Sam Valenti IV signed The Sight Below to his Ghostly International imprint in 2008 after listening to a demo tape. A promotional EP No Place for Us was soon released by the label as a free MP3 download on August 26, 2008.

The Sight Below debuted its live set at Seattle's KEXP radio station on September 20, 2008. The in-studio session was recorded and is available on Ghostly's website as a podcast (GhostlyCast #18). A well-received performance followed at the Ghostly International showcase during Decibel Festival. These performances paved the way for an extensive European tour that saw the artist perform at 18 different cities in the continent, including Unsound festival in Kraków, Poland, EME Festival in Lisbon, Portugal, S.O.Y. Festival in Nantes, France and TimeZones Festival in Bari, Italy.

The Sight Below's debut album Glider was released in the United States in November 2008 and January 2009 worldwide. It is available as both a physical and digital release. The album was very well received by the press and music community, including praise from Radiohead's Thom Yorke, who charted "At First Touch" on his January 6, 2009 "Office Chart" posting on the band's website Dead Air Space.

Murmur EP followed in 2009, including remixes by Biosphere, Eluvium and Simon Scott (of Slowdive).

The Sight Below's second full-length, It All Falls Apart, was released on April 6, 2010. It features music written with the aforementioned Simon Scott and a cover version of Joy Division's "New Dawn Fades" (with guest vocals by Tiny Vipers). Described by All Music Guide as "impeccably made ambient thump-and-drone", Pitchfork Media called it "A beautifully bleak cloud of sound" while XLR8R magazine gave it a 9/10 ranking and praised it as "an astounding range of visceral sonic possibilities…a hurricane passing over an ocean, gathering heat and force while simultaneously cooling the waters below."

== Live performances ==
The Sight Below has performed extensively throughout North America and Europe. During the multimedia live performances, the artist creates his own visuals, manipulating images and footage until they are only recognizable as slow moving shapes, providing a counterpoint to the heavily treated wall of guitar textures.

Soon after the Glider release a US tour followed in February 2009 with labelmate Lusine. Later on, appearances at DEMF (Detroit, Michigan) and MUTEK (Montreal, Quebec, Canada) would continue showcasing The Sight Below's brand of immersive guitar music and visual art integration.

In June 2009, The Sight Below performed at Sónar Festival (Barcelona, Spain), this time joined by Slowdive member Simon Scott on guitars and vocals. Together they toured throughout the Summer in the EU and UK, including a show at the historical Sacred Trinity Church in Manchester, London's The Luminaire club, and a notoriously loud performance during Ghostly's 10-Year Anniversary party at Berlin's infamous Berghain nightclub on June 26, 2009.

On tour with Pantha Du Prince in Vancouver, September 21, 2010

== Collaborations ==
In the studio, The Sight Below has worked extensively with Benoît Pioulard and the aforementioned Scott and Tiny Vipers. He's also remixed School of Seven Bells, Detroit's Echospace, and Germany's Pantha Du Prince.

Irisarri has also collaborated with renowned Austrian guitarist Fennesz, performing live at Decibel Festival in Seattle and Interferenze Festival in Italy.

In January 2011, Irisarri collaborated with Benoît Pioulard on a tribute to Broadcast's Trish Keenan, covering the track "Until Then", from the band's 2000 album The Noise Made By People.

== Discography ==
Studio albums

- Glider (2008)
- It All Falls Apart (2010)
- Glider (Expanded Edition) (2011)
- Glider 10 (2018 Remaster) (2018)
- Glider 10: Reworks (2018)

EPs

- No Place for Us (2008)
- Murmur (2009)
- Unfurled EP (2015)

Remixes

- "Ultravioleta" remix for papercutz | Ultravioleta rmx's Apegenine recordings (2008)
- "Bye Bye Bye" remix for School of Seven Bells | Vagrant Ghostly International (2010)
- "Substraktive" remix for CV313 | Echospace Detroit (2010)
- "A Nomad's Retreat" remix for Pantha Du Prince | Rough Trade (2011)
- "N-Plants_Remixes" remixes for Biosphere | Touch (2011)
- "Seadance" remix for Saroos | Alien Transistor (2013)
- "The Sun" by The Naked and Famous (2013)
- "Waltz" by The Naked and Famous (2014)

== Videos ==
- Further Away Filmed at Deception Pass (2008)
