= Decibel Festival =

Former US music festival

Decibel International Festival of Electronic Music Performance, Visual Art + New Media
- Genre: Electronic Music
- Location: USA: Seattle, Washington
- Years active: 2003 - 2015
- Founders: Sean Horton
- Website: http://www.dbfestival.com

The Decibel Festival was an annual music and digital arts festival in Seattle, Washington, which featured live electronic music performances, visual arts, and new media.

== History ==
The festival was launched in 2003 by Sean Horton and a team of volunteer staff. The festival consisted of concerts, performances, film screenings, exhibitions, panels, lectures, workshops, and commissioned works across locations throughout Seattle, including the Capitol Hill neighborhood and Downtown Seattle.

Audiences grew from 2,500 to 25,000 over the festival's 12 years.

Following years of unsuccessful efforts to become a non-profit organization, and Horton's move to LA to work for Red Bull, The Decibel Festival ended in 2015. The founder described this as an "extended break."

Since 2015, Decibel has continued to host and promote smaller events, describing itself as "a Los Angeles-based event/production company." These events are chronicled on the organization's social media.

Decibel organized a weekend of events in 2023 to celebrate 20-years of Decibel. The event title was stylized as DecibelXX.

== Artists ==
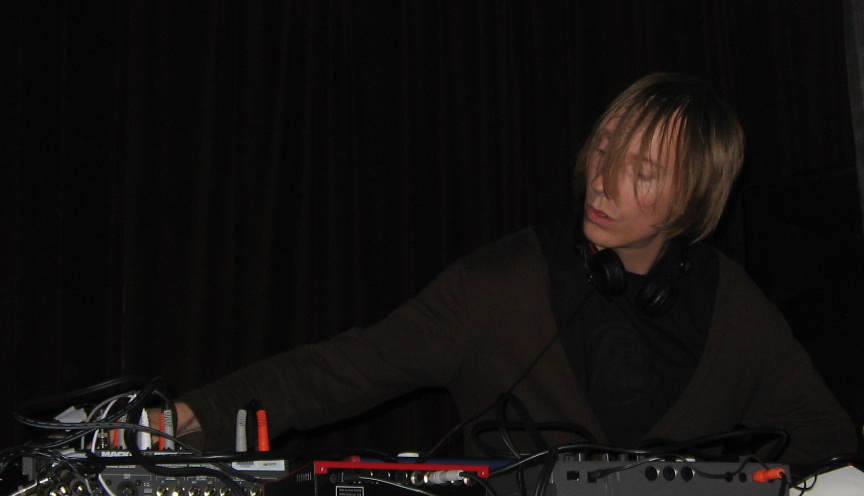
Andreas Tilliander (Seattle 2006)

The Decibel Festival hosted over 1,100 acts, ranging from underground dance and experimental electronic music to transmedial art.

Selected festival lineups:

- 2015 lineup
- 2014 lineup
- 2013 lineup
- 2012 lineup

Performers included:

- 3 Channels
- 12th Planet
- Addison Groove
- Akufen
- The Album Leaf
- Alexi Delano
- Alter Ego
- Amon Tobin ISAM LIVE
- Apparat
- AraabMuzik
- Atom™
- Autechre
- Baths
- Ben Klock
- Ben Frost
- Biosphere
- Bok Bok
- Bonobo
- Booka Shade
- Boys Noize
- Breakage
- Bruno Pronsato
- Carl Craig
- Caspa
- Catz 'n Dogz
- Charli XCX
- Christopher Willits
- Claude VonStroke
- Cobblestone Jazz
- Dabrye
- Daedelus
- Dan Bell
- DARKSIDE
- Deadbeat
- Deadmau5
- The Dead Texan
- Derrick May
- Dinky
- Diplo
- DJ Krush
- dOP
- Duke Dumont
- Egyptrixx
- Empire of the Sun
- Erykah Badu
- Ellen Allien
- Eluvium
- FaltyDL
- fennesz
- The Field
- Flying Lotus
- Flume
- Four Tet
- Frank Bretschneider
- Frivolous
- Funkstörung
- The Gaslamp Killer
- Geographer
- Girl Unit
- The Glitch Mob
- Gold Panda
- Green Velvet
- Gui Boratto
- Harold Budd
- ill-esha
- Isolee
- Itak Tek
- Jacob London
- James Blake
- Jeff Samuel
- John Tejada
- Joker
- Justice
- Kangding Ray
- Kevin Saunderson
- KiloWatts
- Kimbra
- Ladytron
- Lorde
- Loscil
- Lusine
- Machinedrum
- Mad Professor
- Mala
- Marcus Nikolai
- Marcel Dettmann
- Martin Buttrich
- Mary Anne Hobbs
- Matias Aguayo
- Matmos
- Matthew Dear
- Max Cooper
- Meat Beat Manifesto
- Michael Mayer
- Moby
- Mochipet
- Moderat
- Modeselektor
- Monolake
- Mount Kimbie
- Mountains
- Move D
- Mt. Eden
- Murcof
- Nicolas Jaar
- Nils Frahm
- Nina Kraviz
- Nortec Collective
- Odesza
- The Orb
- Orbital
- Pepe Bradock
- Quantic
- Ramadanman
- Richie Hawtin
- Robert Babicz
- Robert Hood
- Robin Guthrie
- Sascha Funke
- School of Seven Bells
- Scott Pagano
- Scuba
- Shackleton
- The Sight Below
- Simian Mobile Disco
- Smash TV
- Soul Clap
- Spacetime Continuum
- Speedy J
- Star Slinger
- Starkey
- Stars of the Lid
- Strategy
- Styrofoam
- Subtle
- Switch
- T.Raumschmiere
- Telefon Tel Aviv
- Theo Parrish
- Thievery Corporation
- Thomas Fehlmann
- Tiger & Woods
- Tim Exile
- Tim Hecker
- Tipper
- Trentemoller
- TOKiMONSTA
- Tycho
- VibeSquad
- Vladislav Delay
- Voodeux
- Wighnomy Brothers
- Wolf + Lamb
- Zedd
- Zola Jesus
- Zomby

== Venues ==
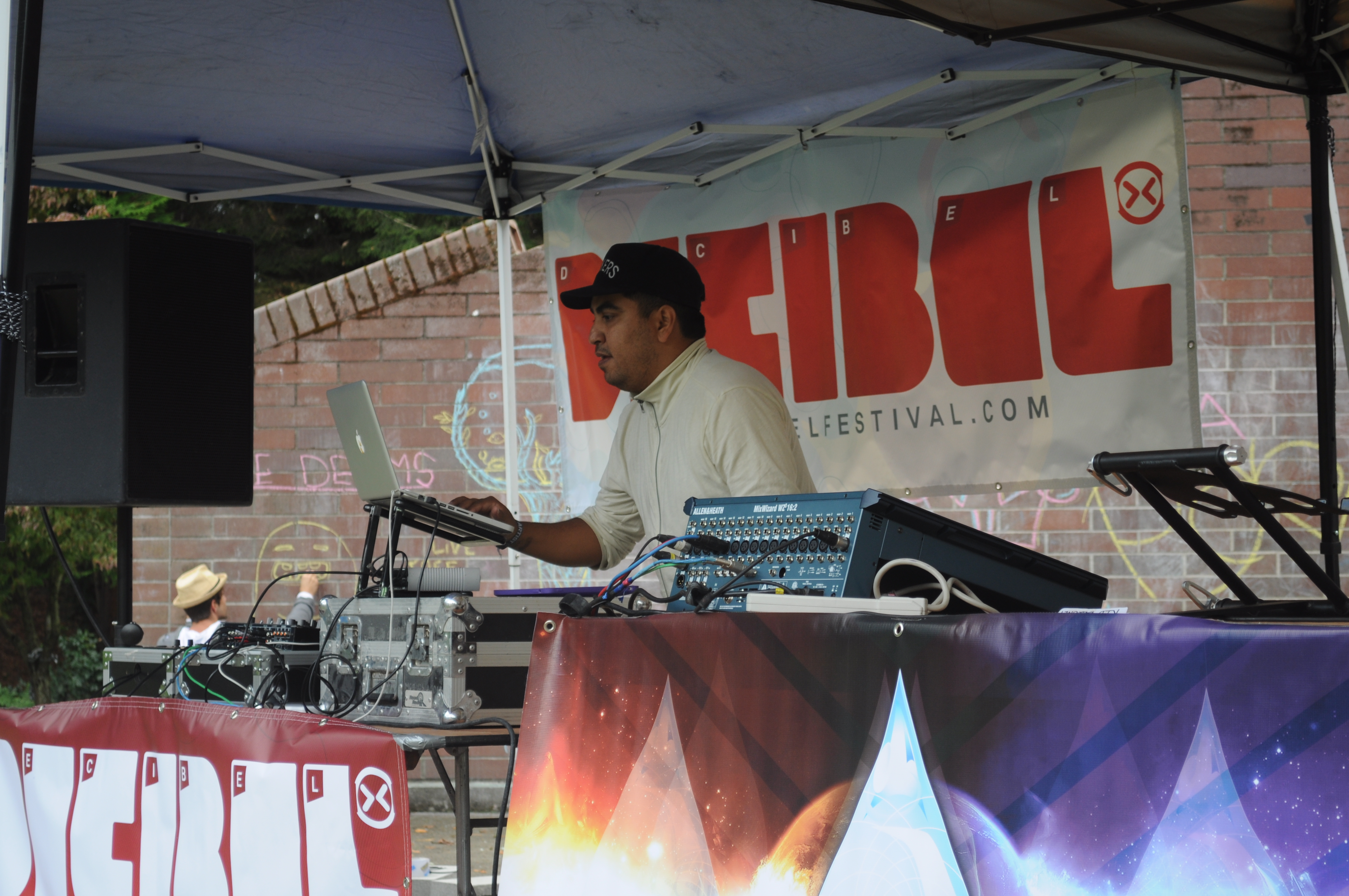
Unidentified DJ at a free show at Seattle's Volunteer Park during Decibel Fest 2011

Throughout its duration, The Decibel Festival was hosted at various venues across the Seattle area, including The Showbox, The Showbox SoDo, Q Nightclub, Neumos, The Crocodile, Illsley Ball Nordstrom Recital Hall, The Triple Door, Islander Cruise Ship, EMP Museum, and Re-Bar.

The Decibel Festival was a member of ICAS (International Cities of Advanced Sound).

== See also ==
- List of electronic music festivals
