= Catarina Miranda =

Portuguese singer and songwriter (born 1990)

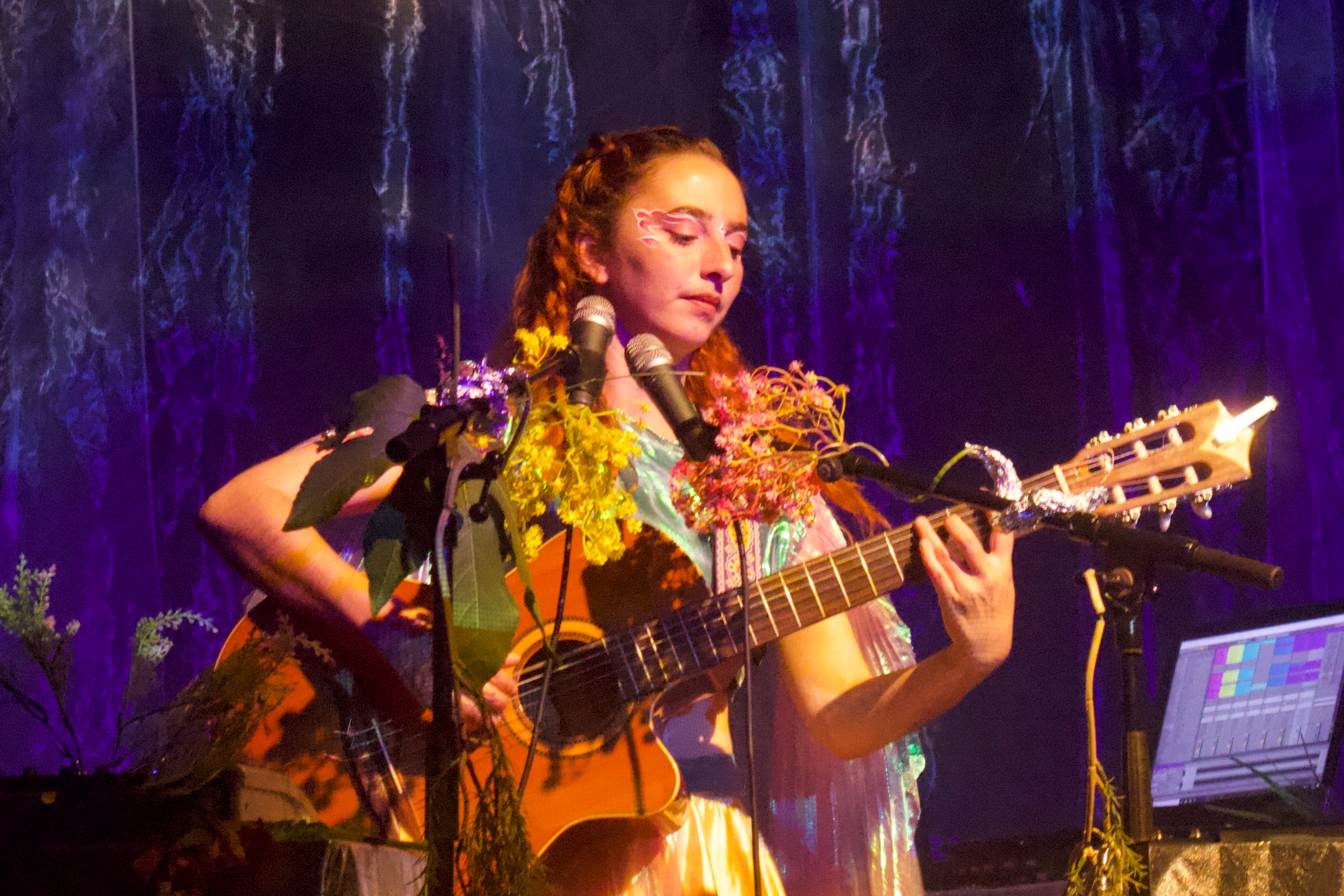
- emmy Curl performing in 2025

Background information
- Also known as: emmy Curl
- Born: 1990 (age 35–36); Vila Real, Portugal
- Occupations: singer; songwriter; musician
- Instruments: vocals; guitar
- Years active: 2007–present
- Labels: Kimahera; Cuca Monga
- Member of: Deep:Her; MIRADOURA
- Website: emmycurl.com

Catarina Miranda (born in Vila Real, Trás-os-Montes in 1990) is a Portuguese singer and songwriter also known by the stage name emmy Curl. She has released several EPs and albums.

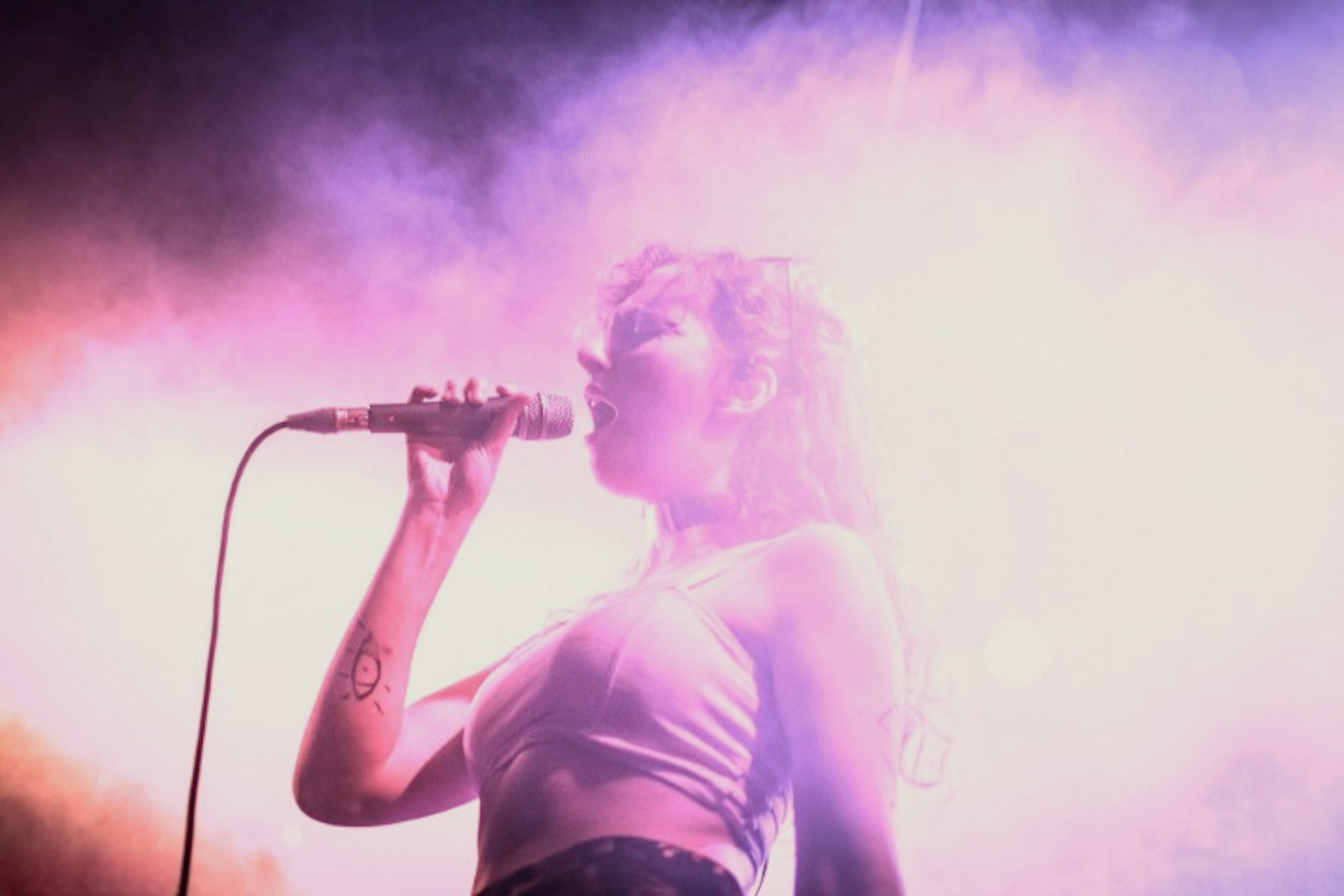
Catarina Miranda performing with :papercutz in 2019.

As a singer, she is known for being part of the studio and live recording for several national and international tours of the electronic pop project papercutz.

== Eurovision Pre-selections ==
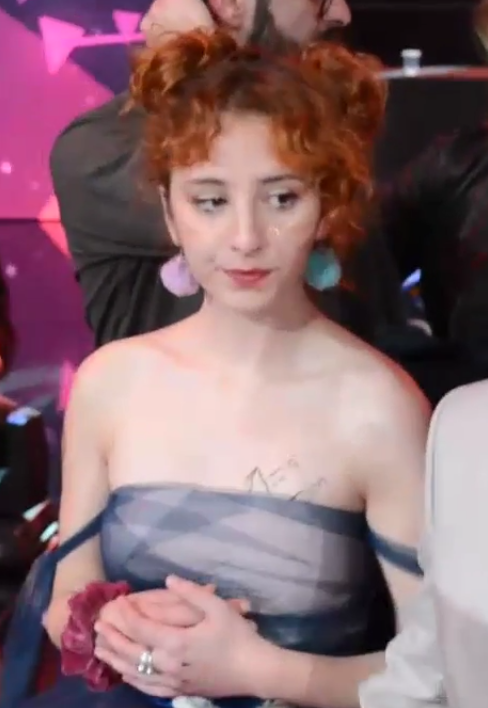
Catarina Miranda during Festival da Canção in 2018.

=== 2018 ===
In 2018, Catarina competed at the 2018 Festival da Canção with the theme Para Sorrir Eu Não Preciso De Nada (To Smile I Don't Need Nothing), written by Camila Ferraro and composed by Júlio Resende, taking second place in the competition and being the most voted for by the jury.

=== 2025 ===
In 2025 she was invited to take part in Festival da Canção again. The song which she prepared is titled Rapsódia da Paz. The style of the song is a continuation of the style from the album Pastoral.

== Prémio José Afonso Award ==
In 2025, her album "Pastoral" was awarded the José Afonso Award in the 37th edition of the competition, and thus she joined the ranks of previous winners such as Gisela João and Mariza.

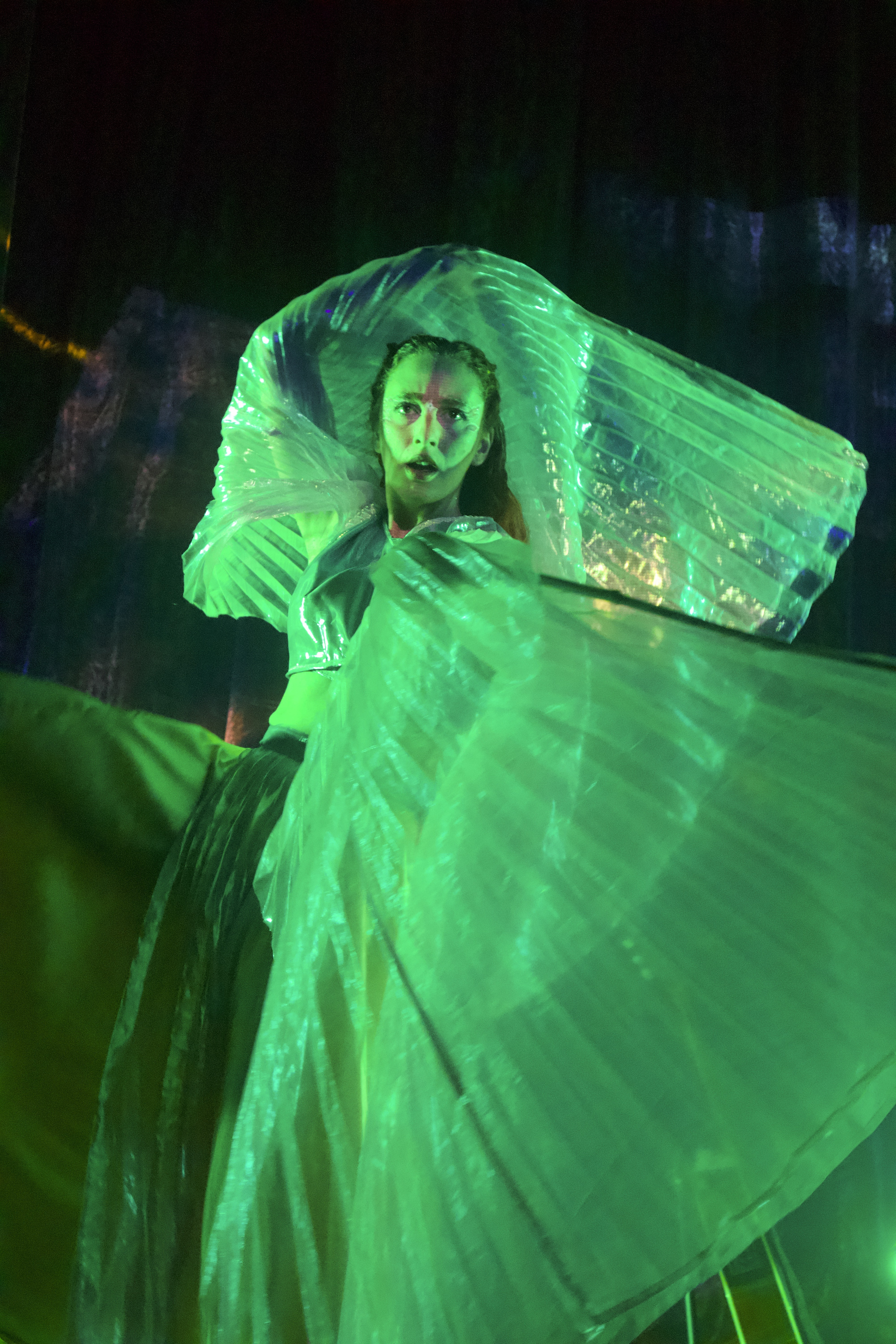
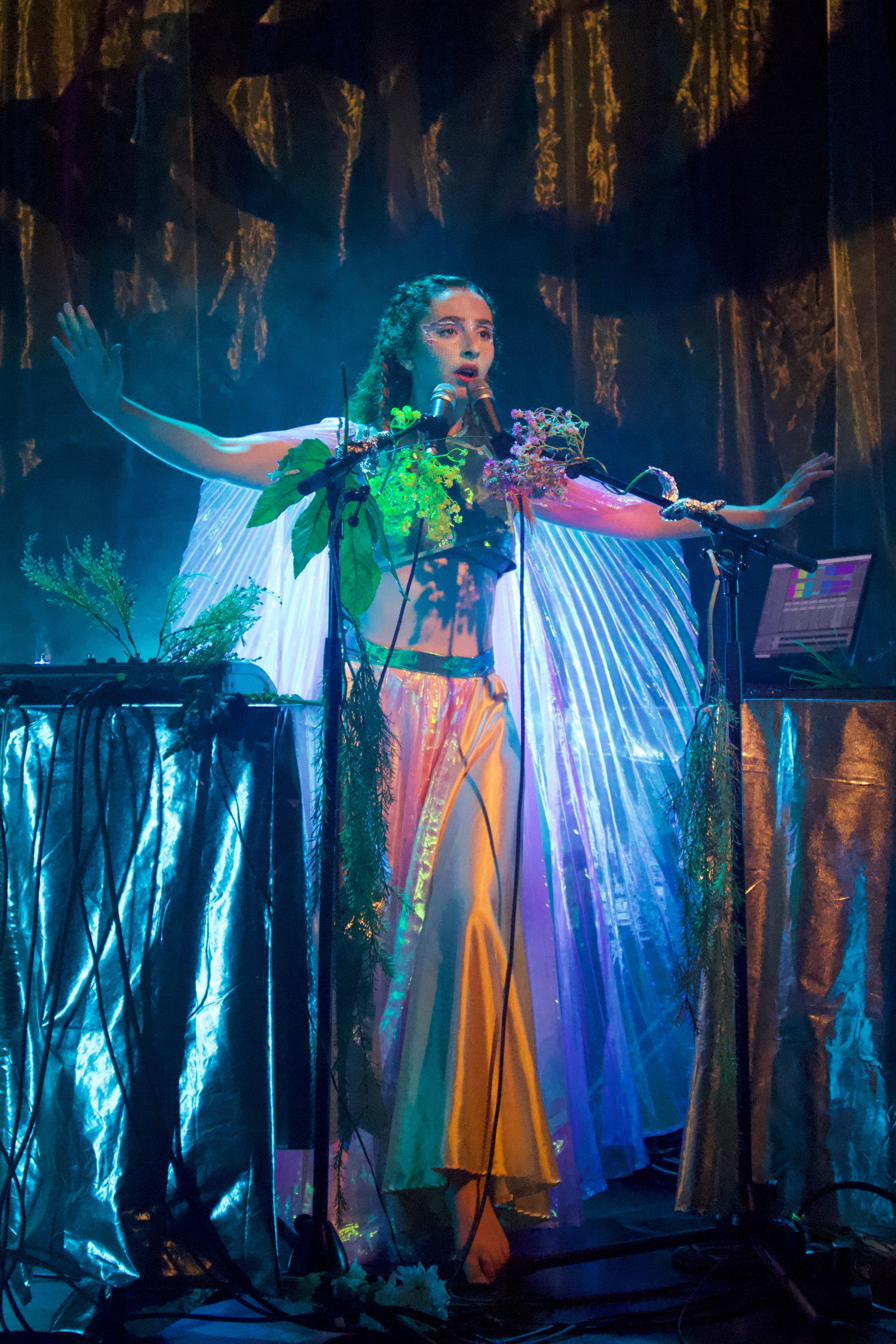
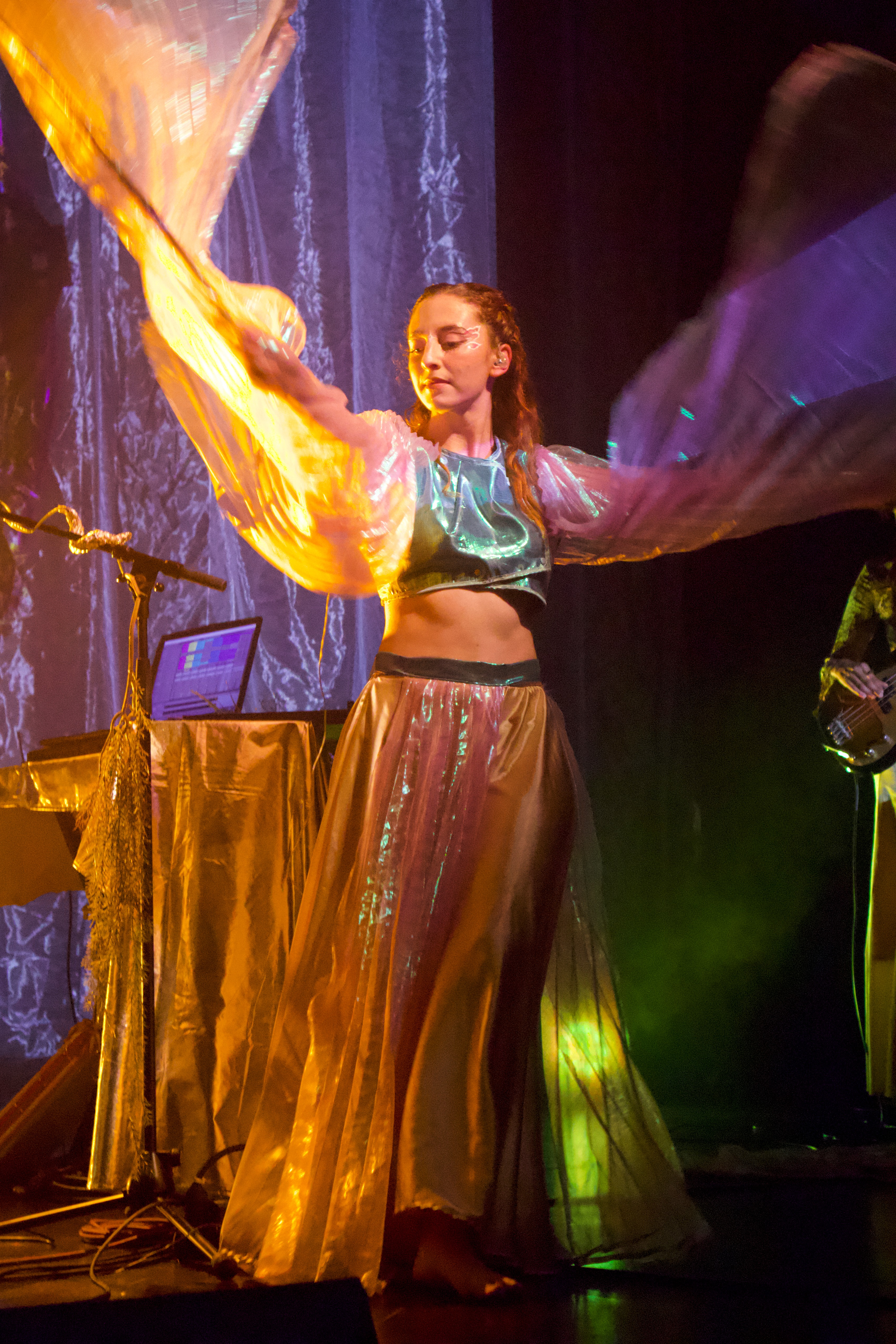
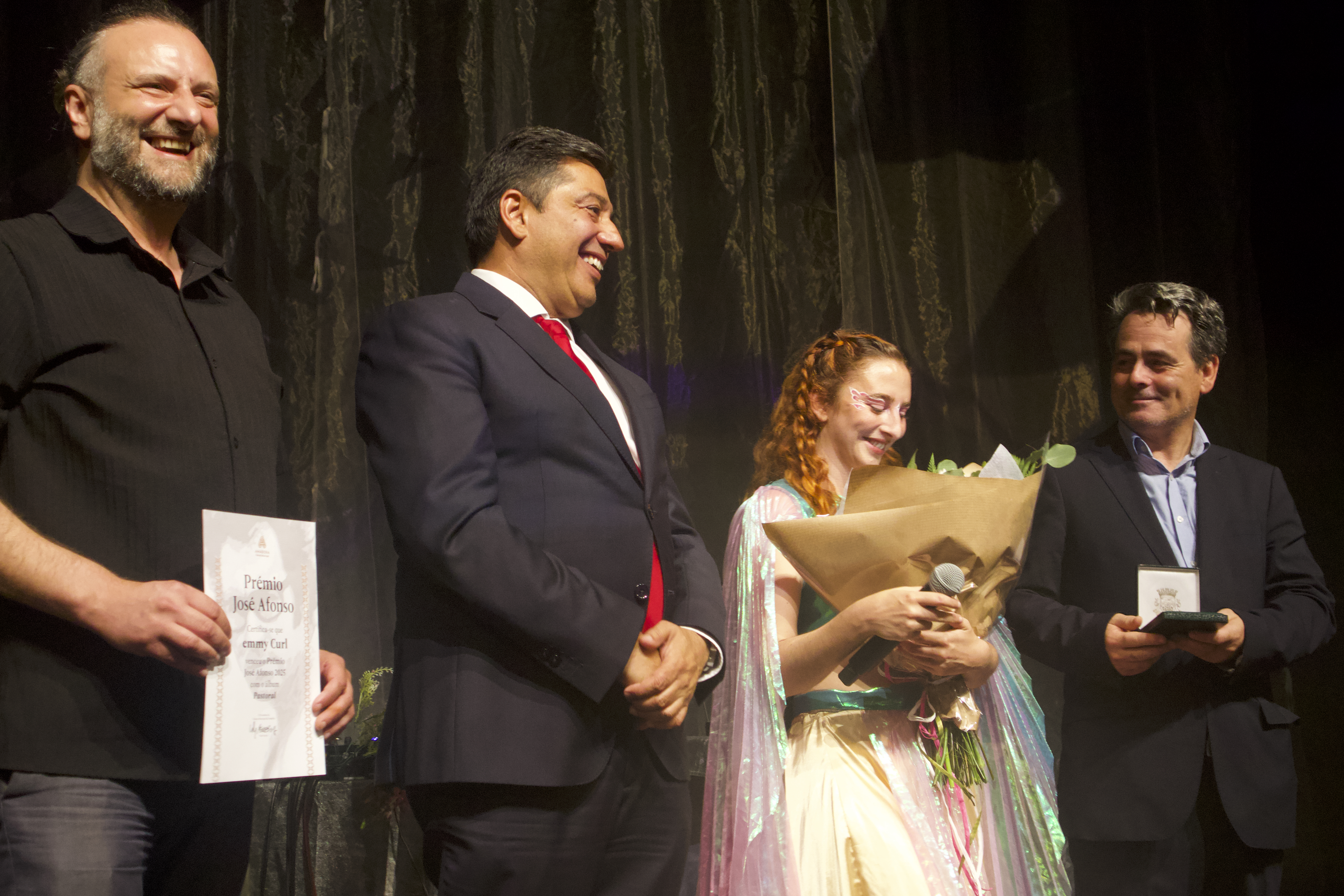
emmy Curl entertaining the audience and accepting the Prémio José Afonso award at the 2025 ceremony

== Discography ==
=== emmy Curl ===
==== Albums ====
- 2013 – Cherry Luna
- 2015 – Navia
- 2019 – ØPorto
- 2022 – 15 Years
- 2024 – Pastoral
- 2026 – Pastoral 2.0

==== EP ====
- 2007 – Ether
- 2010 – Birds Among the Lines (Optimus Discos)
- 2012 – Origins
- 2020 – HomeWorks 15–19

==== Singles ====
- 2013 – Nobody Else But You
- 2014 – Come Closer
- 2023 – Mudança
- 2023 – Botar Água na Vinha

=== Deep:Her ===
==== Albums ====
- 2012 – Deep:Her

== Videography ==
| Year | Title | Album |
|---|---|---|
| 2020 | Kept Me in the Storm | ØPorto |
| 2023 | Mirandum | Pastoral |
| 2023 | Mudança | Pastoral |
| 2023 | Botar Água Na Vinha | Pastoral |
| 2024 | Senhora do Almortão | Pastoral |
| 2024 | Candeia Amor | Pastoral |
