= Soy Festival =

Music festival in Nantes, France

Soy Festival is a yearly music festival happening in the autumn in Nantes, France. The festival focuses on avant-garde rock, experimental rock, noise rock, and other experimental music genres. The concerts take place in different locations in Nantes (Olympic, Lieu Unique, Pannonica, Barakason, Live, Bobard, Violon Dingue, Maison de quartier de Doulon, Rue'pture, le Blockhaus DY10, Planétarium, Ferrailleur)

== Pre Soy (2001) ==
Billy Mahonie, Purr, My Own, Pull

== Soy 1, 2003 ==
Why?, Tepr, Matt Elliott, Many Fingers

== Soy 2, 2004 ==
Old Time Relijun, Julie Doiron, Zu, Flotation Toy Warning, Minor Majority, Victory Hall, Thomas Belhom, Park Attack, Encre, My Name Is Nobody, Ichabod Crane, Bocage.

== Soy 3, 2005 ==
Dirty Three, Josh Pearson, Animal Collective, Elysian Fields, Berg Sans Nipple, Piano Magic, Fruitkey, Tazio and Boy, Trumans Water, Friction, Room 204, Dirge

== Soy 4, 2006 ==
Howe Gelb, Carla Bozulich, Hrsta, Grizzly Bear, Part Chimp, Jel, Charlottefield, Half Asleep, The Healthy Boy, Brian Straw, Soon, Lichens, Bird Show, Marissa Nadler, Kria Brekkan, Cyann and Ben

== Soy 5, 2007 ==
Zita Swoon, Stanley Brinks (aka Herman Düne, Zëro (Ex Bastard), Rhys Chatham + guests (Guitar Trio project), Califone, SJ Esau (Anticon) and others

== Soy 6, 2008 ==
Why?, Son Lux, Volcano, Acid Mother Temple, No Age, Neptune, The Oscillation, Dwayne Sodahberk, Stearica, Pillars and Tongues, Chris Corsano & Mick Flower, Daniel Higgs, NLF3, Eric Chenaux, Six Organs of Admittance, Thank You, Skyphone, The Sight Below, CJ Boyd, Chris Garneau.

== Soy 7, 2009 ==
Animal Hospital, Fol Chen, Ichabod Crane, Banjo Or Freakout, Soap&Skin, Do Make Say Think, Part Chimp, Themselves, HEALTH, Clues, Thank You, Voice of the Seven Woods, Skeletons, Room 204, Benoit Pioulard, James Blackshaw, Matteah Baim, Pictureplane, Get Back Guinozzi, All in the Golden Afternoon, Mountains, The Happiness Project, Stars Like Flash, Our Brother the Native, Alexis Gideon, Action Beat and others.
