= Destination Time: Tomorrow =

Destination Time Tomorrow

EP by Graf Orlock
- Released: April 24, 2007
- Genre: Grindcore, hardcore punk
- Length: 16:06
- Label: Level Plane
- Producer: Ronald Uruk

Graf Orlock chronology
Destination Time Yesterday (2006)	Destination Time Tomorrow (2007)	Destination Time Today (2009)

Destination Time Tomorrow is an EP by grindcore band Graf Orlock. This is the second chapter of the Destination Time trilogy, named after the controversial UCLA screenplay. Tomorrow contains songs featuring movies from the 1980s through the 2000s and films influenced by future elements including science fiction. The album packaging featured the CD wrapped in a cardboard "facehugger" from Alien, and the 10" LP has a pop-up "chestburster" in the middle of its gatefold cover.

== Reception ==
Professional ratings
Review scores
Source	Rating
PopMatters	7/10 stars
Punknews.org	3/5 stars

Destination Time Today was generally well received by critics. Sloane Daley of Punknews.org called the album "an interesting take on grind", saying that "the musical accompaniment with its hectic chord progressions and alternating shrill screams and gruff yelling provides an essential atmosphere". Chris Gramlich of Exclaim! said the band is "awesome from the get go", and praised the "unrelenting combination of confrontation...with numerous film samples". Adrien Begrand of PopMatters described the album as "full-throttle, top-notch grindcore", praising "arrangements that alternate from spazzy, to crushing, to downright catchy".

Critics also enjoyed the packaging and artwork, but several called the packaging "impractical".

== Track listing ==
1. "Game Time" – 1:54
2. "A Shocking Interrogation" – 2:02
3. "A Misappropriation of Sector Resources" – 2:09
4. "Corpserate Greed" – 2:18
5. "A Waste of Ammo" – 1:35
6. "I Think I'm Going to Love the Future" – 2:13
7. "Todd and Janelle" – 2:04
8. "The Dream Left Behind" – 1:56

== Personnel ==
- "Kalvin Kristoff" – vocals
- "Jason Schmidt" – guitar, vocals
- "Sven Calhoun" – bass
- "Alan Hunter" – drums
