= Destination Time: Yesterday =

Destination Time Yesterday

Studio album by Graf Orlock
- Released: June 27, 2006
- Genres: Grindcore, hardcore punk
- Length: 26:55
- Label: Level Plane
- Producer: Ronald Uruk

Graf Orlock chronology
Split with Greyskull (2005)	Destination Time Yesterday (2006)	Destination Time Tomorrow (2007)

Destination Time Yesterday is the first album by grindcore band Graf Orlock. This is the first chapter of the Destination Time trilogy named after the controversial UCLA screenplay. Yesterday contains songs featuring movies from the 1980s and movies influenced by events during the 1980s including the Cold War.

== Track listing ==
1. "Tactical Destruction" - 1:50
2. "50 Year Storm" - 1:43
3. "Not Economically Viable" - 1:23
4. "Improvement Society" - 1:07
5. "Dutch and the Demon" - 1:21
6. "Prove It" - 1:45
7. "Massacre!/Main Title" - 2:04
8. "Captives of the Thuggee" - 2:14
9. "Rotten Kid" - 1:54
10. "Hauser" - 1:48
11. "Personal Stuff" - 1:41
12. "Panic at the Galleria" - 1:31
13. "Border Crossing" - 1:14
14. "Marmot" - 1:21
15. "A Chat with the Pentagon" - 1:36
16. Untitled (Instrumental) - 2:29

== Personnel ==
- "Kalvin Kristoff" – vocals
- "Jason Schmidt" – guitar, vocals
- "Sven Calhoun" – bass
- "Alan Hunter" – drums
