= Doombox =

EP by Graf Orlock
- Released: January 18, 2011
- Genre: Grindcore
- Length: 11:48
- Label: Vitriol

Graf Orlock chronology
Destination Time Today (2009)	Doombox (2011)	Los Angeles (2012)

Doombox is an EP by Graf Orlock. It was released by Vitriol Records on January 18, 2011. It was released as a 10" record, pressed on black (limited to 150) and clear (limited to 1350). The record came with a foldout boom-box replica, and a CD with all six songs plus the Destination Time trilogy songs.

== Reception ==
Professional ratings
Review scores
Source	Rating
Rock Sound	8/10

Doombox was generally well received by critics. Mike Kemp of Rock Sound enjoyed the EP's "shouty, expletive-ridden grindcore", and praised the inclusion of the band's Destination Time trilogy on the CD. Chris Ayers of Exclaim! called Doombox "categorically crushing", comparing the band to Pig Destroyer and Brutal Truth, and declared the album "a...contender for the year's best album".

== Track listing ==
1. "Wrecking Crew" – 2:01
2. "Job Hunt" – 1:28
3. "Arrested At Lunch" – 2:09
4. "South Central" – 2:05
5. "1993; A Week Before Graduation" – 2:12
6. "New Year's Eve 1999" – 1:58

== Personnel ==
- "Karl Bournze" – vocals
- "Jason Schmidt" – guitar, vocals
- "Svarn Kalhoune" – bass
- "Alan Hunter" – drums
