= It All Falls Apart =

Studio album by The Sight Below
- Released: April 6, 2010
- Recorded: 2008–2009, Seattle, Washington; Cambridge, England
- Genre: Ambient techno, shoegazing
- Length: 49:58
- Label: Ghostly International
- Producer: The Sight Below, Simon Scott

The Sight Below chronology
Murmur (2009)	It All Falls Apart (2010)

Professional ratings
Review scores
Source	Rating
Allmusic	link
Beats Per Minute	(75%) link
Foxy Digitalis	link
Groovemine	link
The Milk Factory	link
Pitchfork Media	(7.2/10) link
Popmatters	link
Skeleton Crew Quarterly	(76%) link
Tiny Mix Tapes	link
XLR8R	link

It All Falls Apart is the second full-length album from American ambient techno musician The Sight Below. It is the first album as a full collaboration between The Sight Below and former Slowdive and Lowgold drummer Simon Scott.

== Track listing ==
1. "Shimmer" – 6:14
2. "Fervent" – 5:09
3. "Through the Gaps in the Land" – 9:21
4. "Burn Me Out from the Inside" – 6:07
5. "It All Falls Apart" – 4:37
6. "New Dawn Fades (Joy Division cover)" – 5:18 (feat. vocals Jesy Fortino)
7. "Stagger" – 13:15

== Credits ==
- The Sight Below & Simon Scott – production, mixing, guitars, laptop, strings, brass, samplers, synthesizers, and vocals
- Michael Cina – Artwork
- Jesy Fortino – Vocals on "New Dawn Fades"
