= Glider (The Sight Below album) =

Studio album by The Sight Below
- Released: November 11, 2008
- Recorded: 2007–2008, Seattle, Washington, United States
- Genre: Ambient techno, shoegazing
- Length: 49:08
- Label: Ghostly International
- Producer: The Sight Below

The Sight Below chronology
No Place for Us (2008)	Glider (2008)	Murmur (2009)

Professional ratings
Review scores
Source	Rating
Allmusic	4/5 stars
The A.V. Club	(B)
DOA	(very positive)
Foxy Digitalis	9/10 stars
Pitchfork Media	(6.8/10)
PopMatters	7/10 stars
RA	3.5/5 stars
Tiny Mix Tapes	3.5/5 stars

Glider is the first full-length album by American ambient techno musician The Sight Below, released on November 11, 2008 by Ghostly International. It was released worldwide in January 2009 with a bonus track, only available at the label's digital store. The album was recorded live in Seattle during the winter of 2007-2008 and focuses on manipulated electric guitar sounds, equally influenced by shoegazing, ambient techno, and 4AD's early catalog.

According to several interviews, The Sight Below didn't use any synthesizers on Glider. The ambient drones and soundscapes on the album were created by performing with a viola bow or light pick and running guitars through a chain of reverb, delays, and looping effects, with a stronger emphasis on textures and subliminal rhythmic patterns.

The album was very well received by the press and music community, including praise from Radiohead's Thom Yorke, who charted "At First Touch" on his January 6, 2009 "Office Chart" posting on the band's website Dead Air Space.

Glider shares its title with a 1990 My Bloody Valentine EP, an influence on The Sight Below's music.

Glider's desolated artwork imagery was created and designed by graphic artist Michael Cina. The inner sleeve contains a quote from Albert Camus. In an interview with Seattle's The Stranger newspaper, The Sight Below stated being influenced by Camus' work as a teenager.

== Track listing ==
1. "At First Touch" – 4:53
2. "Dour" – 4:54
3. "Without Motion" – 4:38
4. "Life's Fading Light" – 5:46
5. "Further Away" – 6:00
6. "The Sunset Passage" – 3:49
7. "Already There" – 5:44
8. "A Fractured Smile" – 5:09
9. "Nowhere" – 8:19
10. "Feeling Lost Forever" (Digital-only bonus track)

== Personnel ==
- The Sight Below – Production, mixing, guitar, laptop
- Michael Cina – Artwork design
- Stefan Betke – Mastering
