= Destination Time: Today =

Destination Time Today

Studio album by Graf Orlock
- Released: 2009
- Genre: Grindcore, Hardcore punk
- Label: Vitriol
- Producer: Ronald Uruk

Graf Orlock chronology
Destination Time Tomorrow (2007)	Destination Time Today (2009)	Doombox (2011)

Destination Time Today is an album by grindcore band Graf Orlock. It was released on May 14, 2009. This is the third chapter of the Destination Time trilogy, named after the controversial UCLA screenplay. As with previous records, each song begins with a sample from a film that relates to the title. This album deals with modern themes including bioterrorism and ongoing overseas conflicts.

== Track listing ==
1. "Chapter III"
2. "Run Over By a Truck"
3. "Franky; Buying Dog Food"
4. "An Interest in Prosthetics"
5. "Not Our Problem"
6. "Days of High Adventure"
7. "Deluxe Mental Hospital Tour"
8. "Jamming in Traffic"
9. "Pre-retirement Nerves; Cop Killers"
10. "Talking Terrorism"
11. "Murder on the MTA"
12. "A Bad Day in Africa"
13. "End Credits: Voice of America's Sons"

== Personnel ==
- "Kalvin Kristoff" – vocals
- "Jason Schmidt" – guitar, vocals
- "Sven Calhoun" – bass
- "Alan Hunter" – drums
