= Emanuele Errante =

Italian composer and sound artist (born 1968)

- Born: 17 February 1968 (age 58); Udine, Italy
- Origin: Baia, Phlegraean Fields, Italy
- Genres: Ambient, electronic
- Occupations: Composer; sound artist
- Years active: 2006–present
- Labels: Karaoke Kalk, Fluid Audio, Hypnos, Somnia, Silentes, Apegenine

Emanuele Errante (born 17 February 1968) is an Italian composer and sound artist working in the fields of ambient and modern classical music.

== Biography ==
Born in Udine, Errante lives and works in Baia, in the Phlegraean Fields near Naples. His music moves between ambient and modern classical, built on a minimalist approach of electroacoustic textures, field recordings and a strong sense of spatial depth.

After an early period devoted to synthesis and sound design with hardware instruments, he took up computer-based composition in the early 2000s, before gradually returning, in later years, to a working method centred on physical instruments.

Errante made his debut in 2006 with the album Migrations (Apegenine). His second album, Humus (2008, Somnia), was widely reviewed by Italian and international critics and appeared on several year-end lists, among them Headphone Commute's twenty-five best albums of 2008 and The Silent Ballet's list, where it was ranked eleventh. In 2011 he released Time Elapsing Handheld on the Berlin label Karaoke Kalk, again reviewed by Italian and international outlets. He went on to release The Evanescence of a Thousand Colors (2018, Karaoke Kalk), This World (2019, Whitelabrecs) and Yon (2020, Fluid Audio). In 2022 he self-released Shapes, an EP collecting four pieces from his live concert at the Sala Pasolini in Salerno on 27 November 2021, organised by the Fondazione Alfonso Gatto and recorded by Luigi Ferrara.

Over the course of his career he has released music on labels including Karaoke Kalk, Somnia, Apegenine, Hypnos, Fluid Audio, Elastica, Whitelabrecs and Silentes, and has worked with artists such as Dakota Suite, Dag Rosenqvist, Luigi Ferrara, Marco Messina, Fabrizio Elvetico, Enrico Coniglio, Fabio Orsi and Giulio Aldinucci.

He has performed live in Italy and abroad, sharing the stage with artists from the ambient and electronic scene, and has appeared at festivals such as Interferenze, Santarcangelo Festival and Flussi.

In 2012 he was the artist behind In Limina Orbis, a sound art residency project promoted by the Interferenze New Arts Festival and curated by Leandro Pisano, devoted to capturing the soundscape of the Phlegraean Fields—from the sounds of volcanic activity to those of archaeological sites such as the Temple of Mercury at Baia—and presented as a live performance at Lake Avernus. The project was revived along similar lines in 2024 for the tenth edition of the Liminaria festival, again curated by Pisano, which also hosted the Slovenian artist Petra Kapš (OR Poiesis). In June 2023 he gave a sound performance as part of Energies under the Volcano, an event within the Italian–Japanese cooperation programme Energies in the Rural—linked to Liminaria and to the Aomori Contemporary Art Centre—held in Ottaviano, within Vesuvius National Park; the event also screened the In Limina Orbis video documentary and presented audiovisual works by the Japanese artist Hideki Umezawa. That same year, together with Gigi Masin, he created the sound design for Letture eleatiche (Eleatic Readings), a performance of philosophical readings interpreted by Roberto del Gaudio with visuals by Andrea Maioli, presented at Velia for the opening of the exhibition Elea: la rinascita (Elea: The Rebirth) and promoted by the Fondazione Alfonso Gatto. In May 2024, as part of the Ri(vis)ti programme in Ottaviano (within the Open Ottaviano initiative), he presented I suoni del rito (The Sounds of the Rite), a work devoted to the feast of the town's patron saint, Saint Michael: the sounds of the celebration, recorded and reworked, were given a live performance in the former church of the Ave Gratia Plena convent.

== Soundtracks ==
Some of Errante's compositions have been used in documentary soundtracks, including Lieux de notre passage by Tomasz Cichawa. He also composed the original score for the short film L'inferno dei viventi (The Inferno of the Living).

== Other activities ==
One of the pioneers of the netaudio scene in Italy, Errante founded the netlabel OpenLab Records and conceived NetstockFest (2005), possibly the first entirely online music festival: over three days, artists and audiences from different parts of the world shared a single virtual venue in an unbroken musical stream. Together with Luigi Ferrara, he also hosted the radio programme Bootleg on Fango Radio, in which a different artist was introduced and interviewed live in each episode.

== Style ==
Critics have described Errante's work as a form of electroacoustic ambient with atmospheric, introspective overtones, marked by the use of field recordings and by a blend of organic detail and electronic experimentation. His work with timbre also seeks out sounds that, though synthetic in origin, can be perceived as natural, in part through the integration of environmental recordings.

== Discography ==
=== Solo albums ===
- 2006 – Migrations (Apegenine)
- 2008 – Humus (Somnia)
- 2011 – Time Elapsing Handheld (Karaoke Kalk)
- 2018 – The Evanescence of a Thousand Colors (Karaoke Kalk)
- 2019 – This World (Whitelabrecs)
- 2020 – Yon (Fluid Audio)
- 2022 – Shapes (self-released)

=== Collaborative albums ===
- 2010 – Out and About – with Enrico Coniglio and Elisa Marzorati, as Herìon (Hypnos)
- 2011 – The North Green Down – with Dakota Suite (Lidar; vinyl reissue on Karaoke Kalk)
- 2015 – ELEM – with Marco Messina and Fabrizio Elvetico, as ELEM (Elastica)
- 2018 – Godere Operaio – with Marco Messina and Fabrizio Elvetico, as ELEM (Mahana Bay Label)
- 2018 – What Matters Most – with Dakota Suite and Dag Rosenqvist (Karaoke Kalk)
- 2024 – Domus – with Giulio Aldinucci, Luigi Ferrara, Maurizio Martinucci (TeZ) and Fabio Orsi, as Modus (Silentes)
