= Graf Orlock (band) =

American hardcore punk band

- Also known as: Gorlock
- Origin: Los Angeles, California, United States
- Died: Anaheim, California
- Genres: Grindcore, metalcore, hardcore punk
- Years active: 2003–2023
- Labels: Level Plane, Vitriol
- Members: "Svarn Kalhoune"; "Alan Hunter"; "Jason Schmidt"; "Karl Bournze"
- Past members: "Sven Calhoun"; "Kalvin Kristoff"; "Jeff Hermann"; "Ivan Somple"; ”Michael Morningstar”
- Website: graforlock.com

Graf Orlock was an American hardcore punk band formed in 2003 in Los Angeles, California, United States. They were named after Count Orlok from the 1922 film Nosferatu. The band consists of members of the hardcore punk bands Greyskull, Arctic Choke, Dangers and Ghostlimb, and employs audio snippets and script dialogue from action films such as The Terminator, Aliens and RoboCop in all their songs, which has led to the band being jokingly described as "cinema-grind". The band formed after guitarist Jason Schmidt and drummer Alan Hunter along with bassist Sven Calhoun and vocalist Kalvin Kristoff begun releasing EPs and split albums. In 2006, they started the Destination Time trilogy based on a screenplay that Schmidt and Hunter had been working on in university; the second instalment was the 2007 EP Destination Time Tomorrow which was listed at number 16 in Decibel Magazine's top 40 releases of 2007. Their latest album Crimetraveler was released in 2016 through Vitriol Records, a label run by members of the band and also featuring Ghostlimb, Robotosaurus, Owen Hart, Teeth, Dangers, Birds in Row and Totalt Jävla Mörker.

In October 2018, the band's label, Vitriol Records, announced a forthcoming album, Examination of Violent Cinema Vol. 1, which was released in December of that year. The album contains 12 songs based on the theme of criticism of recent motion picture releases.

== Members ==
All members use multiple pseudonyms, but these names are most commonly used:

=== Current ===
- "Bruce Da Deuce" – Bass (2011–present)
- "Alan Hunter" – Drums (2003–present)
- "Jason Schmidt" – Guitar, vocals, (2003–present)
- "Karl Bournze" – Vocals (2008–present)

=== Former ===
- "Sven Calhoun" – bass (2003–2011)
- "Kalvin Kristoff" – vocals (2003–2008)
- "Jeff Hermann"
- "Ivan Somple"
- ”Michael Morningstar”

== Discography ==
Studio albums

- Destination Time Yesterday (2006)
- Destination Time Today (2009)
- Crimetraveler (2016)
- Examination Of Violent Cinema, Volume 1 (December 2018)

EPs

- Graf Orlock (2004)
- Corpserate Greed (2004)
- Destination Time Tomorrow (2007)
- Doombox (2011)
- Los Angeles (2012)
- End Credits (2023)

Splits

- With Hurry Up and Kill Yourself (2004)
- With Greyskull (2005)

== See also ==
- ArnoCorps
- Austrian Death Machine
