= No Place for Us =

No Place For Us
- Cover for EP and title track

EP by The Sight Below
- Released: August 4, 2008
- Recorded: 2007–2008
- Genre: Ambient techno, shoegazing
- Length: 17:12
- Label: Ghostly International
- Producer: The Sight Below

The Sight Below chronology
No Place For Us (2008)	Glider (2008)

Professional ratings
Review scores
Source	Rating
XLR8R	not rated, September 22, 2008 link
URB	not rated, September 2, 2008 link
Textura	not rated, September issue, 2008 link

No Place For Us is the debut EP by ambient techno act The Sight Below, released on August 26, 2008 by Ghostly International. It is available as a free, promotional download on the label's website. The EP was recorded live in Seattle, Washington during the winter of 2007–2008. It is equally influenced by shoegaze and ambient techno.

Each track also has its own individual artwork. In addition, at the bottom of the "back cover" artwork that contains the credits, the artist simply states to the reader,"Share this music."

The opening track, No Place For Us, is reminiscent of William Basinski's The Disintegration Loops, Biosphere and Wolfgang Voigt's Gas project.

== Track listing ==
All songs written by The Sight Below

1. "No Place For Us" - 6:16
2. "With Her Kiss (I'd Pass The Sky)" - 6:25
3. "Twice Failed" - 4:31

== Personnel ==
- The Sight Below — Production, Mixing, Guitars, Laptop
- Michael Cina — Artwork design
- Stefan Betke — Mastering at Scape Mastering (Berlin, Germany)
