= David Kristian =

Canadian musician, composer and sound designer

- Born: November 5, 1967 (age 58); Canada
- Occupation: Film composer

David Kristian (born November 5, 1967) is a Canadian musician, film score composer, and sound designer.

David Kristian has been involved in audio for media since the early 1980s, when he first started work as an animation and experimental filmmaker at a New Brunswick television station. Upon relocating to Montreal, Kristian decided to abandon film-making in order to focus on a music career, first as a solo artist, then as the keyboardist and synthesist for the group Psyche, with whom he recorded "The Influence" in Germany.

David Kristian left Psyche in late 1989 and he returned to Montreal to concentrate on more Ambient and instrumental music, citing Tangerine Dream, Robert Fripp and the film scores of Director John Carpenter as longtime influences. Based on his past experience as a filmmaker, it was clear that David Kristian's path would lead to more soundtrack work.

During the 1990s and 2000s, he released several albums on labels as diverse as Crème Organization, Minimal Rome, Ninja Tune, Lo Recordings, Schematic Records, Alien8 Recordings, and Apegenine recordings. Kristian has produced music under aliases, including Gentle Bakemono, Francesco Clemente, and DKMD, a disco duo he is a part of with singer-musician Marie Davidson. David Kristian has also directed two music videos for DKMD, including "Sacrificio"; a horror-disco homage to Giallo films.

Kristian has also performed at several events, including Mutek, Le Festival International de Musique Actuelle de Victoriaville, SONAR, FCMM, The Fantasia Festival, SHARE, and ISEA.

David Kristian's return to sound design and film scoring was on Karim Hussain's Subconscious Cruelty, for which he contributed eerie ambient music, surreal room tones, and special sound design.

Kristian's music and sound design work can be heard on a variety of projects, including Anime and web commercials by Macromedia Flash animation innovator Ryosuke Aoike. He has composed the scores for the short films of Mitch Davis, Matthew Garrett's Beating Hearts, Karim Hussain's Vision Stains, which is part of the horror anthology film The Theatre Bizarre, and several feature films, such as Karim Hussain's Ascension, La Belle Bête, Francois Miron's The 4th Life, and Matthew Garrett's Morris County.

Other recent film score work includes most of the underscoring and end titles music for Nacho Cerdà's The Abandoned, and Douglas Buck's remake of Brian De Palma's Sisters. For the latter film, he collaborated with Emmy Award-winning composer Edward Dzubak (As the World Turns); the two had also previously collaborated on Buck's film, Prologue.

In 2015, David Kristian was working as a video game sound designer and composer, with credits on such titles as Army of Two: The 40th Day, TERA, Tom Clancy's Splinter Cell: Conviction, and open world action-adventure video games Watch Dogs, for which he also created additional music, and most recently, Watch Dogs 2. He is now working exclusively for Ubisoft as an audio artist. In 2014, he co-founded, along with Marie Davidson of Essaie pas, the Electronica band DKMD. Their music was subsequently released by Giallo Disco Records, who will also be releasing David Kristian's next solo project, which has been described as a classic Berlin School synthesizer album realized entirely on a Eurorack modular synthesis system.
