= Los Angeles (Graf Orlock EP) =

EP by Graf Orlock
- Released: April 10, 2012
- Genres: Grindcore, Hardcore punk
- Length: 10:12
- Label: Vitriol

Graf Orlock chronology
Doombox (2011)	Los Angeles (2012)	Crimetraveler (2016)

Los Angeles is an EP by Graf Orlock. It is inspired and based on the action/crime film, Heat. It was released by Vitriol Records on April 10, 2012. The first 7" pressing was limited to 200 copies, while the second pressing is limited to 600.

== Reception ==
Natalie Zina Walschots of Exclaim! described Los Angeles as "tight" and "explosive", "designed to titillate and entertain".

== Track listing ==
1. "Dead Man Talking" – 2:11
2. "No Attachments" – 1:44
3. "Couples Seeking Comfort/No Point" – 2:13
4. "Quick on the Trigger" – 4:04

== Personnel ==
- "Karl Bournze" – vocals
- "Jason Schmidt" – guitar, vocals
- "Svarn Kalhoune" – bass
- "Alan Hunter" – drums
