= Further Future =

Cultural Festival in Nevada

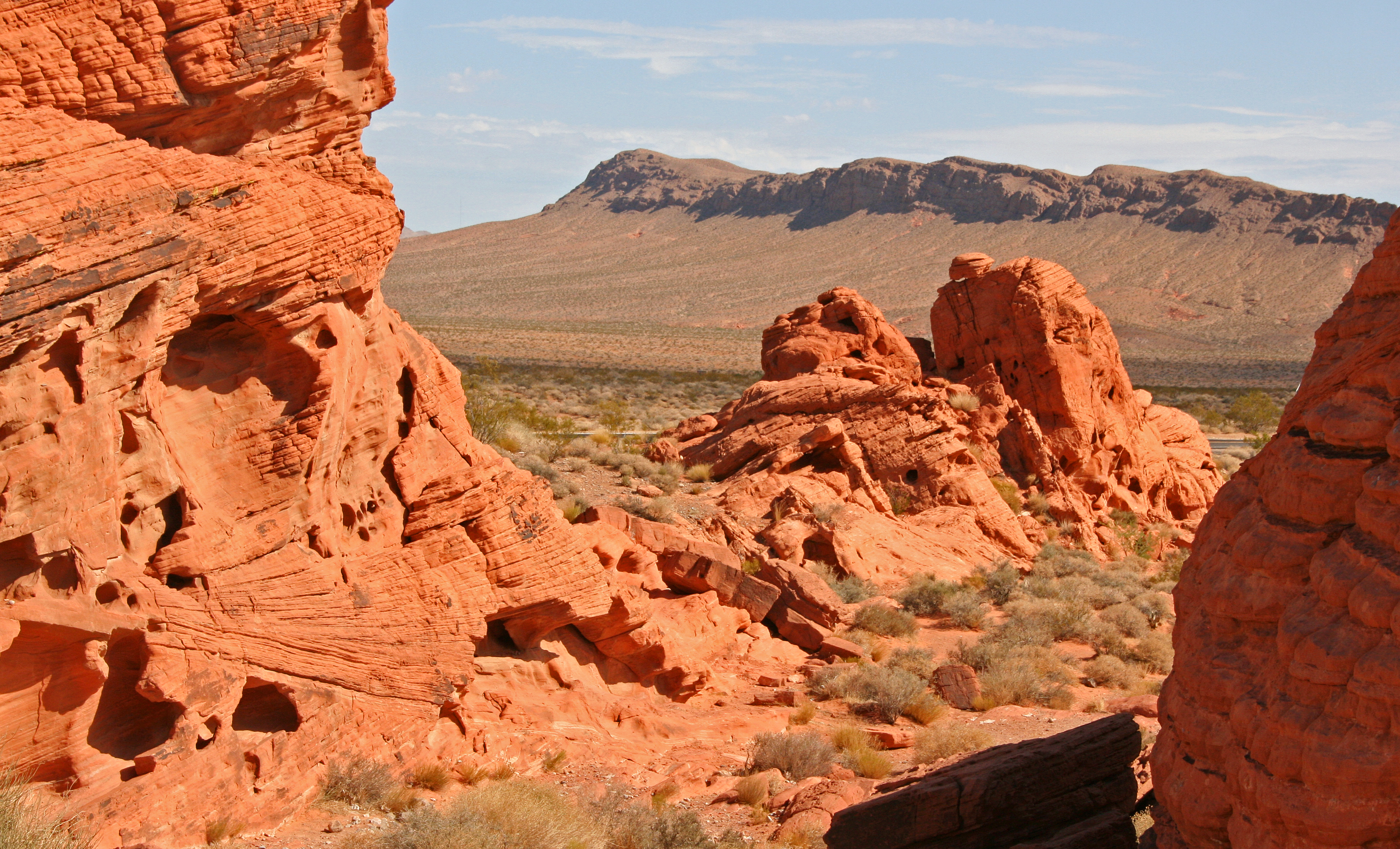
The alternate and final site of Further Future sits on land owned by the Moapa band of Paiute Indians. near the Valley of Fire State Park.

Further Future was a festival held in southern Nevada. The Further Future model was, “a shared experience that’s beyond our future,” and, "promises a carefully curated slate of, business and cultural leaders, chefs, mixologists and masseuses". Further Future catered to a techie club of invitation only exclusives in a controlled setting. Further Future's membership was 4000-5000 people and was structured around a corporate retreat setting. Further Future, located on the Moapa River Indian Reservation, claimed to offers an "all inclusive" festival experience, different than the, "vanish and leave no trace" principles instilled in those who participate in Burning Man. Further Future was the brainchild of a group called Robot Heart, an art and music collective known for the parties it throws during the annual Burning Man gathering in Northern Nevada's Black Rock Desert. The Further Future event aspired “to be a gathering of people with the common goal to spend time together celebrating the infinite possibilities of the future, without necessarily being shackled to the dictates of the past or the cycles of present-day society." The invitation-only festival for as many as 5,000 people ran from April 29 to May 1 in 2016 and 2017.

== Use permit issues ==
Prior to the launch of Further Future, the Bureau of Land Management BLM (a federal agency) denied organizers a commercial use permit for the roads leading towards the intended location on an abandoned mine in Lake Mead, NV. The Anniversary Mine, is a 215-acre tract between Lake Mead National Recreation Area and the Bureau of Land Management's Muddy Mountains Wilderness Area. The BLM and the National Park Service denied the Further Future festival a commercial use permit for access to the roads which lead across public land to the privately owned mine. The alternate and final site sits on land owned by the Moapa band of Paiute Indians. The event now held on land controlled by the Moapa Band of Paiutes is off the I-15 exit, toward the Valley of Fire State Park. The Moapa band of Paiute Indians tribe has about 350 people, roughly 200 of whom live on the 75,000-acre Moapa River Indian Reservation.
