= Khonnor =

American electronic musician

- Also known as: Grandma; I, Cactus; I, Cocktus; Clown Connecktion; Gaza Faggot; Anus Morissette; Jimmy Buffer; Stretch MCs; CCLCNG
- Born: Connor Christian Kirby-Long; July 24, 1986 (age 40); Vermont, U.S.
- Origin: Saint Johnsbury, Vermont, U.S.
- Years active: 2002–present

Connor Kirby-Long (born July 24, 1986) is an American electronic musician from Saint Johnsbury, Vermont who releases music under the name Khonnor. He has published works under several other names, including Grandma, and I, Cactus.

He used low-tech instruments such as a cheap microphone and an old computer, an amp, a guitar, and experimental electronics in his recording Handwriting. In the beginning of 2020, Weirdsound.net published an article stating that Connor Kirby-Long would return with a new album under the moniker "CCLCNG". The album, called Niagara Falls, is available for download on Bandcamp.

== Discography ==
=== Albums ===
- Handwriting (2004)

As CCLCNG

- Niagara Falls (2020)

=== EPs ===
As I, Cactus

- I, Cactus (2003)

As Grandma

- Spinach Gas Room Spaghetti Straps (2002)
- Bopping Around In A Skin Car (2002)
- For Your Broken Heart (2003)
- Tiny Fashion (2005)

As Clown Connecktion

- I Scribble Out Music With My Left Hand EP (2003)

As Khonnor

- Lost Pets (2003)
- Live from Saint Johnsbury, Vermont (2004)
- Softbo EP (2008)

As Connor Long

- Live At The O Patro Vys (2008)

As Gaza Faggot

- Welcome To Softbo (2006)

As Jimmy Buffer

- Songs That Suck (2009)

=== Singles ===
As I, Cactus

- I Gave You Fleas (2010)
- China Shipping Co. (2010)

As Khonnor

- Burning Palace (2006)
- U (Remix) (2010)

=== Contributions ===
As Khonnor & This Instrument

- Mrs. Anatomy on Soulseek Compilation 001 (2003)

As Grandma

- Holy Moon on L'Arbre D'Un Train (2005)

As Stretch MC's

- Lil Jon Vs. Stretch MC's on Can Buy Me Love 2 (2006)

As Khonnor

- Blindness Bats on Retork (2003)
- Featured on Itadaki Street on Now You're Playing With Powar V: The Arc Of Powar (2005)
- Rectum Sanctum on Can Buy Me Love IV (2007)
- Walking on Moonlight ringtone for Mobile Vomit (2008)
- Hard Boiled Egg Day for Apegenine Vol. 2 - Hypocondriac (2009)
